= East Hampton, New York =

- Town
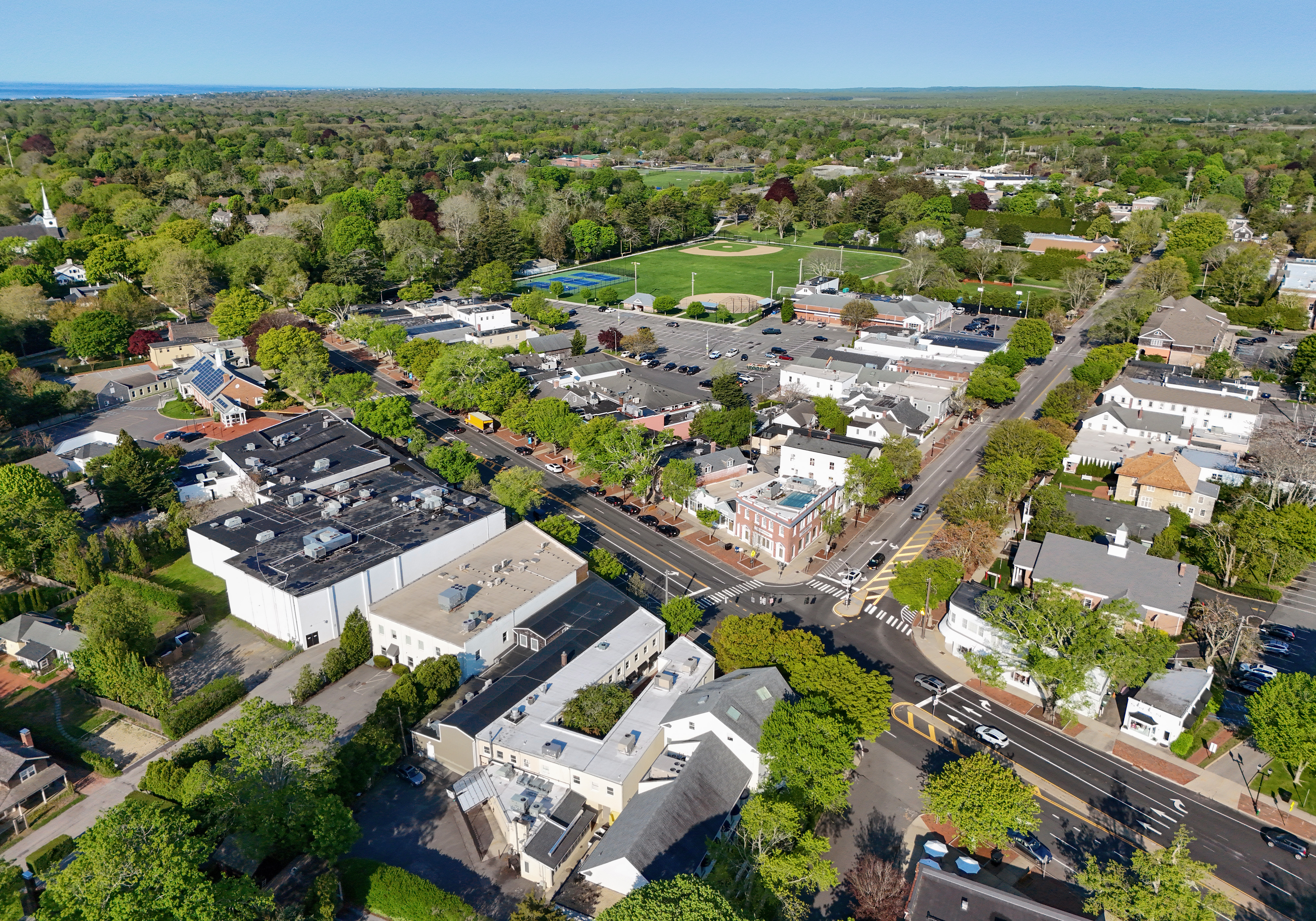
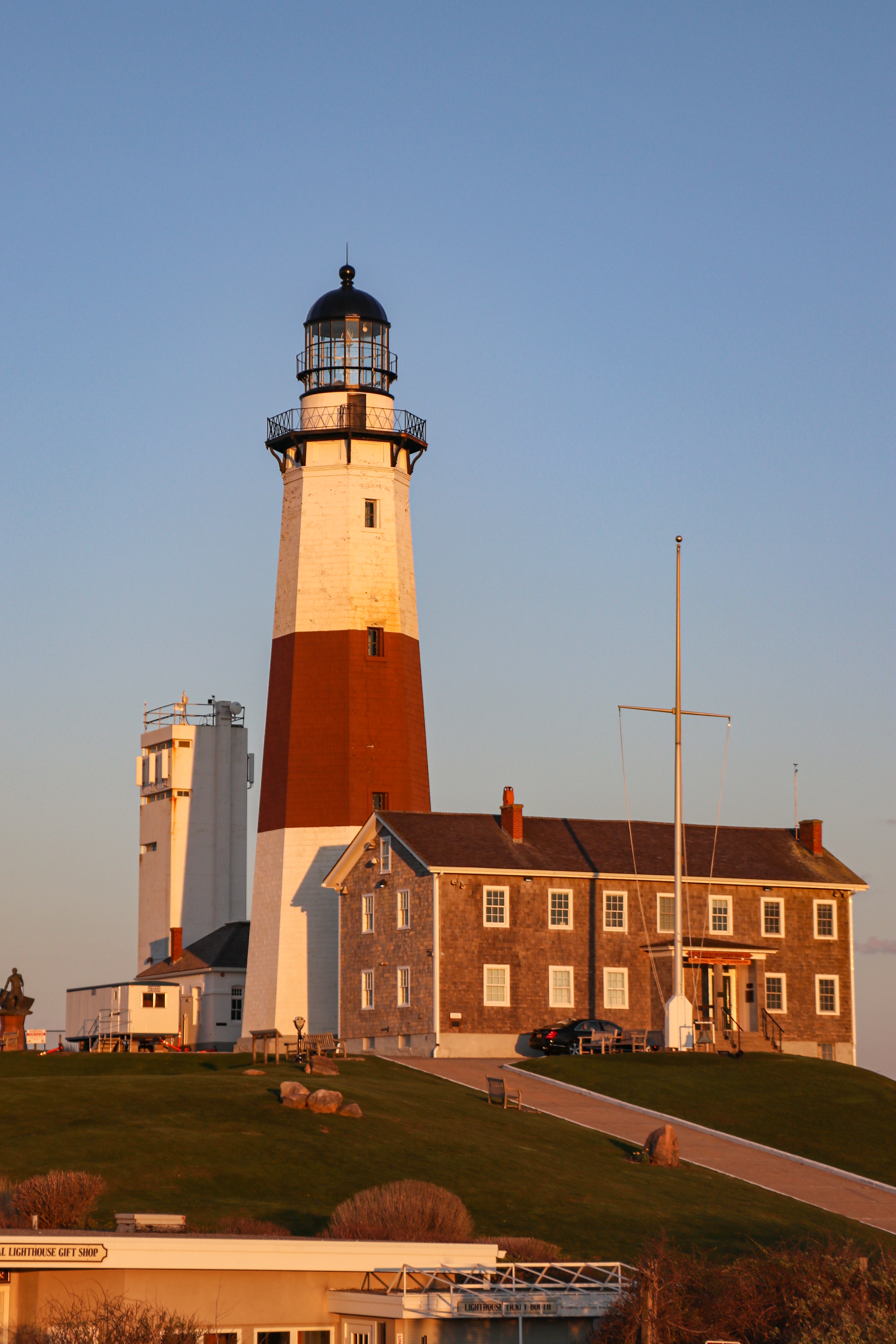
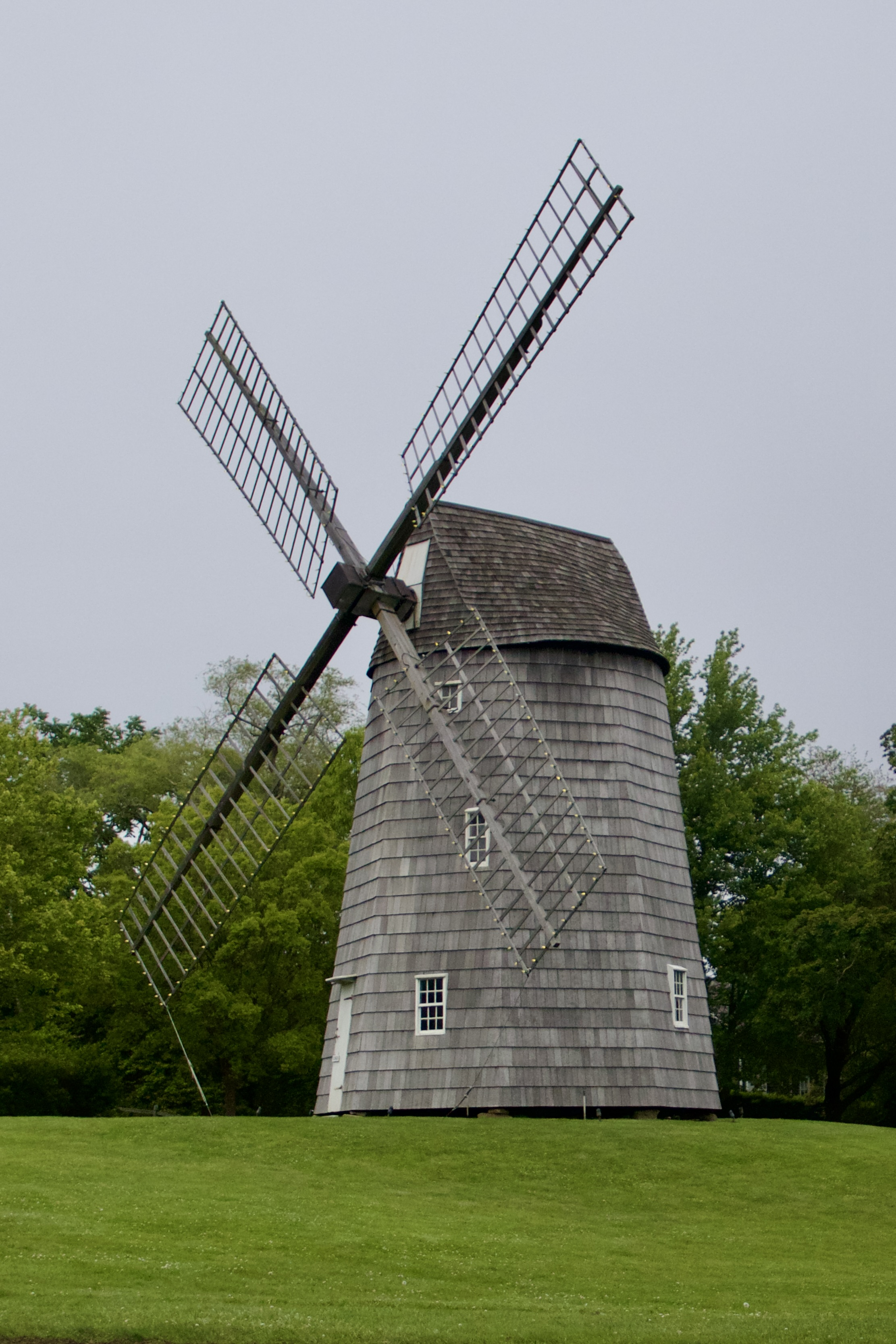
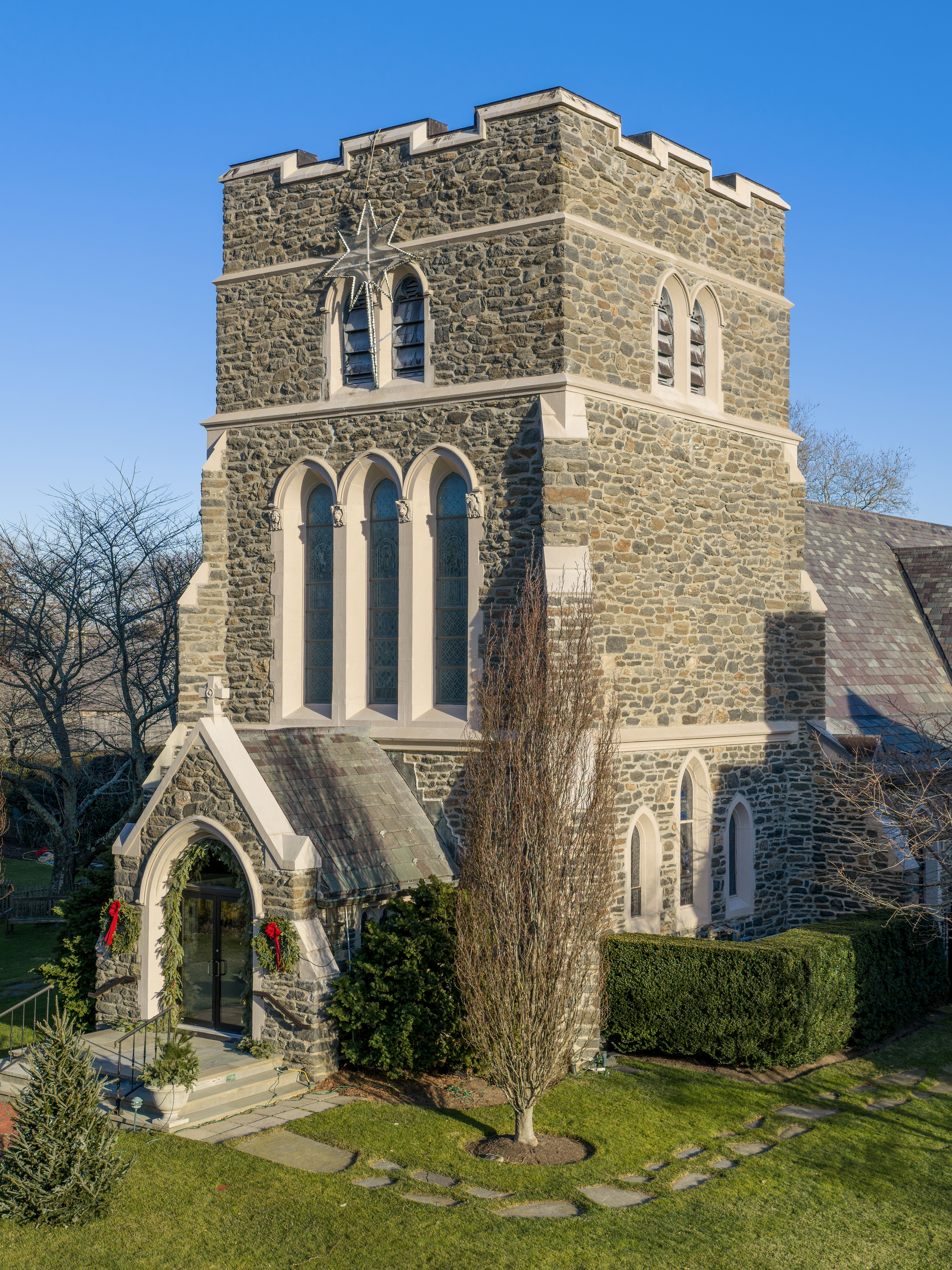
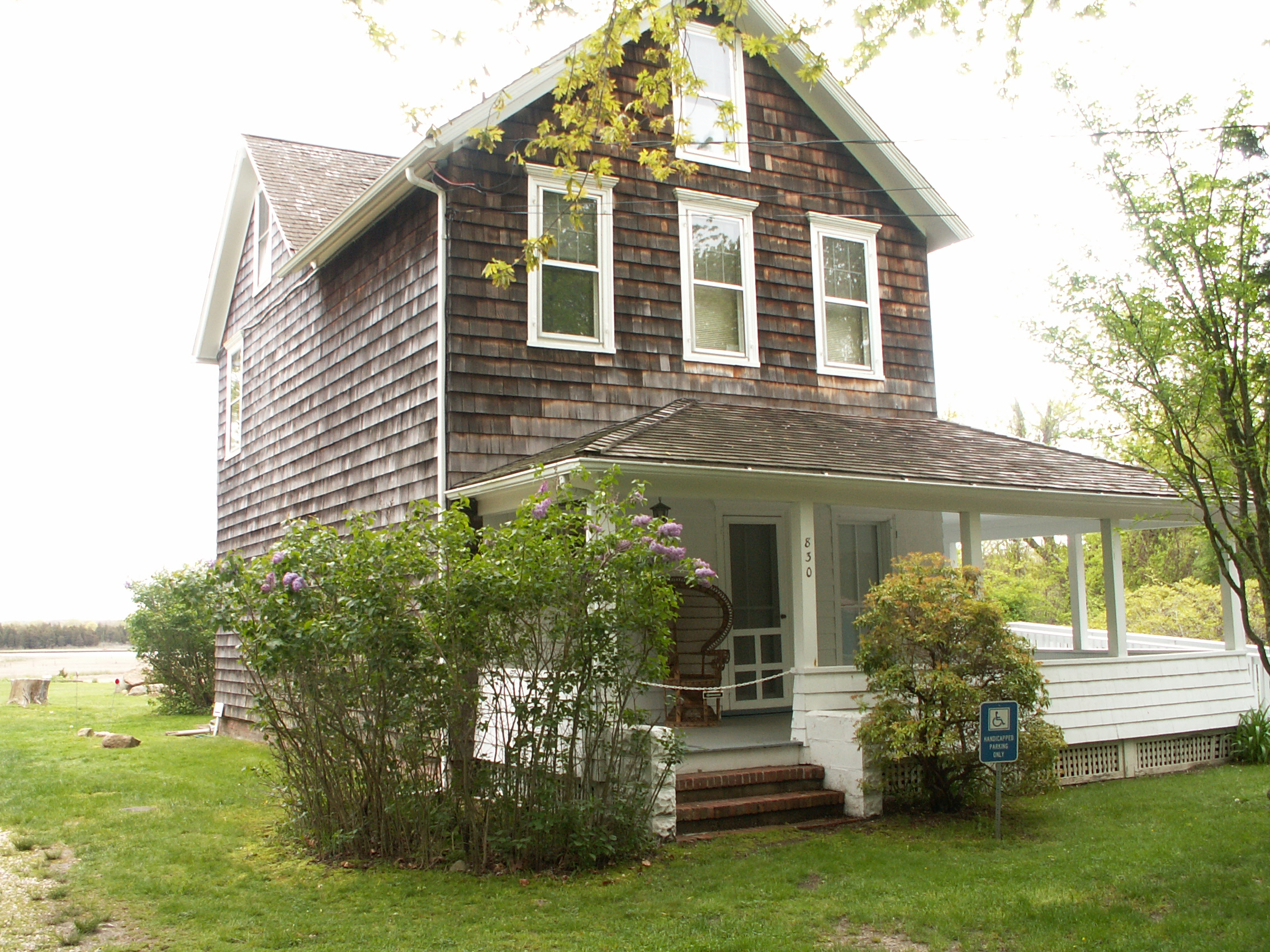
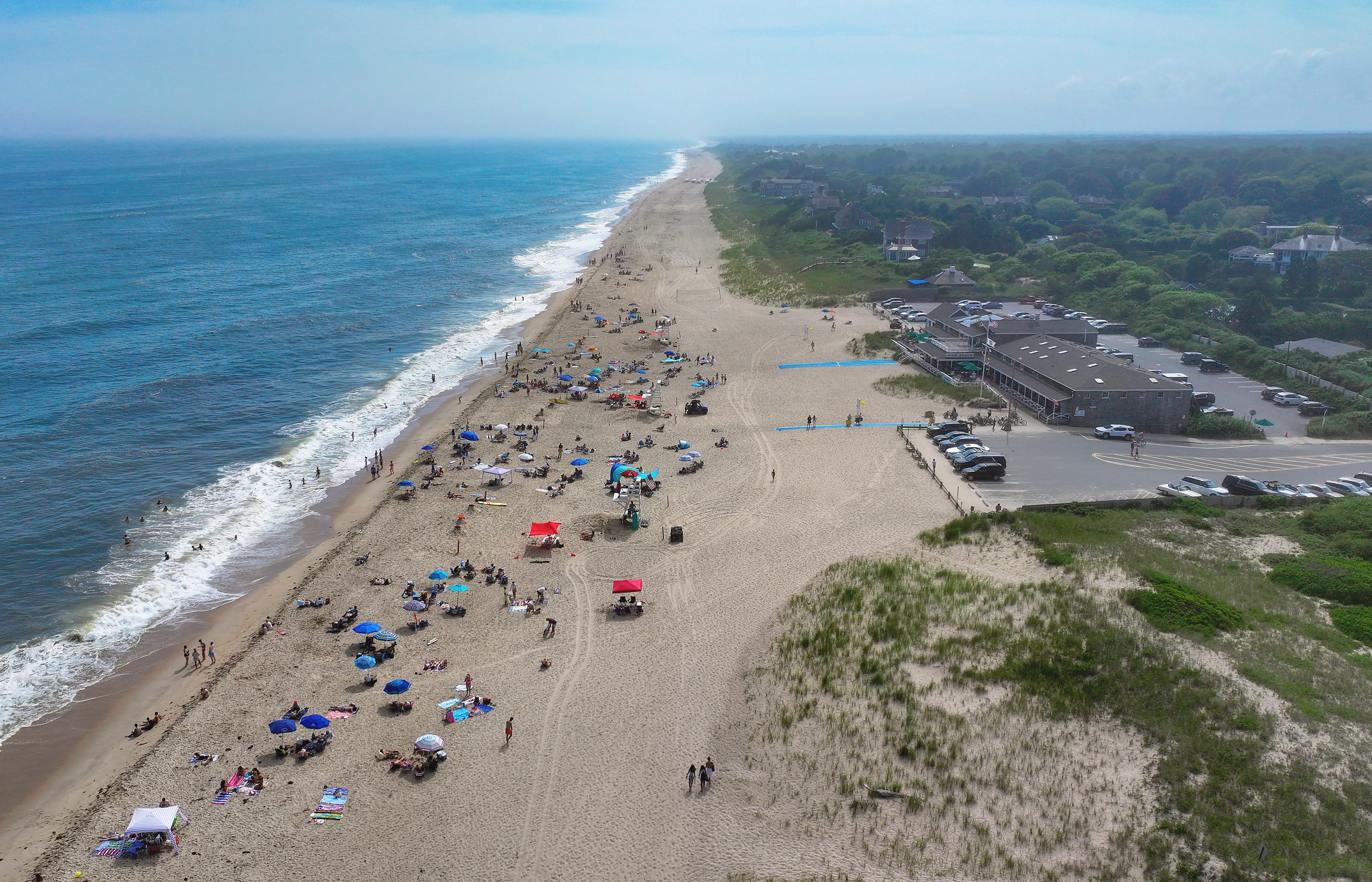
- Village of East Hampton Montauk Lighthouse Hook Windmill St. Luke’s Episcopal Church Pollock-Krasner House Main Beach

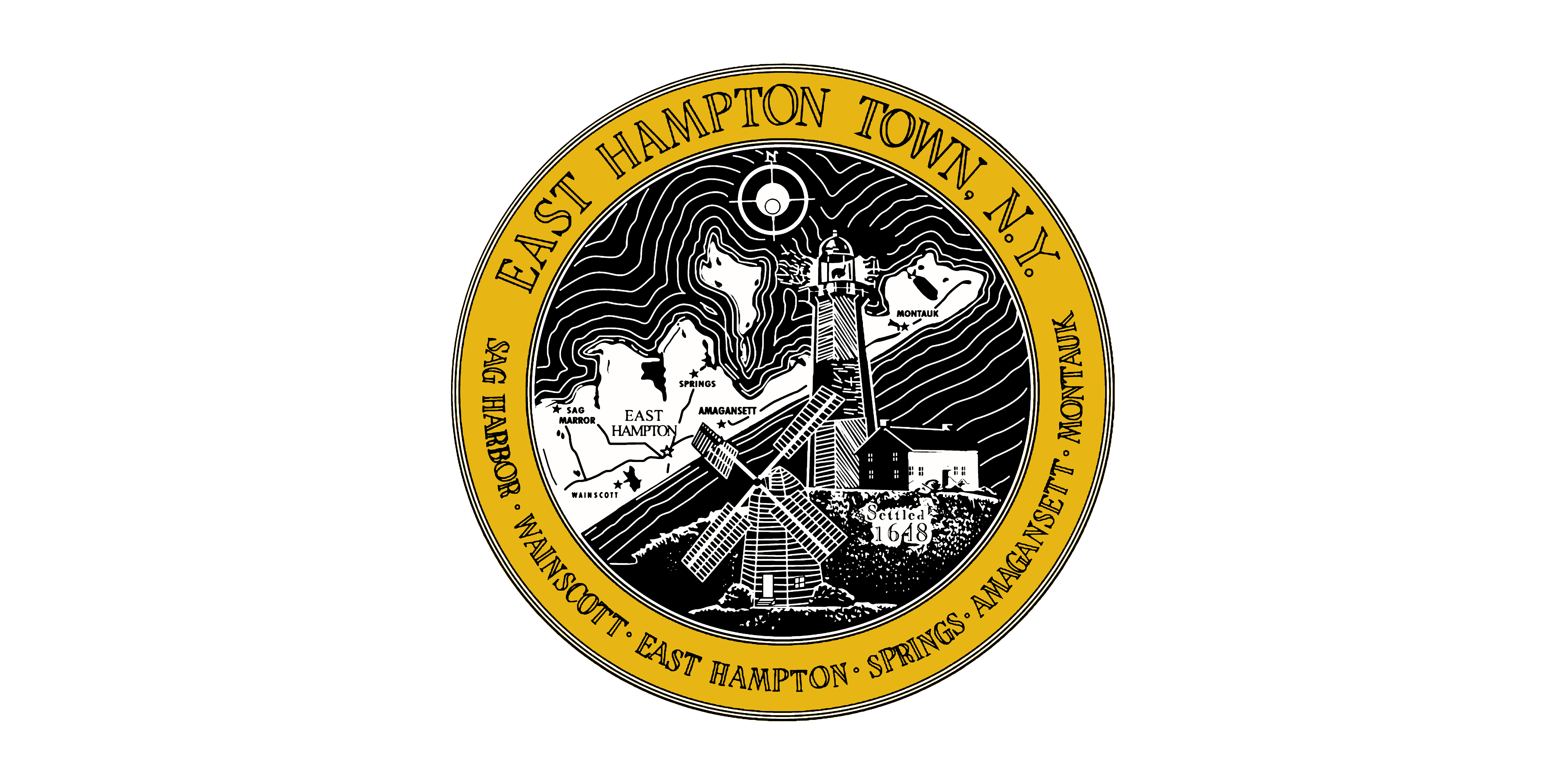
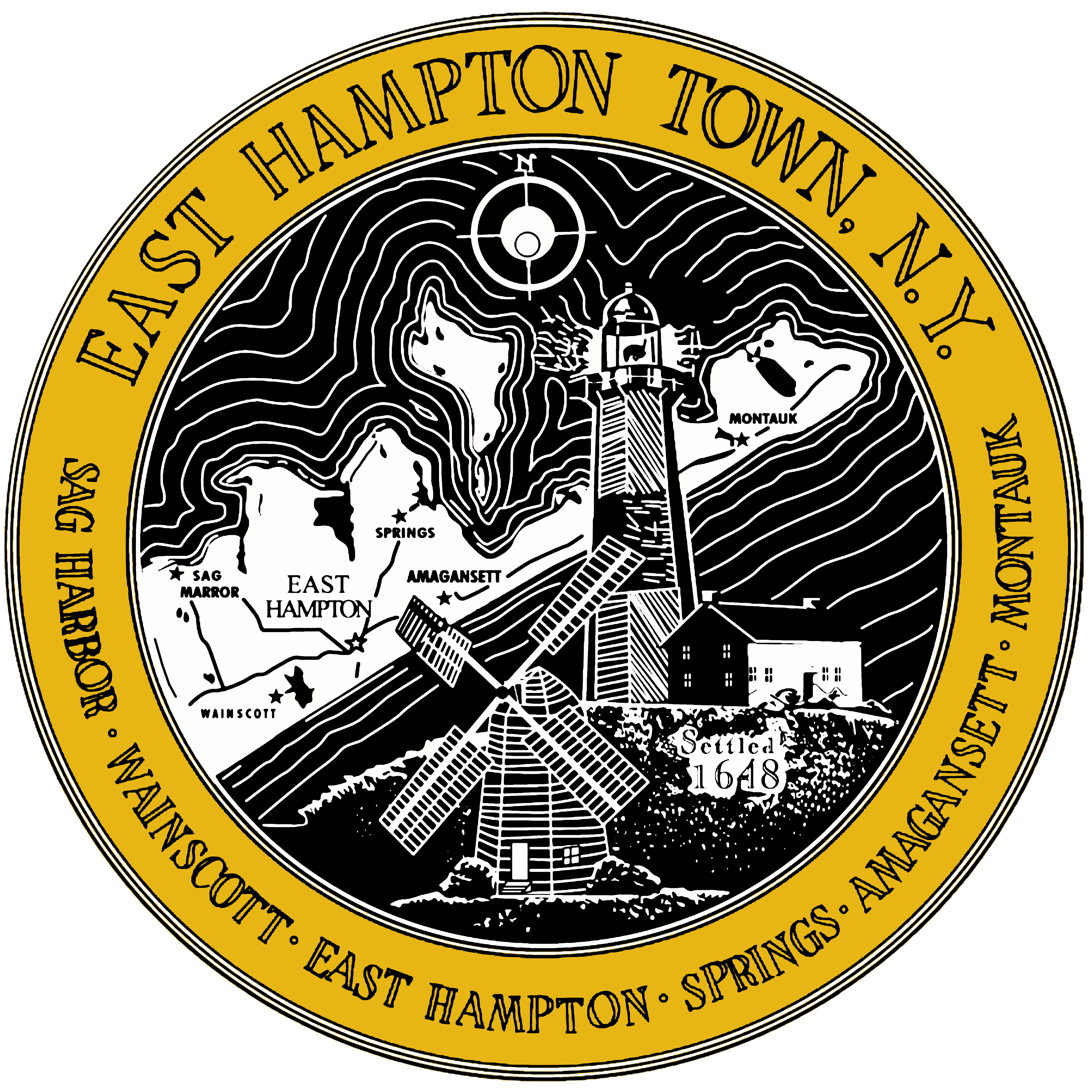
- Flag Seal
- Interactive map of East Hampton, New York
- Location within New York Location within the United States
- Coordinates: 40°57′25″N 72°11′56″W
- Country: United States
- State: New York
- County: Suffolk

Government
  - Type: Town council
  - Supervisor: Kathee Burke-Gonzalez (D)

Area
  - Total: 386.57 sq mi (1,001.21 km^{2})
  - Land: 74.33 sq mi (192.52 km^{2})
  - Water: 312.24 sq mi (808.70 km^{2})
- Elevation: 33 ft (10 m)

Population (2020)
  - Total: 28,385
  - Density: 381.9/sq mi (147.44/km^{2})
- Time zone: UTC−05:00 (Eastern (EST))
  - Summer (DST): UTC−04:00 (EDT)
- ZIP Code: 11937
- Area code: 631
- FIPS code: 36-22194
- GNIS feature ID: 978919
- Website: ehamptonny.gov

East Hampton is a town in southeastern Suffolk County, New York, United States. It is located at the eastern end of the South Shore of Long Island. It is the easternmost town in the state of New York. At the time of the 2020 United States census, it had a total population of 28,385.

The town includes the village of East Hampton, as well as the hamlets of Montauk, Amagansett, Wainscott, Springs, Northwest Harbor, and Napeague. It also includes part of the incorporated village of Sag Harbor.

East Hampton is located on a peninsula, bordered on the south by the Atlantic Ocean, to the east by Block Island Sound and to the north by Gardiners Bay, Napeague Bay and Fort Pond Bay. To the west is western Long Island, reaching to the East River and New York City. The Town has eight state parks, most located at the water's edge.

The town consists of 70 square miles (180 km^{2}) and stretches nearly 25 miles (40 km), from Wainscott in the west to Montauk Point in the east. It is approximately six miles (10 km) wide at its widest point and less than one mile at its narrowest. The town has jurisdiction over Gardiners Island, which is one of the largest privately owned islands in the United States. The town has 70 miles (110 km) of shoreline.

== History ==
=== Native American history ===
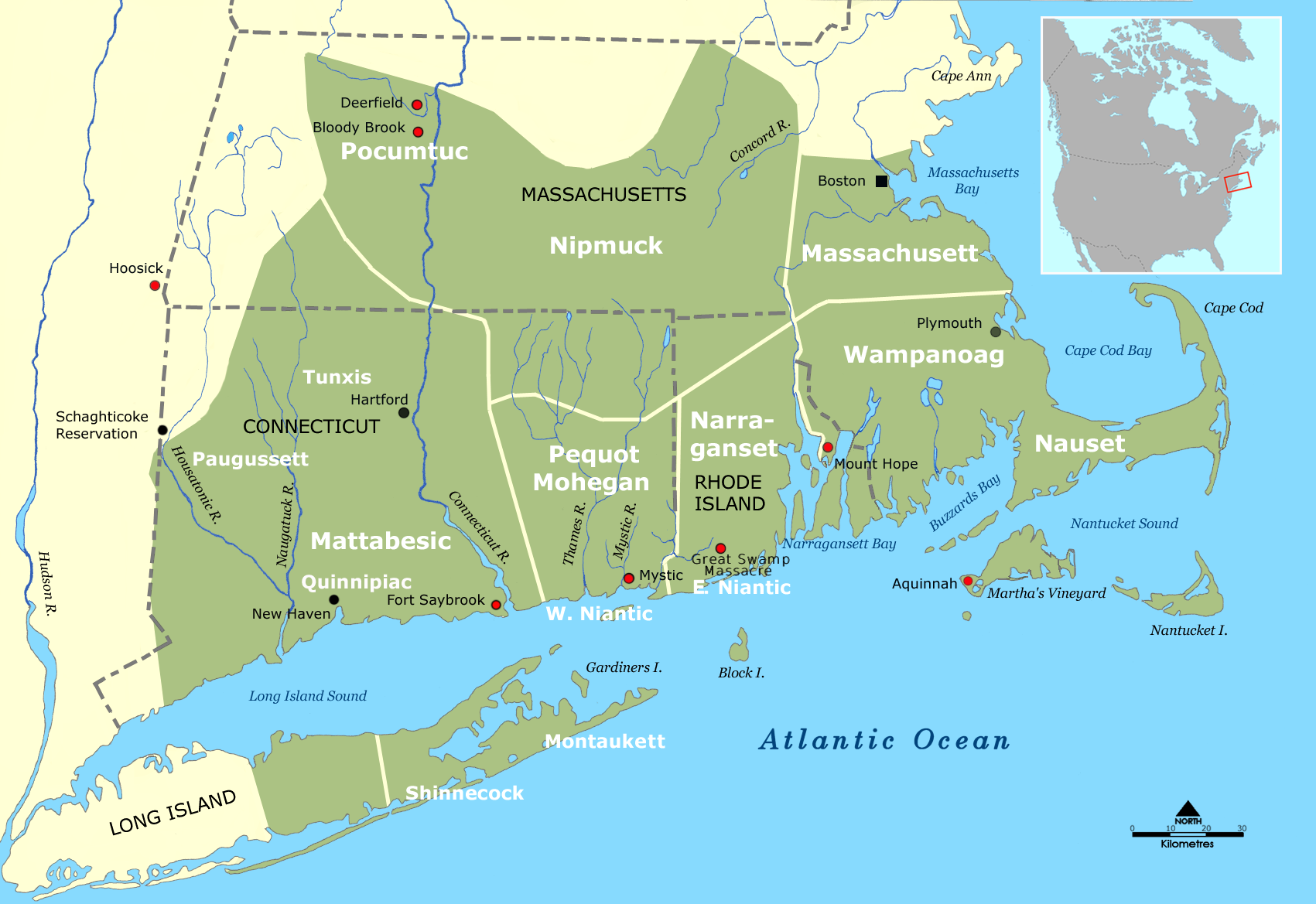
Long Island Native American settlements, and their neighbors

This area had been inhabited for thousands of years by wandering tribes of indigenous peoples. At the time of European contact, East Hampton was home to the Pequot people, part of the culture that also occupied territory on the northern side of Long Island Sound, in what is now Connecticut of southern New England. They belong to the large Algonquian-speaking language family. Bands on Long Island were identified by their geographic locations. The historical people known to the colonists as the Montaukett, who were Pequot, controlled most of the territory at the east end of Long Island.

Indians inhabiting the western part of Long Island were part of the Lenape nation, whose language is also in the Algonquian family. Their territory extended to lower New York, western Connecticut and the mid-Atlantic coastal areas into New Jersey and Pennsylvania. Their bands were also known by the names of their geographic locations but did not constitute distinct peoples.

In the late-17th century, Chief Wyandanch of the Montaukett negotiated with English colonists for the land in the East Hampton area, with governors Theophilus Eaton and Edward Hopkins making the acquisition. The differing concepts held by the Montaukett and English about land and its use contributed to the Montaukett losing most of their lands over the ensuing centuries. Wyandanch's elder brother, the grand sachem Poggaticut, sold an island to English colonist Lion Gardiner for "a large black dog, some powder and shot, and a few Dutch blankets." The next trade involved the land extending from present-day Southampton to the foot of the bluffs, at what is now Hither Hills State Park, for 24 hatchets, 24 coats, 20 looking glasses and 100 muxes.

In 1660, Chief Wyandanch's widow signed away the rest of the land from present-day Hither Hills to the tip of Montauk Point for 100 pounds, to be paid in 10 equal installments of "Indian corn or good wampum at six to a penny". The sales provided that the Montaukett were permitted to stay on the land, to hunt and fish at will, and to harvest the tails and fins of whales that beached on the East Hampton shores. Town officials who bought the land filed for reimbursement from the colony for the rum with which they had plied the tribe during negotiations. Gradually, however, colonists stopped the Montaukett using the land by preventing them from hunting and fishing. They were said to interfere with the crops on their farms, in a conflict similar to the later farmer-rancher arguments of the Old West.

Many of the Montaukett died during the 17th and 18th centuries from epidemics of smallpox, a Eurasian disease carried by some English and Dutch colonists and endemic in their communities, to which the Indians had no immunity. After the American Revolution, some Montaukett relocated with Shinnecock to Oneida County in western upstate New York, led by the Mohegan missionary Samson Occom, to try to escape the settlers' civilization. They formed the Brothertown Indians with other Indians from New England, and gave up some of their traditions. In 1831-1836, the Brothertown Indians migrated to Wisconsin, where they founded the settlement of Brothertown.

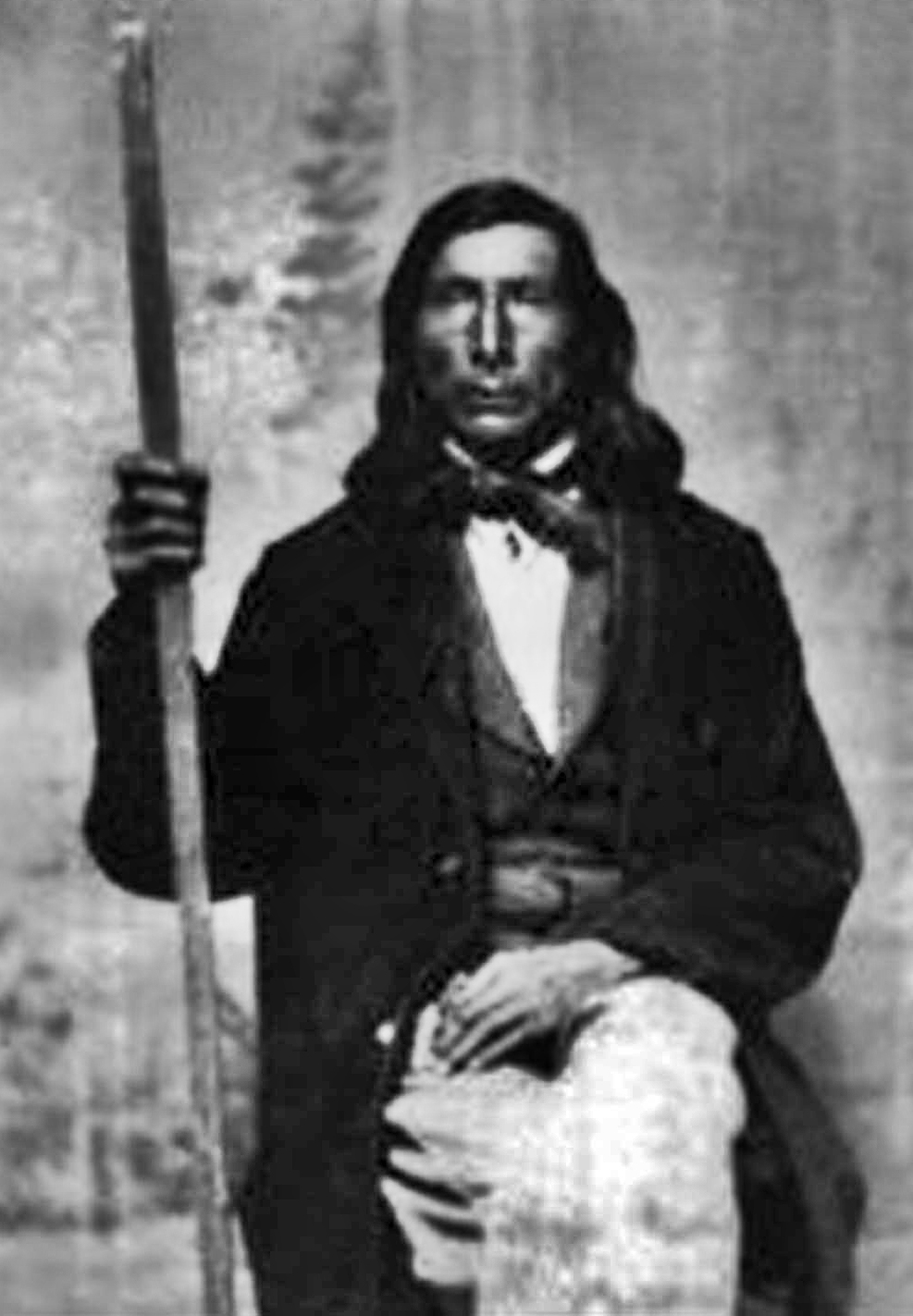
Stephen Talkhouse, Montaukett, c. 1860s

Some Montaukett continued to live on Long Island. In the mid to late nineteenth century, their most well-known member was Stephen Talkhouse. Their area on Lake Montauk was called Indian Fields until 1879. With their population reduced, over the years the Montaukett intermarried with other peoples of the area, but brought up many of their descendants as Montaukett in their culture. When Arthur W. Benson brought a government auction of Montauk, New York, in which he bought nearly the entire east end of the town, he evicted the Montaukett. They relocated to Freetown, a community established by free people of color on the northern edge of East Hampton Village. The tribe made several attempts to get the courts to declare the evictions illegal, but the court ruled in favor of the evictions. Since the 1990s, the Montaukett have pressed for formal recognition as a tribe. The Shinnecock Indian Nation, many of whom had continued to occupy a portion of land on the South Shore and claimed it as their reservation, received federal recognition in 2010 as a tribe and also have state recognition. Historically both groups were part of the larger Pequot people.

Montaukett artifacts and sweat lodges are visible from trails at Theodore Roosevelt County Park. The park was formerly called Montauk County Park.

=== Anglo-European settlement ===
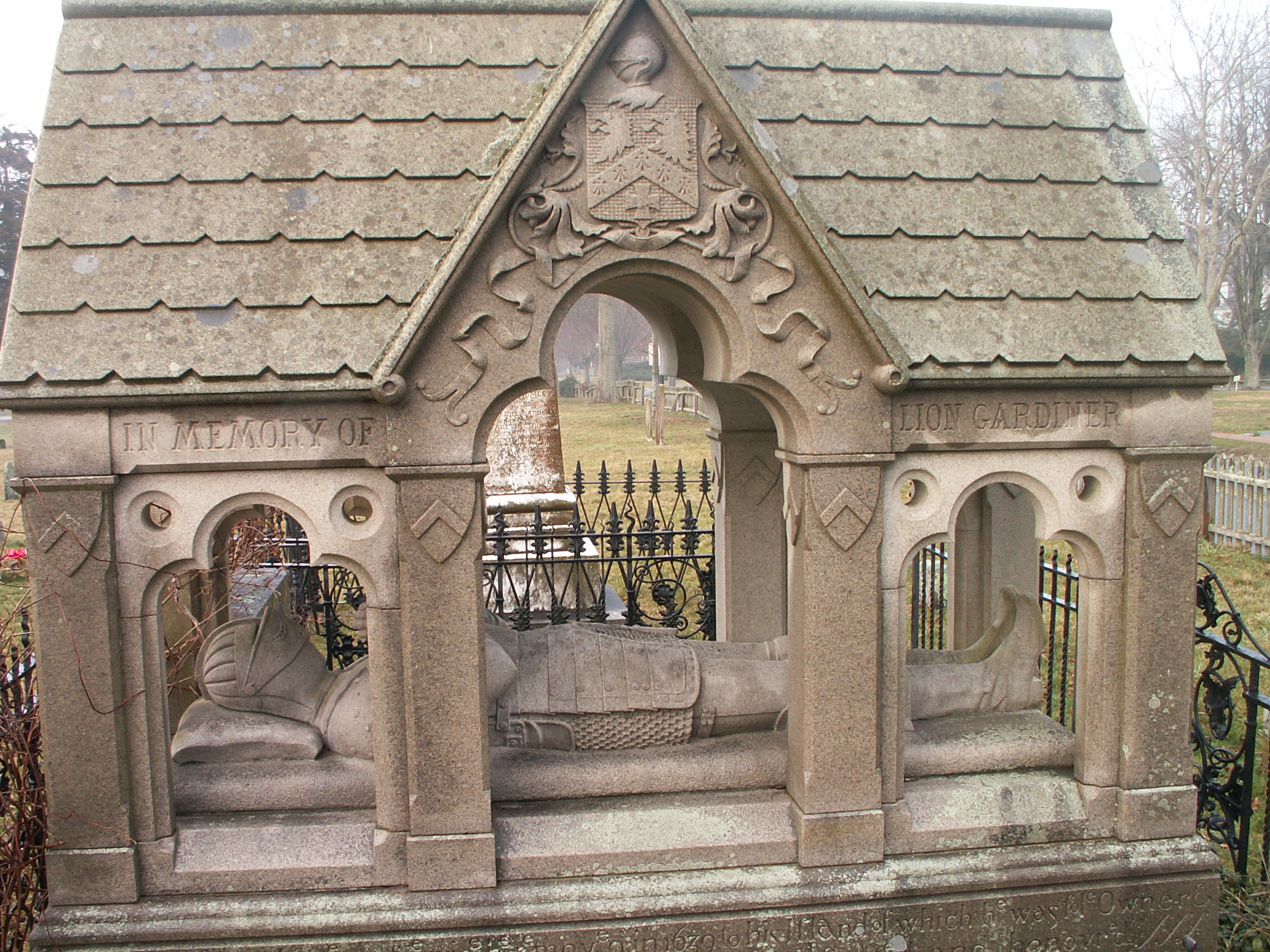
Lion Gardiner tomb at the South End Cemetery

East Hampton was the first English settlement in the state of New York. In 1639 Lion Gardiner purchased land, what became known as Gardiner's Island, from the Montaukett people. In 1648 a royal British charter recognized the island as a wholly contained colony, independent of both New York and Connecticut. It kept that status until after the American Revolution, when it came under New York State authority due to The Treaty of Paris becoming officially effective on May 12, 1784, when the formal ratifications were exchanged in Paris. East Hampton officially became an organized town known as the Town of East Hampton under New York State law on March 7, 1788, when the State Legislature passed Chapter 64 of the Laws of 1788 ("An Act for Dividing the Counties of this State into Towns").

On June 12, 1640, nine Puritan families from Lynn, Massachusetts landed at what is now known as Conscience Point, in Southampton; some later migrated to present-day East Hampton. Among the first English settlers in East Hampton were John Hand, Thomas Talmage, Daniel Howe, Thomas Thomson, John Mulford, William Hedges, Ralph Dayton, Thomas Chatfield and Thomas Osborn.

The Mulford Farmhouse, on James Lane, is the best-preserved 17th-century English colonial house in East Hampton. The barn dates to 1721, and the complex is operated as a living museum. It is listed on the National Register of Historic Places. The house was built in 1680 for Josiah Hobart, a prominent early settler, named in the first formal deed of conveyance of East Hampton. This was known as the East-Hampton Pattent or Dongan Patent. The 1686 instrument granting the Town of East Hampton to its new proprietors was signed by Thomas Dongan, then Governor of New York. The patent named Capt. Hobart one of "Trustees of the freeholders and commonalty of the town of East-Hampton". Sons of Rev. Peter Hobart, founding minister of Old Ship Church in Hingham, Massachusetts, Josiah Hobart and his brother Joshua both migrated to Long Island with their families. Josiah Hobart settled in East Hampton, where he served as High Sheriff of Suffolk County. His brother Joshua, a minister, went to Southold, where he served the town for 45 years.

Isaac Van Scoy from Amagansett wed Mercy Edwards in February 1757, and during the spring of that year, the couple relocated to the region referred to as Northwest or Alewife Brook Neck, located approximately six miles north of East Hampton Village. This Northwest "Ghost town" settlement during the mid 1800s saw development due to Northwest Harbor, later it was deemed too shallow for deep draft ships and the harbor moved to Sag Harbor, leading to the settlements demise.

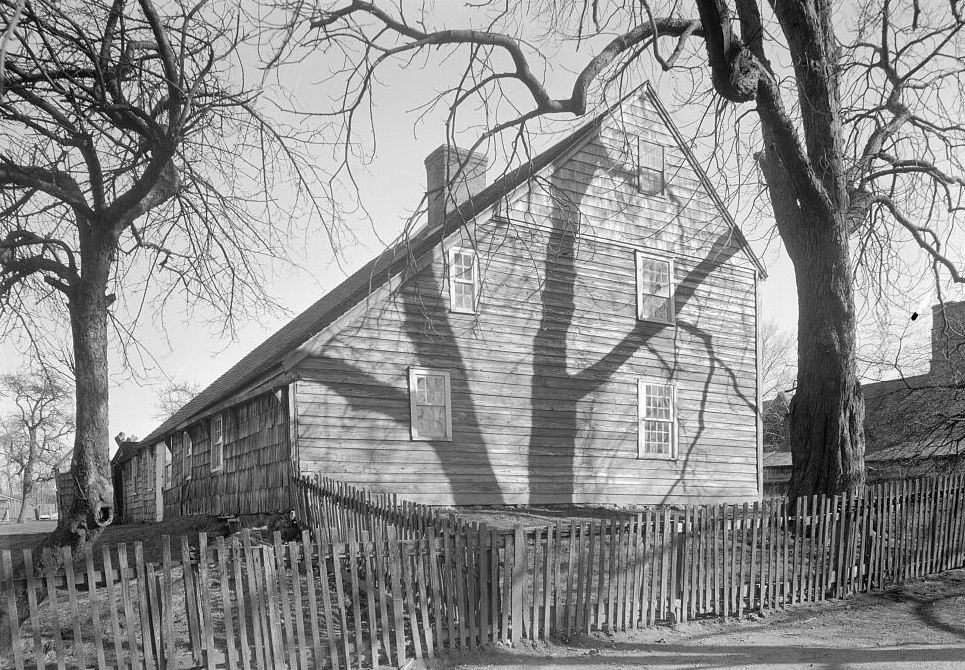
Mulford House, East Hampton

East Hampton was the third Connecticut settlement on the East end of Long Island. East Hampton formally united with Connecticut in 1657. Long Island was formally declared to be part of New York (and also subject to English law) by Charles II of England after four British frigates captured what is today New York City, releasing East Hampton from its Connecticut governance.

East Hampton was first called Maidstone, after Maidstone, Kent, England. The name was later changed to "Easthampton", reflecting the geographic names of its neighbors, Southampton and Westhampton. In 1885 the name was split into two words, after the local newspaper the East Hampton Star began using the two-word name. "Maidstone" is frequently used in place names throughout the town, including the Maidstone Golf Club.

Deep Hollow Ranch, established in 1658 in Montauk, is the oldest continuously operating cattle ranch in the United States.

==== Gallery ====
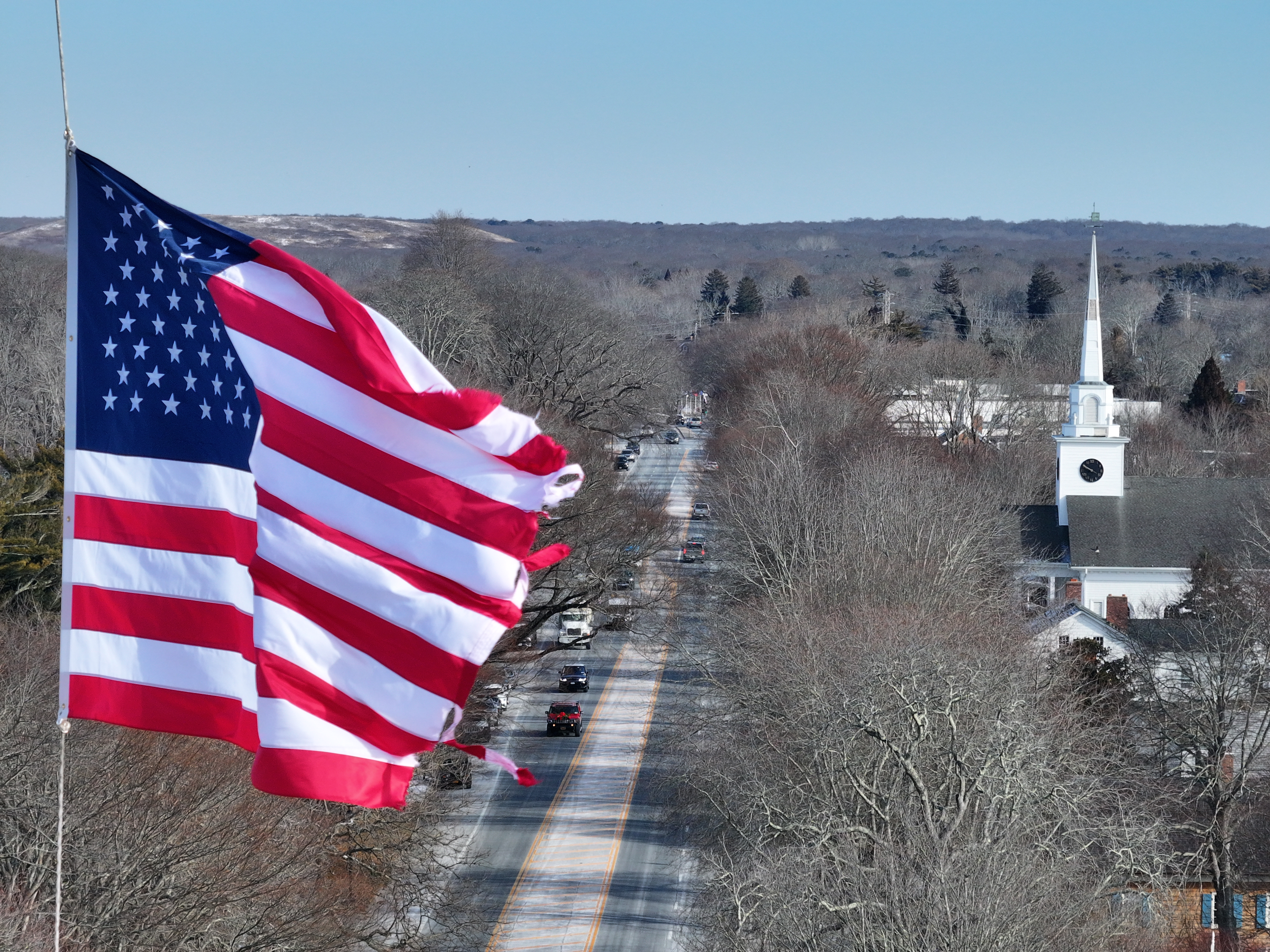
A U.S. flag waving above Montauk Highway

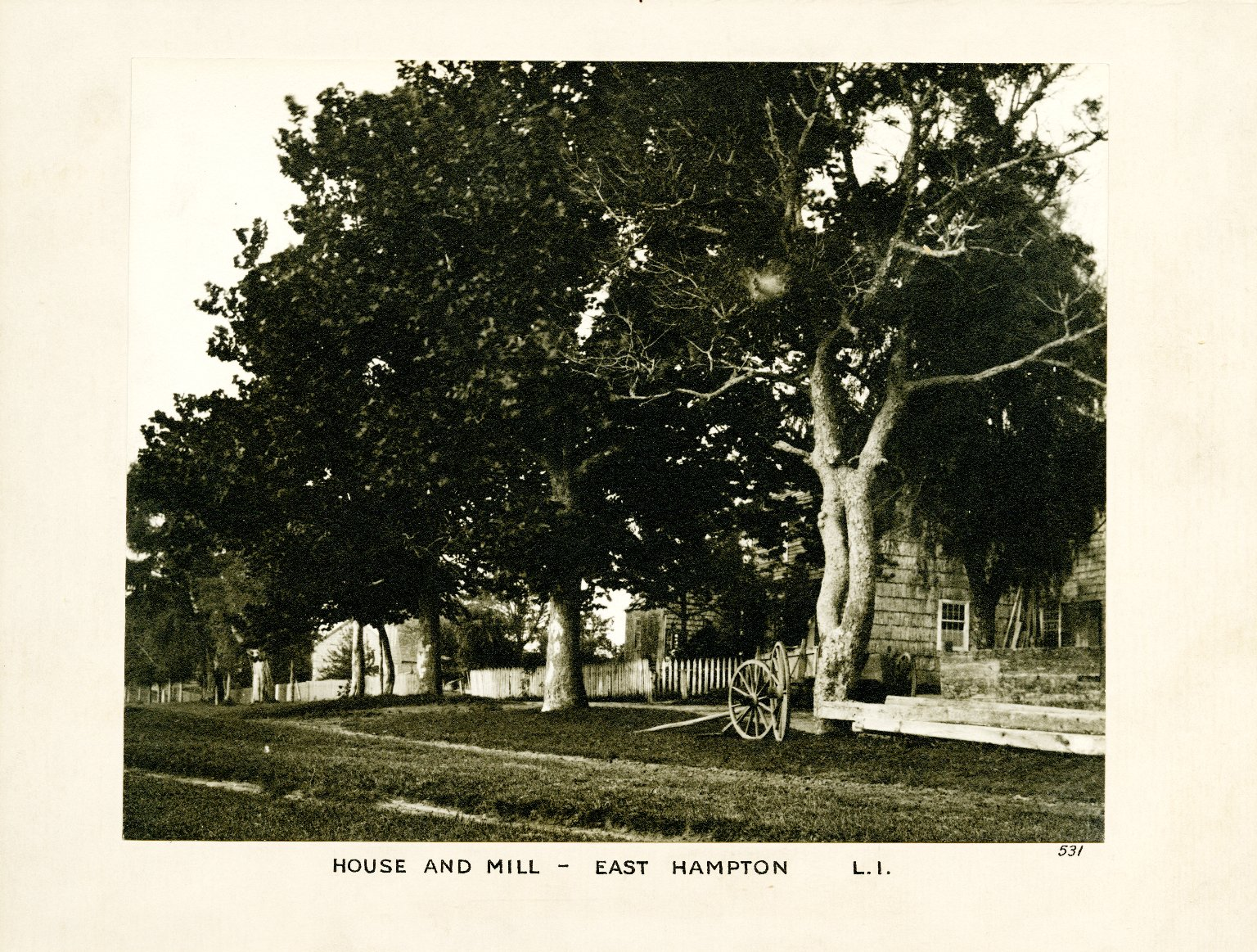
House and Mill, East Hampton, Long Island, c. 1872-1887. George Bradford Brainerd, Brooklyn Museum

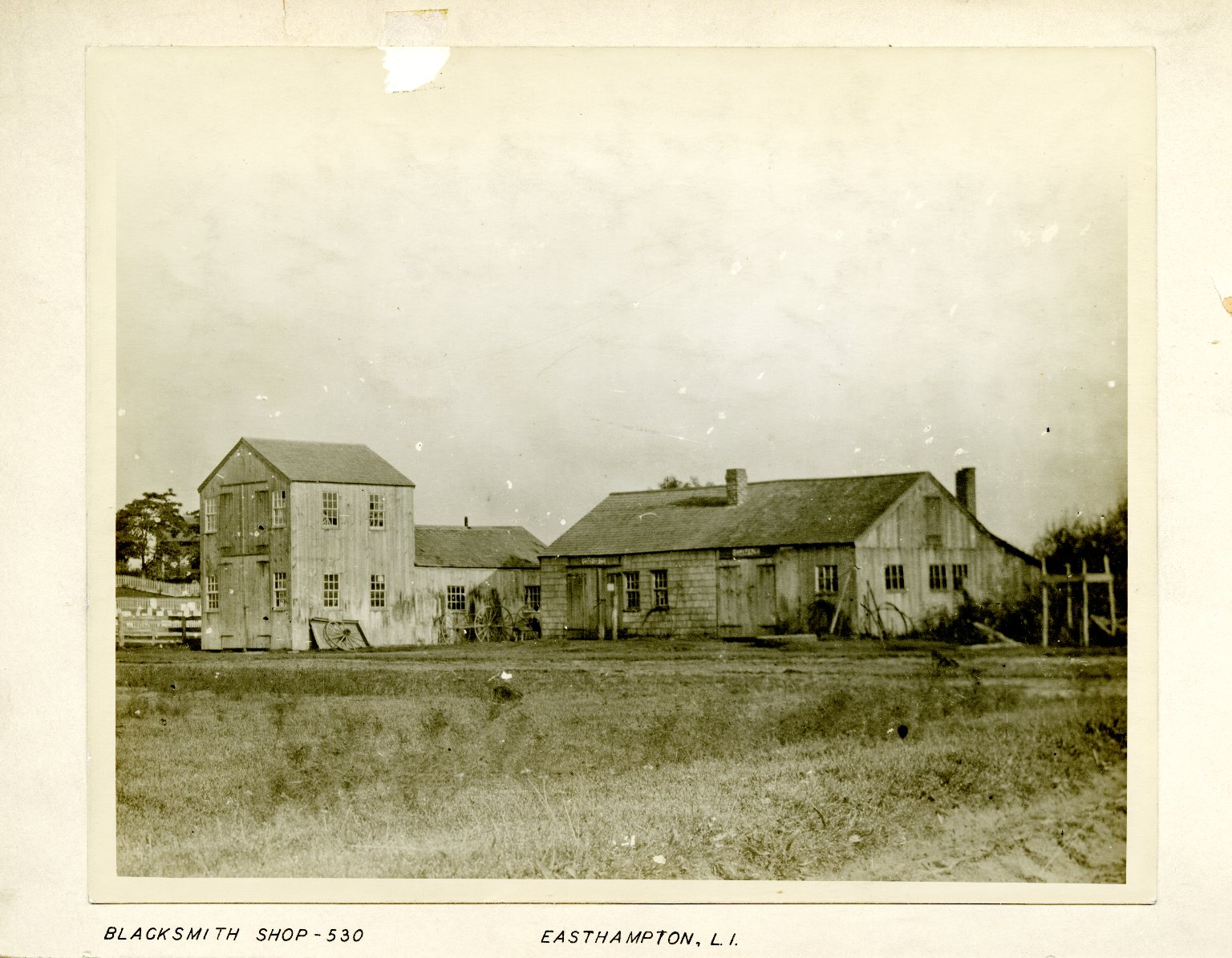
Blacksmith Shop, East Hampton, Long Island, c. 1872-1887. George Bradford Brainerd, Brooklyn Museum

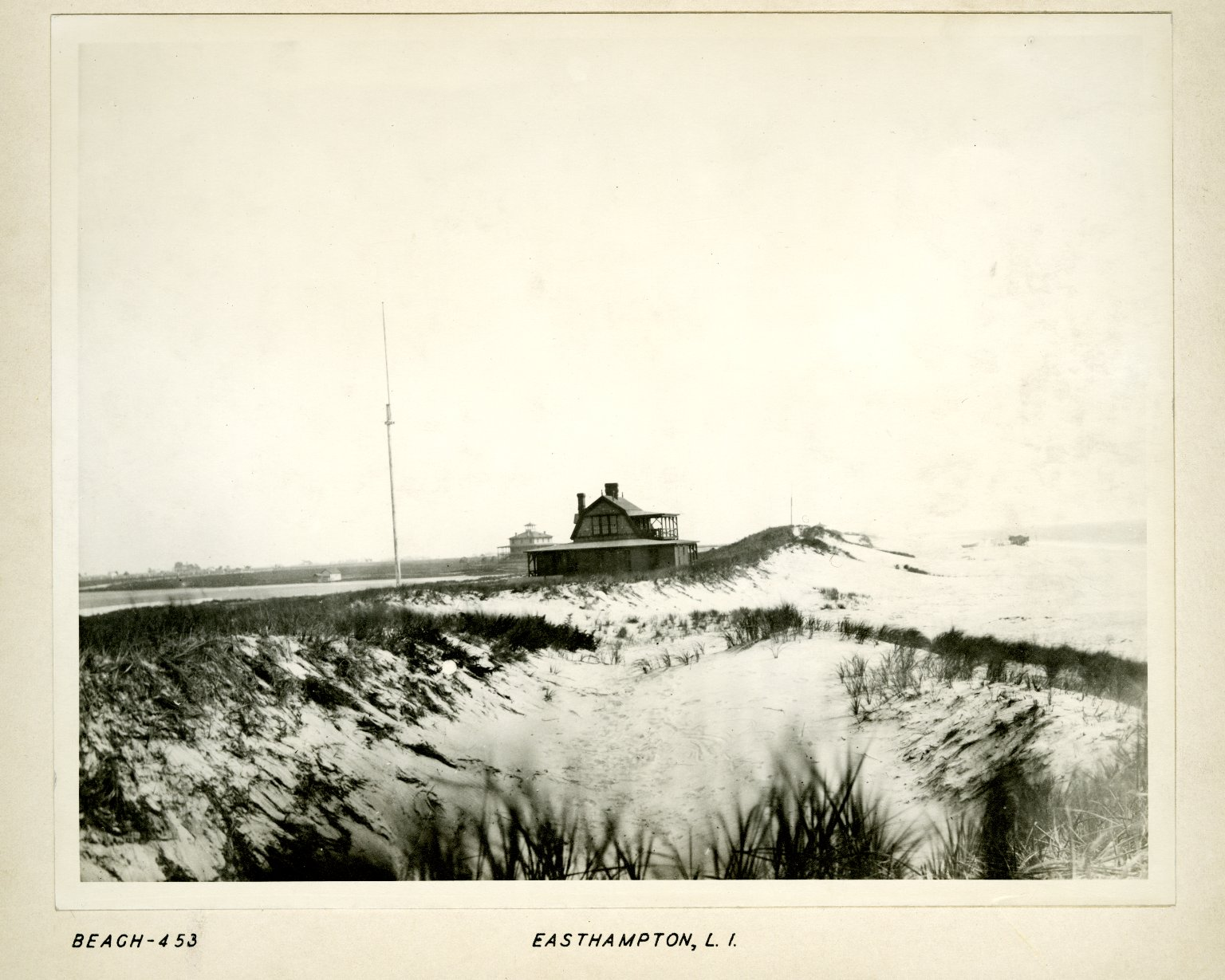
Along Beach, East Hampton, Long Island, c. 1872-1887. George Bradford Brainerd, Brooklyn Museum

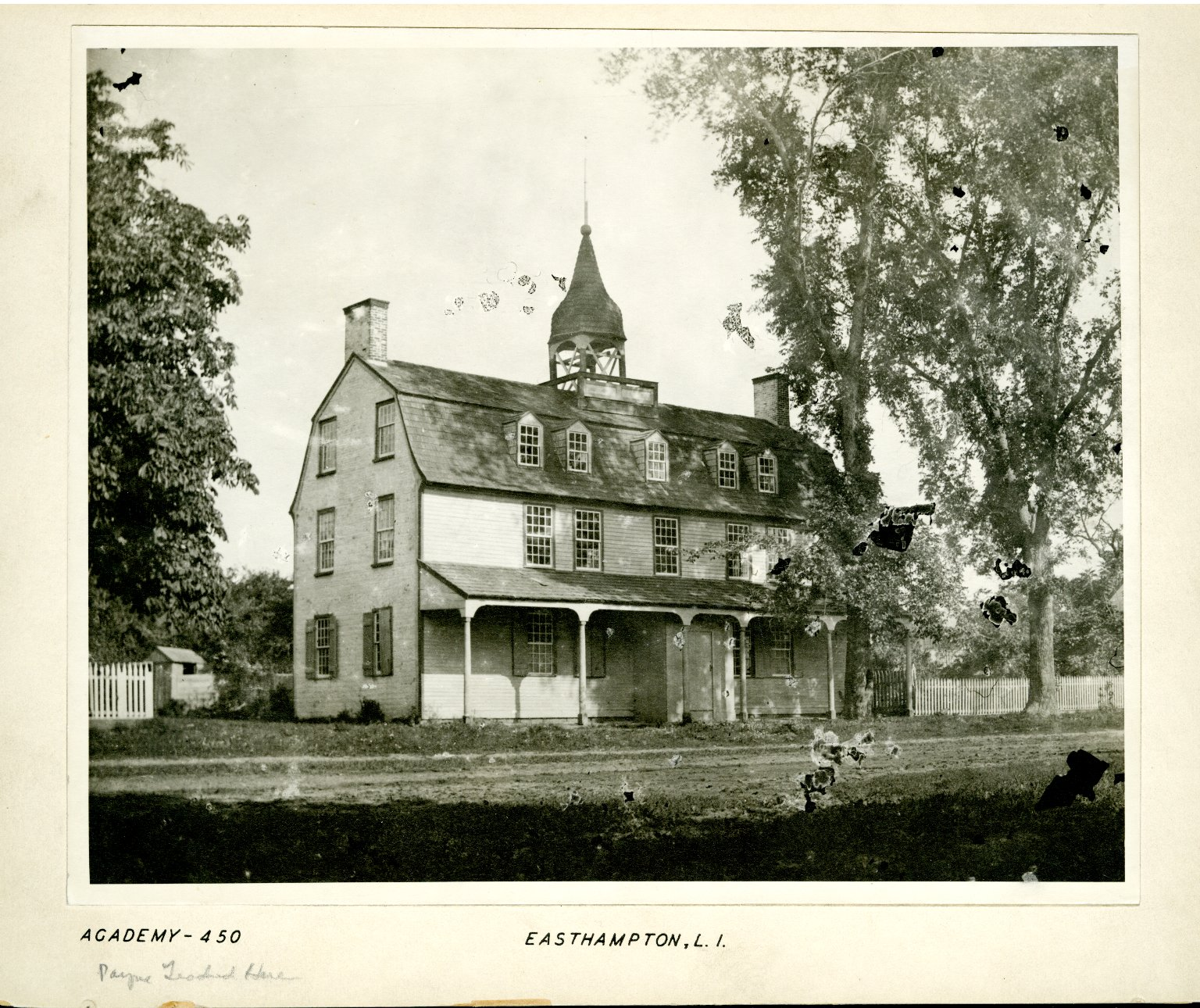
Academy, East Hampton, Long Island, c. 1872-1887

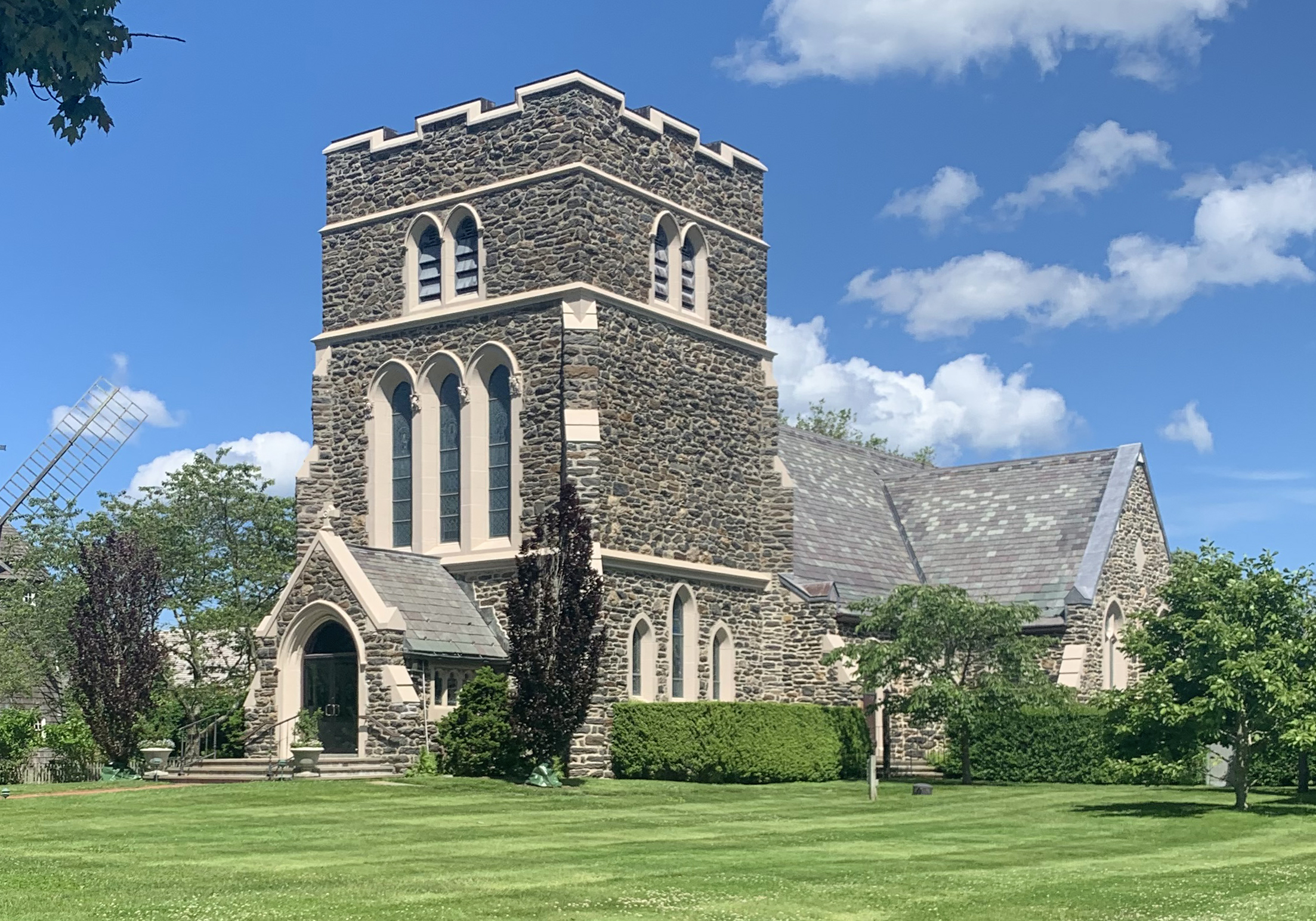
St. Luke's Episcopal Church

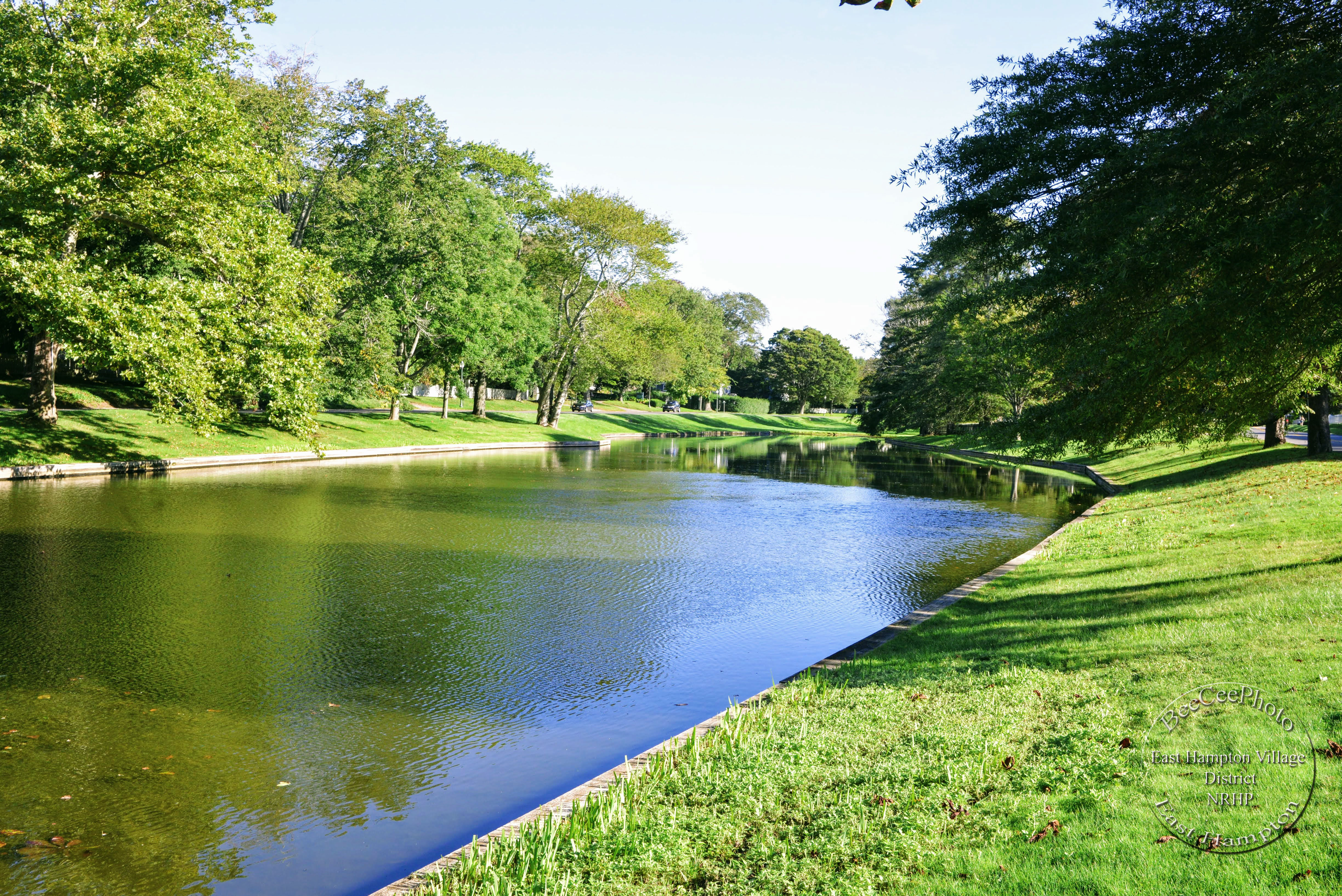
Town Pond

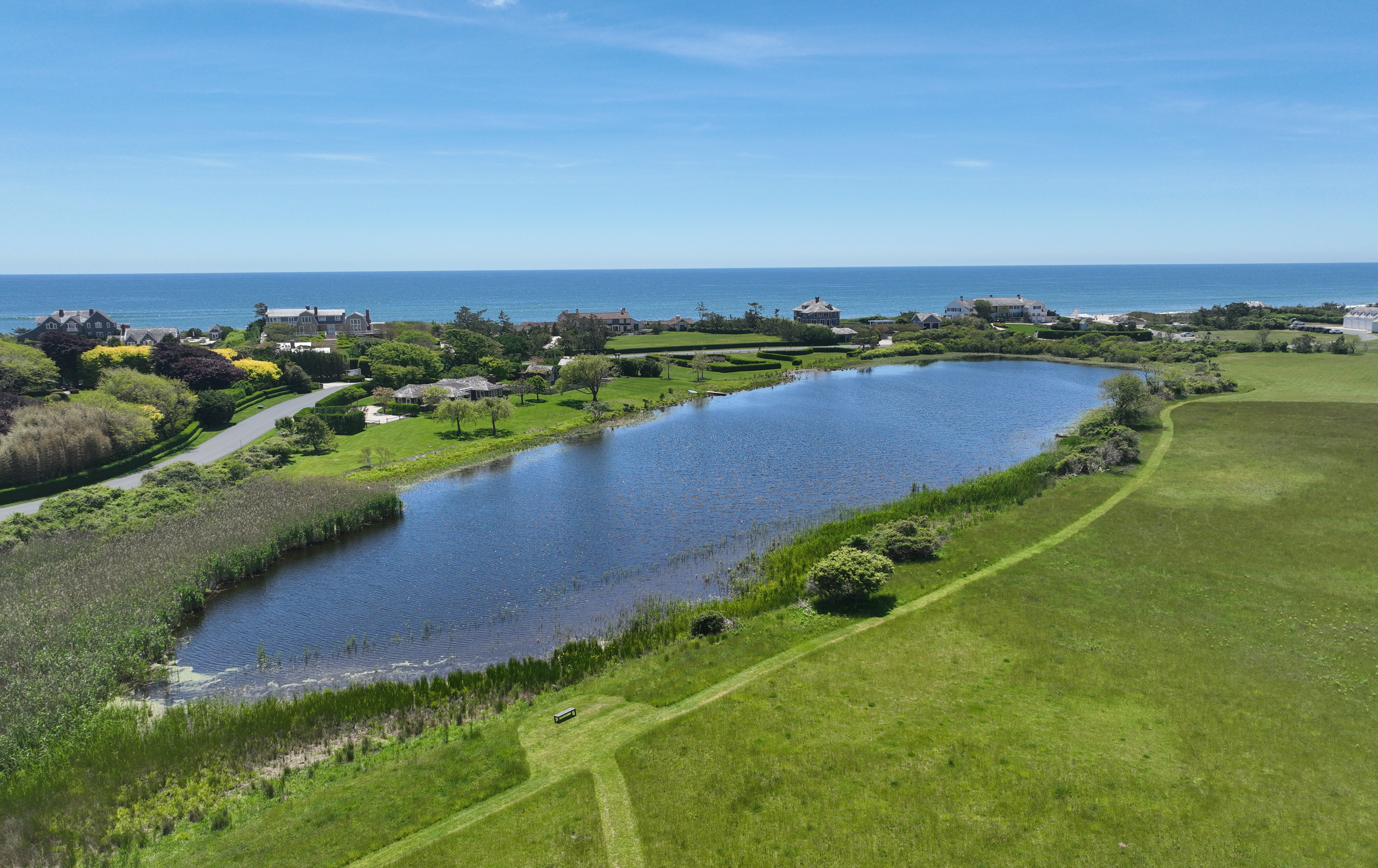
Lily Pond

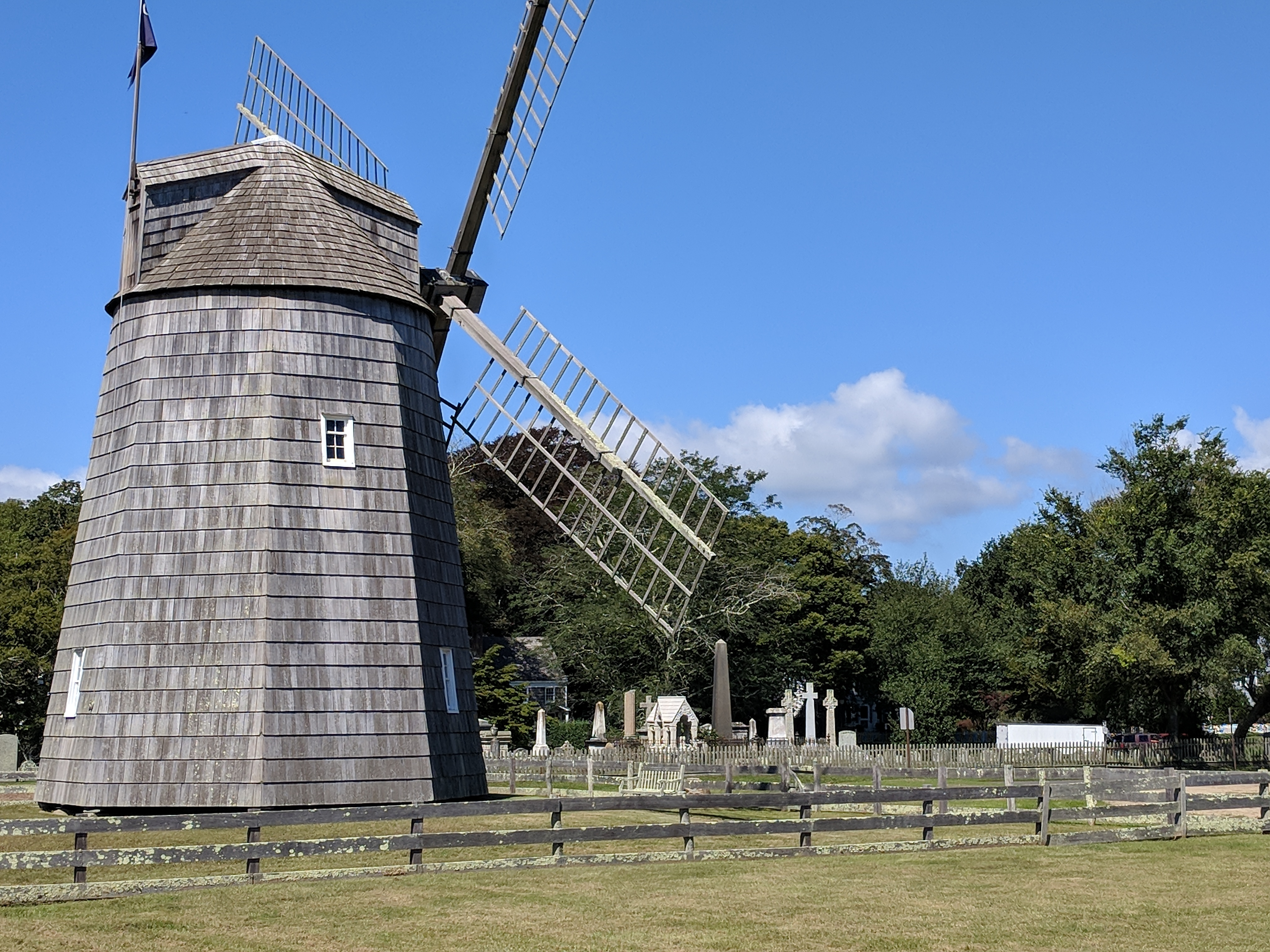
Gardiner Windmill

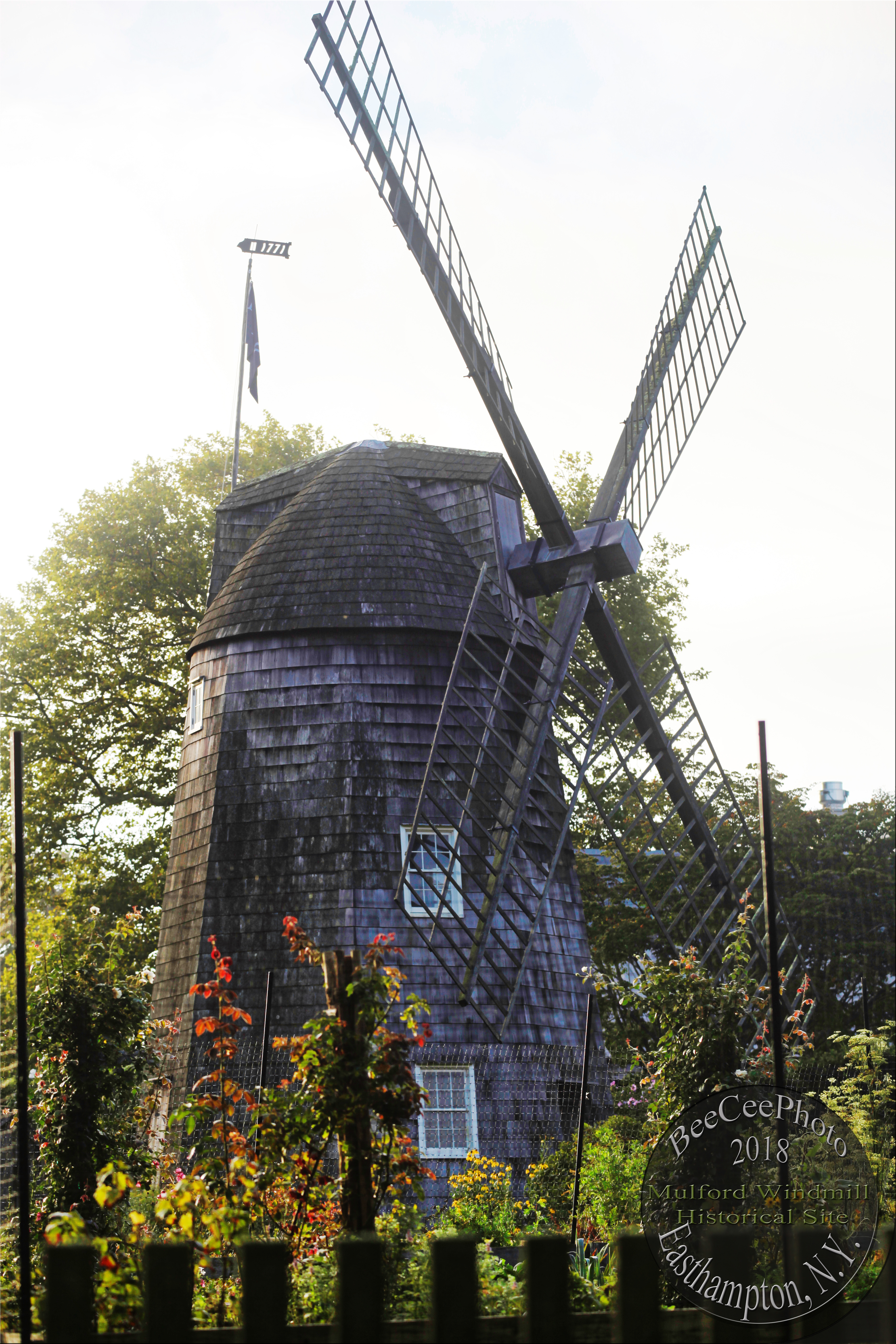
Pantigo Windmill

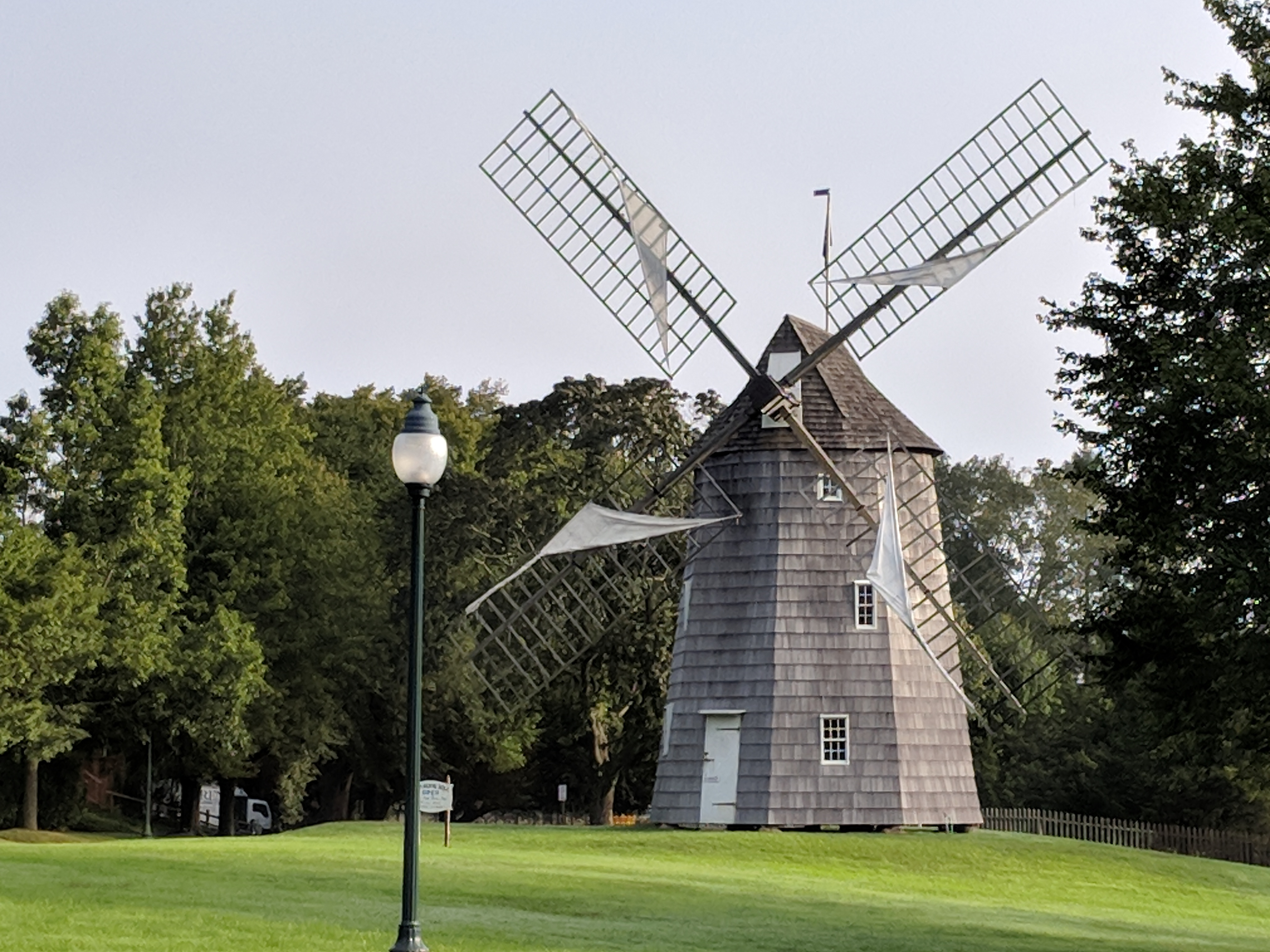
Hook Mill

=== Whaling ===
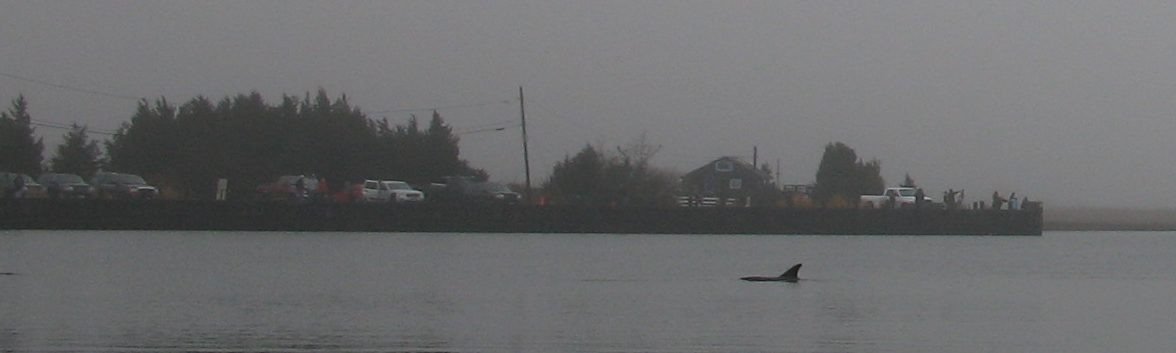
Dolphins at East Hampton's first port- Northwest Landing, 2007

While East Hampton was developed originally for agriculture, the settlers soon discovered that whales frequently beached along the South shore of the town. The whales could be carved up for food and oil. Town laws were written to regulate the proper handling of such carcasses. As the demand for whale products grew, residents became more aggressive in their harvesting techniques. No longer content to settle for harvesting beached whales, they began harvesting live whales that were coming near shore.

Northwest Harbor, located at Northwest Landing on Gardiner's Bay, was the town's first harbor. The harbor turned out to be too shallow for large ships, so a larger port was developed two miles (3 km) West, at Sag Harbor. Some accounts say that it was named because of its relation to the settlement of Sagaponack, New York in the Town of Southampton.

At the peak of the whaling industry, in 1847, some 60 whale ships were based in Sag Harbor, employing 800 men in related businesses. Herman Melville made numerous references to this village in his novel, Moby-Dick. The port rivaled that of New York. After 1847 the whaling industry dropped off dramatically because of the rise of alternative fuel products.

Among the sea captains of Sag Harbor were ancestors of politician Howard Dean, who was born in East Hampton.

The most famous voyages out of Sag Harbor were those by Mercator Cooper. In 1845 he was on an American ship that picked up shipwrecked Japanese sailors in the Bonin Islands and returned them to Tokyo. In 1853 Cooper traveled with an expedition to the far South, where he broke through the ice shelf to become the first person to touch East Antarctica.

East Hampton is still highly influenced by maritime businesses, including tourism. It attracts large summer crowds of residents and tourists. Montauk is New York state's largest fishing port. The Town is famed for its commercial sports fishing, made particularly famous by Frank Mundus. One of the largest buildings in the town is the Promised Land fish meal factory at Napeague.

=== Presidents and First Ladies ===
First Ladies Julia Gardiner Tyler and Jacqueline Bouvier Kennedy Onassis spent their childhoods there. Theodore Roosevelt was briefly quarantined in Montauk, at Camp Wyckoff, after returning from the Spanish–American War. Bill and Hillary Clinton spent week-long summer vacations in 1998 and 1999.

==== Julia Gardiner Tyler ====
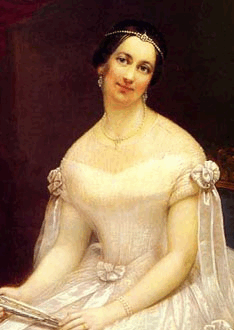
Julia Gardiner Tyler

Julia Gardiner was born on Gardiners Island and her father had a house in East Hampton village. On February 28, 1844, she and her father, David Gardiner, were part of the Presidential party aboard the USS Princeton when a malfunctioning cannon exploded. Her father and two Cabinet officers were killed. According to legend Julia fainted into the arms of President John Tyler (who had earlier lost his first wife). They married four months later, creating a national scandal, since there was a 30-year difference in their ages.

Although Tyler was a member of the wealthy Gardiner family and a former First Lady of the United States, she had economic problems after the American Civil War. She and her husband had supported the Confederate States of America. She is buried with the President in Hollywood Cemetery in Richmond, Virginia, the Confederate capital during the war and the capital of Virginia. Her father and one of her sons are buried in the South End Burial Ground in East Hampton.

==== Jacqueline Bouvier Kennedy Onassis ====
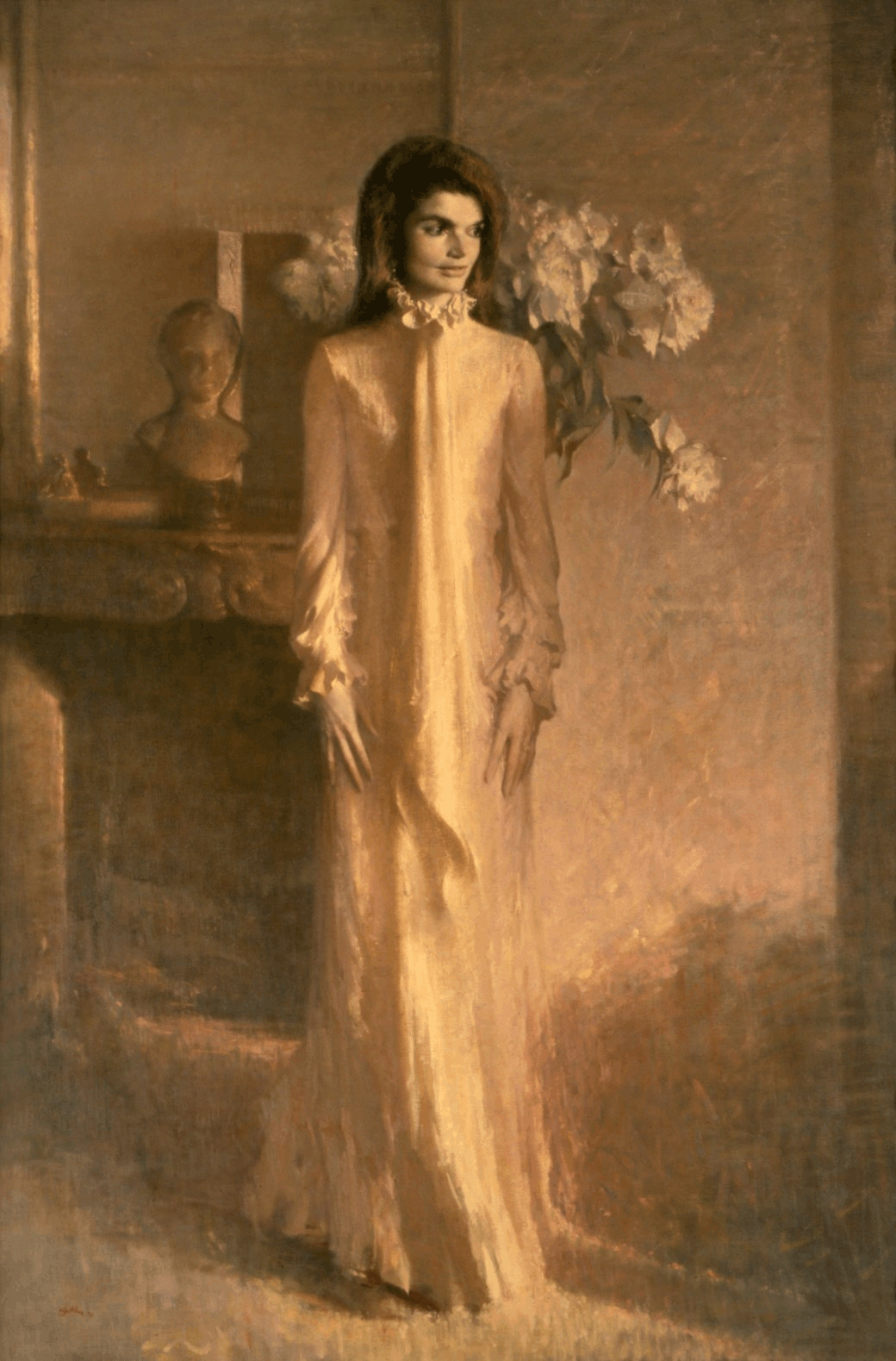
Jacqueline Bouvier Kennedy Onassis

Jacqueline Kennedy Onassis was born at Southampton Hospital on July 28, 1929. She would have been born in New York City but she was six weeks late. Her parents, Janet Norton Lee and John Vernou Bouvier III, known as "Black Jack," were staying at Lasata, the East Hampton home of her paternal grandfather, Major John Vernou Bouvier Jr.

Her parents had been married at St. Philomena's Catholic Church in East Hampton on July 7, 1928. The reception was held at the East Hampton village home of her maternal grandparents, James T. Lee and Margaret Lee, located on Lily Pond.

Her family were members of the Maidstone Club. She and her younger sister, Lee Bouvier, spent their summers at the house in East Hampton until she was 10, when her parents divorced. Her connection to East Hampton received renewed national attention in the 1970s. It was covered in news reports following the release of the 1975 documentary Grey Gardens, which explored the lives of her aunt, Edith Ewing Bouvier Beale, and cousin, Edith Bouvier Beale. They were revealed to be living in poverty in a mansion of that name. Jacqueline and her husband Aristotle Onassis donated money to improve the lives of her relatives. (The documentary was adapted as a Broadway musical of the same name. A documentary on the estate was released in 2006.)

Jacqueline's aunt and uncle, Winifred Lee and Franklin d'Olier, continued to own the Lily Pond Lane home of her maternal grandparents until 2002. The Bouvier family cemetery plot is at Most Holy Trinity Catholic Cemetery on Cedar Street. Jackie's father, maternal grandmother, paternal grandparents, and paternal great-grandparents, as well as various relatives, including Edith Ewing Bouvier Beale, are buried in the cemetery.

==== Bill and Hillary Clinton ====
In 1998 and 1999 as talk surfaced that Hillary Clinton was considering a Senate run from New York, they began summering in East Hampton, where they stayed at the Georgica Pond home of Steven Spielberg. Clinton gave a Saturday radio chat from the Amagansett fire station.

In June 2008, at the conclusion of Hillary Clinton's Presidential bid, she stayed at the Wiborg Beach home of Thomas H. Lee in East Hampton Village.

=== African-American history ===
East Hampton has played an important role in African-American history. After the American Revolutionary War, New York passed a gradual abolition law, making children free who were born to slave mothers. But the last slaves were not freed until 1827. During the War of 1812, the Gardiners used slaves to transport supplies back and forth to Gardiner's Island. According to the Gardiners, slaves were easier to pass through British blockades since it was "obvious" that they were "owned."

During this period Sag Harbor rose to a port status, rivaling New York, due to its whale oil trade. Many slaves worked on the docks in connection with shipping and the whale trade. After slavery had ended, Gardiner's former slaves developed small houses in Freetown (East Hampton), just north of East Hampton village. Sag Harbor's freedmen developed the Eastville community in Sag Harbor.

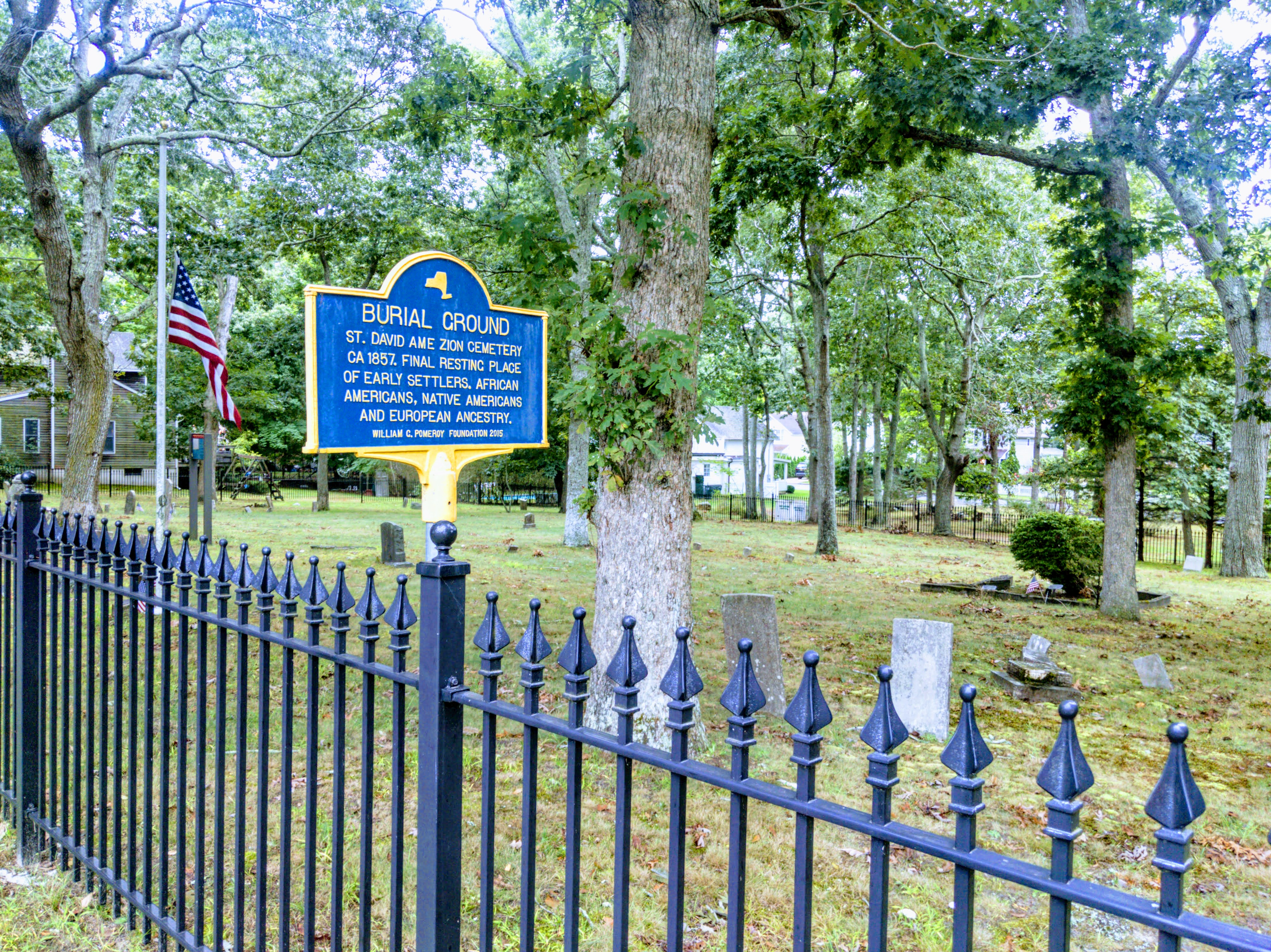
St David AME Zion Cemetery

In 1808 the United States and Great Britain cooperated in ending the African slave trade, but Spain continued to transport slaves to its Caribbean and Latin American colonies. On August 26, 1839, crew from La Amistad, an illegal slave ship that had been commandeered by its captives off Cuba, dropped anchor at Culloden Point and came ashore at Montauk to get supplies. The slaves, who were inexperienced navigators, thought they were on course to Africa. Members of the U.S. Navy ship USS Washington, seeing the slaves on shore, arrested them and took them to Connecticut.

This was an international case, with Spain arguing for the return of the ship and slaves (or compensation). The United States had its own laws to interpret. The Mende people who had been illegally taken argued for their freedom. Amistad case was ultimately decided by the U.S. Supreme Court in 1841. John Quincy Adams argued for the Africans. The court decided in their favor, opining that the initial capture of the Mende by the Spanish was illegal, so they were classified as free men defending their freedom and were not charged under slave law with mutiny or revolt. East Hampton film director Steven Spielberg popularized the slave revolt and Supreme Court case in the 1997 film Amistad.

One of the Amistad former slaves stayed in the United States after the trial. He worked as a valet for President John Tyler. He was killed aboard USS Princeton along with David Gardiner and two Cabinet officers, when one of the cannons exploded during a demonstration.

In 1845 African-American sailor Pyrrhus Concer of Sag Harbor was aboard the Manhattan, a ship captained by Mercator Cooper, which picked up shipwrecked Japanese sailors in the Bonin Islands. The ship was allowed to enter Tokyo Bay under escort to return the sailors. As Japan had been closed to foreign shipping, it was the first American ship to visit Tokyo. Concer was the first African American the Japanese had seen. He is depicted in their drawings of the event.

=== Playground for the rich ===
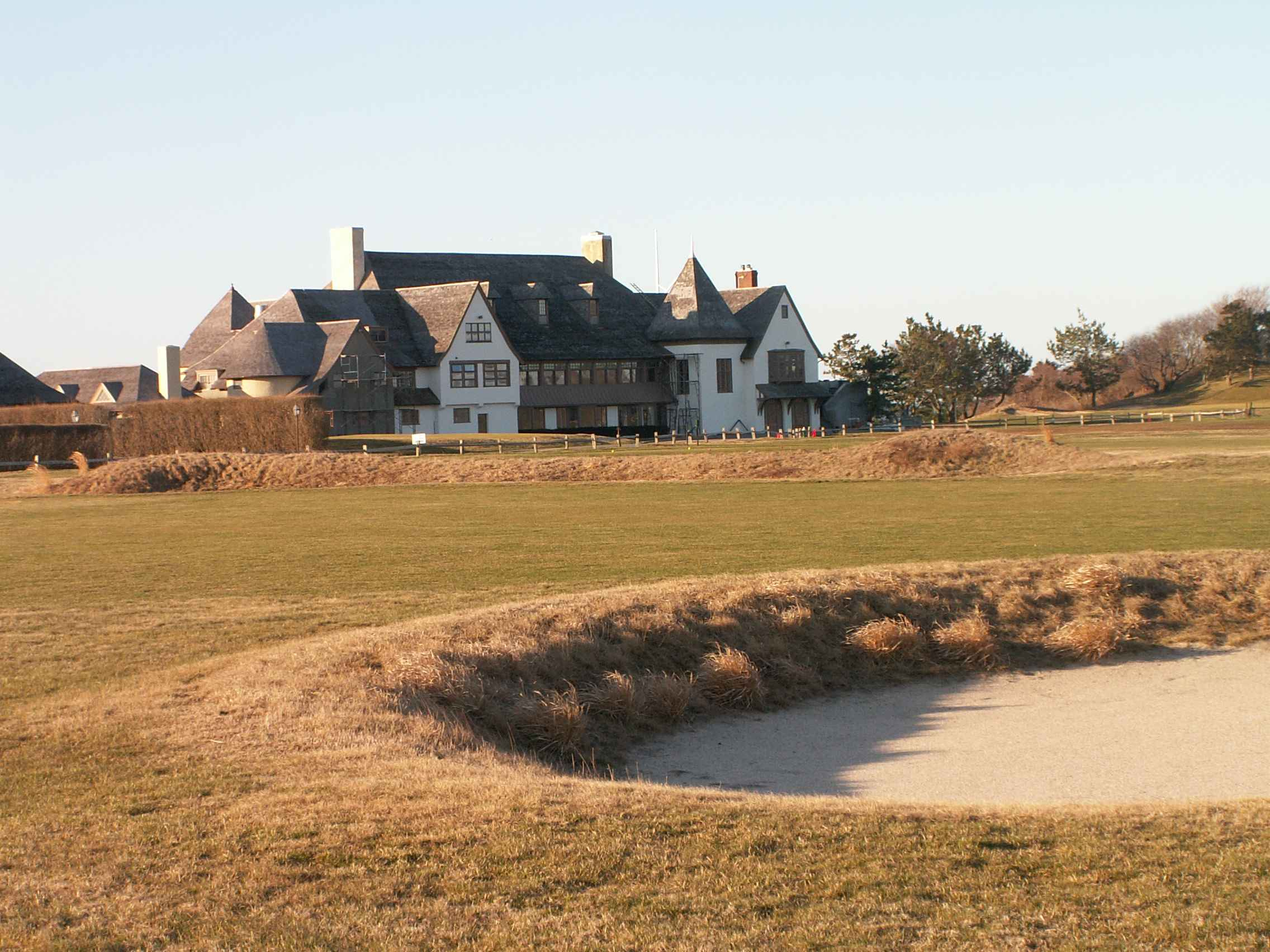
Maidstone Club

East Hampton from its earliest days with the settlement of Gardiners Island has had a reputation as being a home for the wealthy especially after the Gardiners married into almost all the wealthy New York City families.

More than one hundred miles from Manhattan, East Hampton remained largely undeveloped until 1880 when Austin Corbin extended the Long Island Rail Road from Bridgehampton to Montauk. As part of the development, Arthur W. Benson forced an auction and paid US$151,000 for 10,000 acres (40 km^{2}) around Montauk. He forced the eviction of the Montaukket Native Americans there.

Benson brought in architect Stanford White to design six "cottages", mansions near Ditch Plains in Montauk. They formed the Montauk Association to govern their exclusive neighborhood. With new access to the village of East Hampton from New York, wealthy families ventured east from Southampton and built mansions in East Hampton. The Maidstone Golf Club opened in 1891. Among the early "cottages" was Tick Hall, later owned in the late 20th century by TV figure Dick Cavett. It burned in 1993, but Cavett had it restored. He had the process filmed for a television documentary.

Corbin had industrial ambitions associated with extending the train to Montauk. He thought a new port city would develop around the train station on Fort Pond Bay, and that oceangoing ships from Europe would dock there. Passengers could take the train into New York City–thus saving a day in transit.

The grand plans for Montauk did not pan out. The land was sold to the United States Army. Theodore Roosevelt made a much publicized visit to Camp Wyckoff there at the end of the Spanish–American War.

In 1926, Carl G. Fisher intended to revive the dream of an urban Montauk, with plans to develop it as a destination, the Miami Beach of the north. He bought the former Benson property for $2.5 million (it was sold as surplus government property following the end of World War I). He built the six-story Montauk Improvement Building in downtown Montauk (which is still the town's tallest occupied structure—as subsequent zoning has forbidden highrise structures), the Montauk Manor (which was a luxury hotel), dredged Lake Montauk and opened it to Block Island Sound to support his Montauk Yacht Club and the associated Star Island Casino, as well as the Montauk Downs golf club.

Fisher lost his fortune in the Stock Market Crash of 1929. The land was sold back to the military in World War II. During World War II, the Army developed its land for Army, Navy and Air Force bases.

Through the years, East Hampton's wealth has evolved. The village has grown, and former farmland dominated by potato fields has been developed for residential housing. The village of East Hampton is considered to have the most dazzling row of mansions, located along Further Lane and Lily Pond Lane parallel to the ocean.

While ostentatious displays of wealth occurred near the ocean ("south of the Montauk Highway"), much simpler houses and bungalows have been built in such areas as Springs and Montauk. In the 1950s and 1960s, following the Kitchen Debate between Nikita Khrushchev and Richard Nixon, more cheap affordable prefabricated homes called Leisurama were built as second homes in Montauk at Culloden Point.

In November 2006, the median price of a house in the Town was US $895,000 compared with a national median for the U.S. of $225,000. Several houses in East Hampton now sell for prices in the tens of millions of dollars. Living in East Hampton is relatively expensive, in 2007 the cost of living was 168% of the national average.

The entertainer and businessman Sean Combs held many of his White Parties at his house on Hedges Banks Drive in East Hampton. The New York Times wrote that in the 2000s "few events held the cultural cachet" that the White Parties did. The parties saw a broad range of social and cultural elites socialising together as "veteran celebrities mixed with of-the-moment stars and the high-society set at gatherings that often had civic-minded causes" according to the New York Times. The writer Steven Gaines said that initially the residents of The Hamptons thought "the first party was the end of the world ... They were afraid of a noisy showbiz crowd and thought it was going to be an invasion, and it turned out not to be". Combs's neighbors in the Hamptons were pacified with limousine rides and complimentary meals at expensive restaurants to abate noise complaints.

==== Service community ====
A portion of the community consists of working people who provide services to the wealthy community. The service community within the town of East Hampton is centered in Springs which contains the more modest housing available.

=== Artists' colony ===
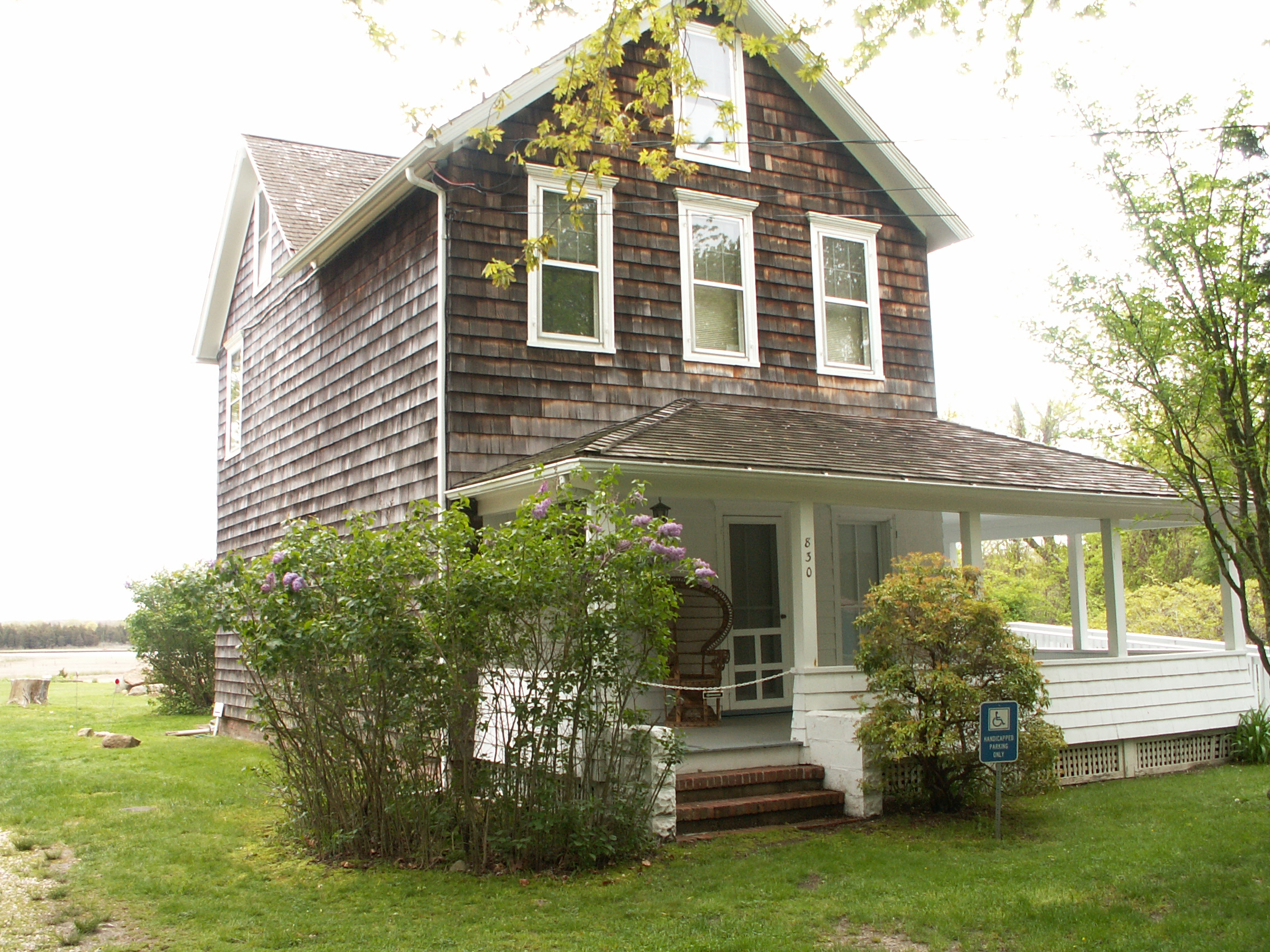
Pollock-Krasner house in Springs

East Hampton's reputation as an artists' colony began with painter Jackson Pollock, who resided in Springs, New York in the 1940s and 1950s, with Lee Krasner, at what is now known as the Pollock-Krasner House and Studio. Many of his most famous paintings were painted in the barn, which he had converted into a studio. The property is now open to the public for tours, by appointment. It is now owned by Stony Brook University with scheduled appointments to view his studio, which was left unchanged after his death.

Among the other artists who popularized East Hampton as an artists' colony were Willem de Kooning, Mark Rothko, Franz Kline, Ian Hornak, Larry Rivers, Alfonso Ossorio, Robert Motherwell, Andy Warhol, John Ferren, Thomas Moran, Louis Schanker, and Charlotte Park as well as art dealers Leo Castelli and Ileana Sonnabend.

Pollock died in 1956 while driving with his mistress, Ruth Kligman, and a friend of hers, on Springs Fireplace Road, after picking them up at the Long Island Railroad station in East Hampton.

Pollock and Krasner are buried in Green River Cemetery, in Springs, along with many of the artists of their generation. Pollock's influence continues to be felt in the community.

Marcia Gay Harden won a 2000 Academy Award for Best Supporting Actress for portraying Krasner in Pollock, which was shot in East Hampton as the dream project of Ed Harris, who was also nominated for Best Actor.

An ongoing debate rages over whether 24 paintings and drawings found in a Wainscott locker in 2003 are Pollock originals. Physicists have argued over whether fractals can be used to authenticate the paintings. The debate is still inconclusive.

Andy Warhol and his longtime collaborator, Paul Morrissey, had a large, waterfront estate in Montauk called Eothen. Among their guests were Jacqueline Onassis, Lee Radziwill, the Rolling Stones, Bianca Jagger, Jerry Hall, Liza Minnelli, Elizabeth Taylor, John Lennon, John Phillips, and Halston.

In 1993, the Andy Warhol Foundation donated 15.6 acres (63,000 m^{2}) of the estate to the Nature Conservancy for the Andy Warhol Visual Arts Preserve, which is run in conjunction with Art Barge in nearby Napeague.

=== Natural disasters ===
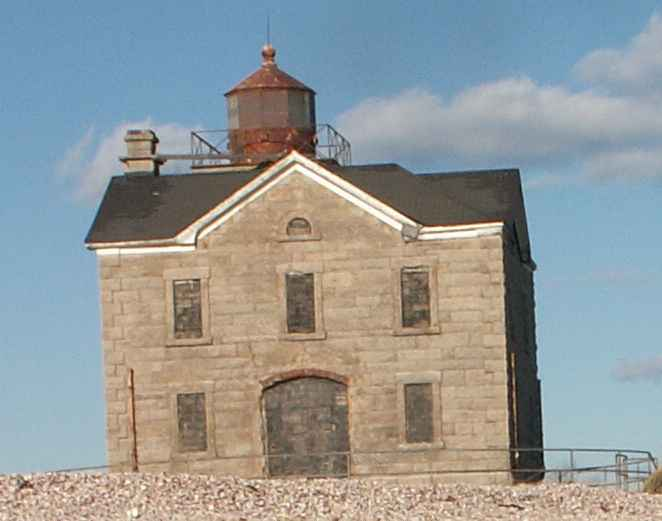
Cedar Point Lighthouse

Two major natural disasters that affected East Hampton include the Hurricane of 1938 and Hurricane Carol, in 1954, both of which found the Atlantic Ocean splitting the town in two at Napeague. The 1938 storm also washed up so much sand that the Cedar Point Lighthouse, which had been on an island, became connected to the mainland. The 1954 storm also toppled the MacKay Radio towers at Napeague.

East Hampton does not have the barrier beaches that run almost the entire length of the south shore of Long Island from Coney Island to Southampton. East Hampton's ocean beaches are connected to the mainland, which prevents them from being washed over in storms.

Due to storms on Fort Pond Bay, the hamlet of Montauk was actually moved by the Navy at the end of World War II. The hamlet was originally located at the train station, but was constantly being flooded.

East Hampton is regularly hit by hurricanes and Nor'easters. Given the town's generally flat topography, water often accumulates on town roads stranding motorists in heavy rains.

The town's most serious environmental problem is beach erosion. The town has severely restricted development on ocean front property, thus limiting impact. The Montauk Lighthouse, which used to be almost 300 feet (91 m) from the cliffs is now 56 feet (17 m) from the cliffs. The most threatened areas now are in the hamlet of Montauk, which is the only community in the town with its business district next to the ocean, as are the oceanfront estates of East Hampton. At Georgica Pond the United States Corps of Engineers built Groynes to protect the mansions. The construction is a source of friction with Southampton, which says the jetties interrupt the longshore drift, greatly increasing beach erosion there.

The lack of beach front development, including the fact there are no boardwalk promenades, which are features of many developed beach communities, has contributed to East Hampton beaches being listed among the best beaches in the country.

=== Military history ===
While East Hampton is considered almost exclusively a residential community, it has been the home of United States Navy, United States Army, and United States Air Force bases, the last of which closed in the 1980s. It currently has a United States Coast Guard headquarters.

Skirmishes and military incidents took place in the town from the 17th century through World War II.

==== Massacre Valley ====
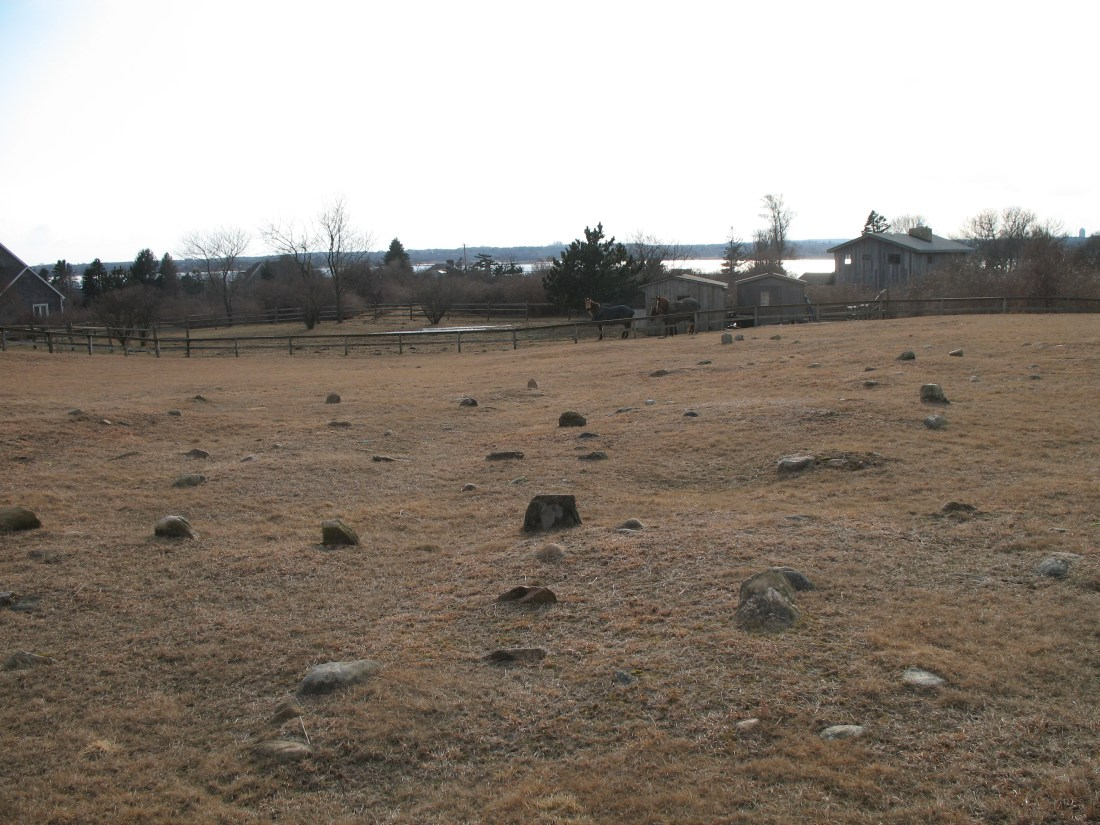
Montaukett grave in Montauk. The only recognizable grave is that of Stephen Talkhouse

The biggest recorded loss of life in the various skirmishes and conflicts in East Hampton was "Massacre Valley" in 1653 in Montauk when 30 members of the Montaukett tribe were killed by members of the Narragansett tribe at the foot of what is now Montauk Manor.

The Montauketts had a thriving wampum (made from whelk shells on the East Hampton beaches) trade Connecticut tribes. The arrangements were disrupted in 1637 by the Pequot War which was to solidify English domination of New England and change the balance of power among Native American tribes.

The Pequot War was to contribute to the Montauketts selling Gardiners Island, East Hampton and Southampton to the English with the understanding the English would protect the Montauketts from attacks from Connecticut. However a war broke out between the Montauketts and the Narragansett, the nominal Native American victors in Pequot War.

In 1653 the Narragansetts under Ninigret attacked and burned the Montaukett village, killed 30 and captured one of Wyandanch's daughters. The daughter was ransomed with the aid of Lion Gardiner (who in turn was to get large portion of Smithtown, New York in appreciation). The Montauketts temporarily moved closer to East Hampton village and the English ordered ships in Long Island Sound to sink Narragansett canoes. The skirmishes were to end in 1657.

==== Captain Kidd ====
East Hampton had pirates on its waterways in the 17th century and early 18th century, the most notable of which was Captain Kidd who was hanged after his booty on Gardiners Island was introduced at his trial.

Kidd is said to have buried treasure all over Long Island. He parted ways after his east indian adventures with his quartermaster, Hendrick van der Heul, at Little Northwest Creek, near Sag Harbor in 1699 after dividing up the booty from the voyage. Money Ponds at the Montauk Lighthouse are named because of treasure reported to have been left there.

In June 1699 Kidd was stopped on the island while sailing to Boston to try to clear his name. With the permission of the proprietor, Mrs. Gardiner, he buried $30,000 in treasure in a ravine between Bostwick's Point and the Manor House. For her troubles he gave her a piece of gold cloth (a piece of which is now at the East Hampton library) that was captured from a Moorish ship off Madagascar, as well as a bag of sugar. Kidd warned that if it was not there when he returned he would kill Gardiner. Kidd was tried in Boston and Gardiner was ordered to deliver the treasure as evidence. The booty included gold dust, bars of silver, Spanish dollars, rubies, diamonds, candlesticks and porringers. Gardiner kept one of the diamonds, which he gave his daughter. A plaque on the island marks the spot, but it's on private property.

==== American Revolution ====
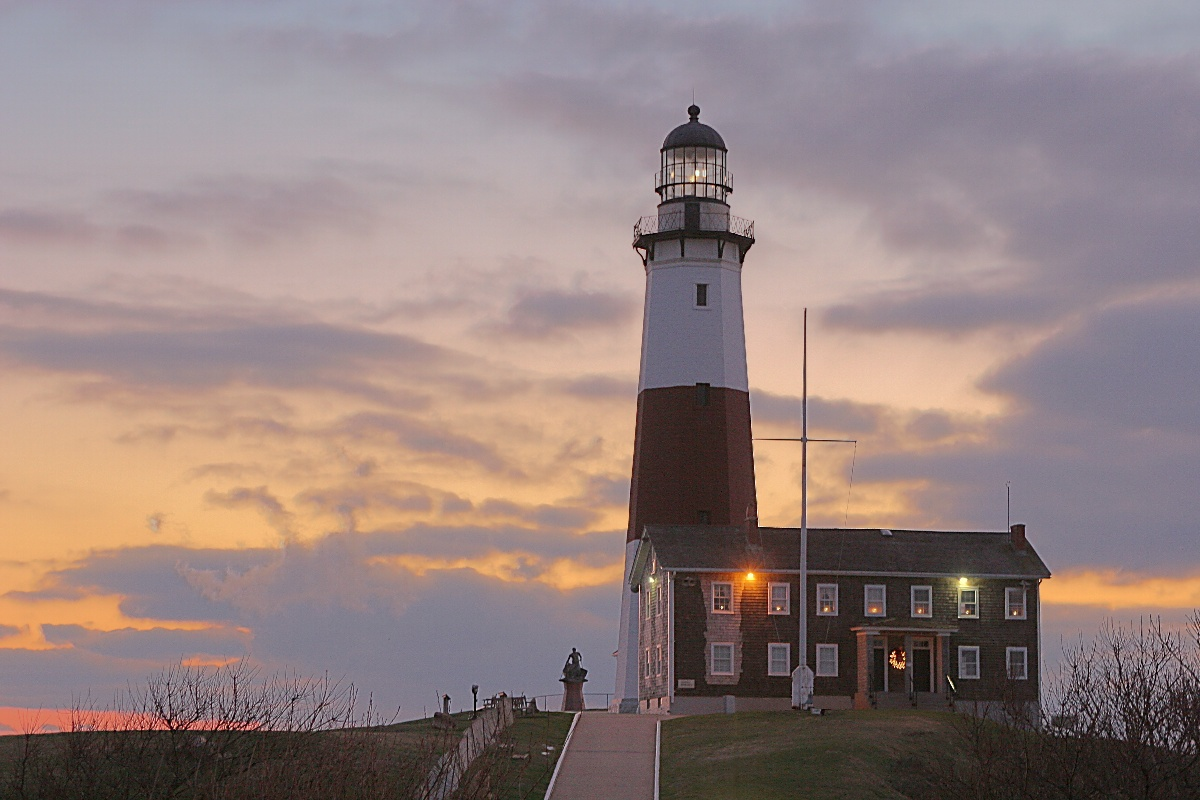
Montauk Point Lighthouse

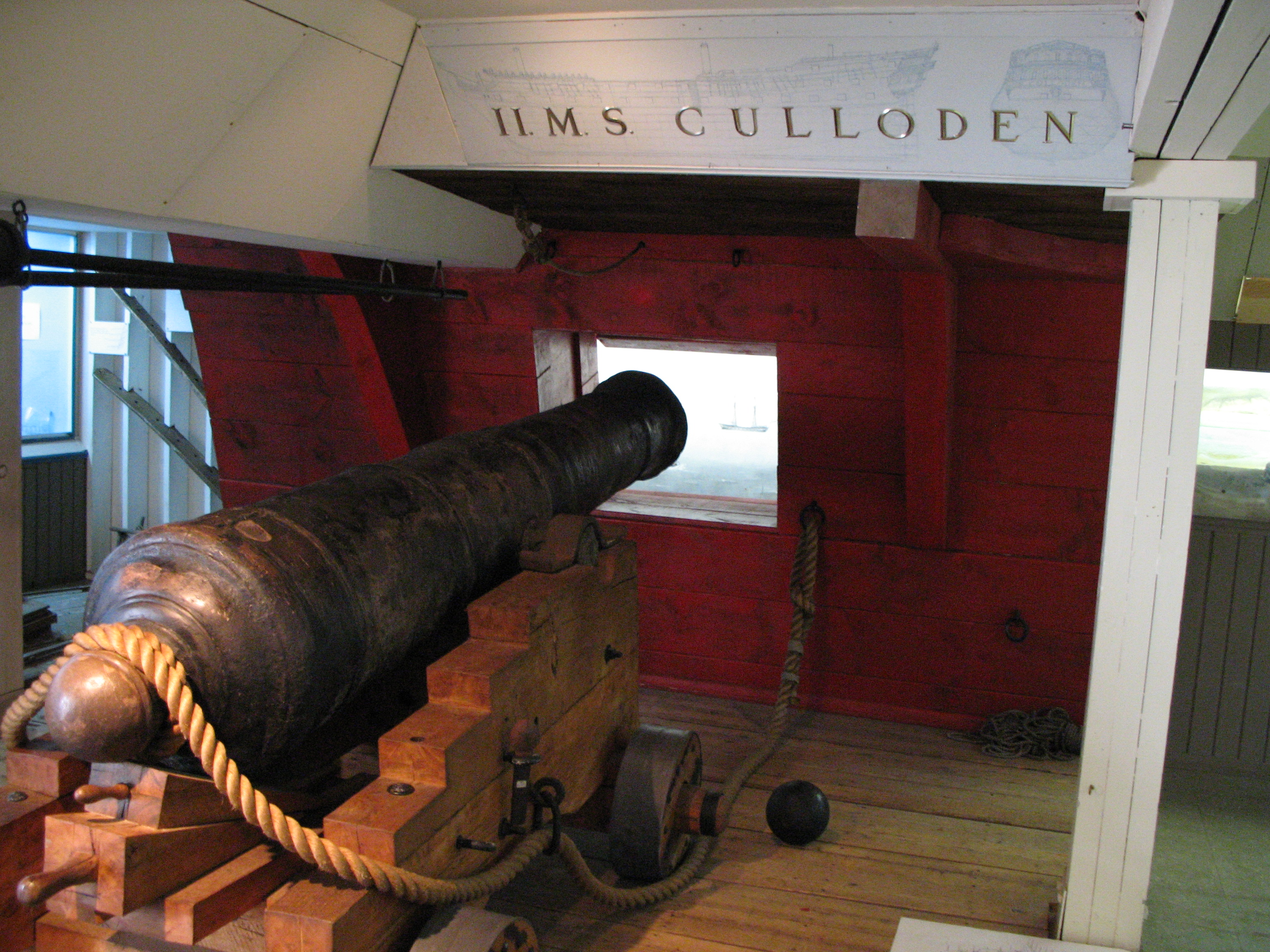
Cannon retrieved from the Culloden on display at the Marine Museum

In 1775 the British first ventured toward Long Island at Fort Pond Bay at Montauk during the Siege of Boston. John Dayton, who had limited troops at his disposal, feigned that he had more by walking them back and forth across a hill turning their coats inside out to make it look like there more of them (a tactic referred to as Dayton's Ruse). The British would not formally attack Long Island until 1776.

After the fall of Long Island during the Battle of Long Island, the East Hampton ports of Northwest and Sag Harbor were blockaded by the British and the British used Gardiner's Island for a hunting preserve.

The first American victory in New York after the Battle of Long Island was Meigs Raid on Sag Harbor (sometimes called the Battle of Sag Harbor) when continentals from Connecticut raided the British earth works in the village and burned the ships and wharfs on the East Hampton side of the village. The Americans killed six and transported 90 British prisoners back to Connecticut without losing a single soldier.

A story often circulated is the story of Isaac Van Scoy who had a farm in Northwest. According to the tales the British raided his farmhouse and he killed one soldier with a pitchfork. Van Scoy was reported to have eventually been captured and taken to a prison ship in Sag Harbor where he escaped. The earthen remains of Van Scoy's house are still visible in the Northwest Preserve where he is buried (American flags mark his grave on holidays). His name is applied to various placenames in the area including Van Scoy Pond.

The manor house on Gardiners Island had just been built in 1774 and members of the British forces were to use it throughout the war – with or without permission. Among the British guests were Henry Clinton and John André. At one point Major Andre and Gardiner son Nathaniel Gardiner, who was a surgeon for the New Hampshire Continental Infantry, exchanged toasts on the island. Gardiner would later be the American surgeon who attended to Andre when he was executed after being caught spying with Benedict Arnold.

The British fleet used East Hampton waters for blockading Connecticut and planning for a new offense to retake New England (that never took place). One of the ships, HMS Culloden, ran aground at what is now called Culloden Point in Montauk during a winter storm on January 24, 1781. The ship was scuttled and burned. In the 1970s remains of the ship were discovered and is now Long Island's only underwater park. Remains of the ship can be seen at the East Hampton Marine Museum in Amagansett.

After the war, Gardiners Island which had been considered an independent colony was officially added to New York and East Hampton.

George Washington was to authorize construction of the Montauk Point Lighthouse.

==== War of 1812 ====
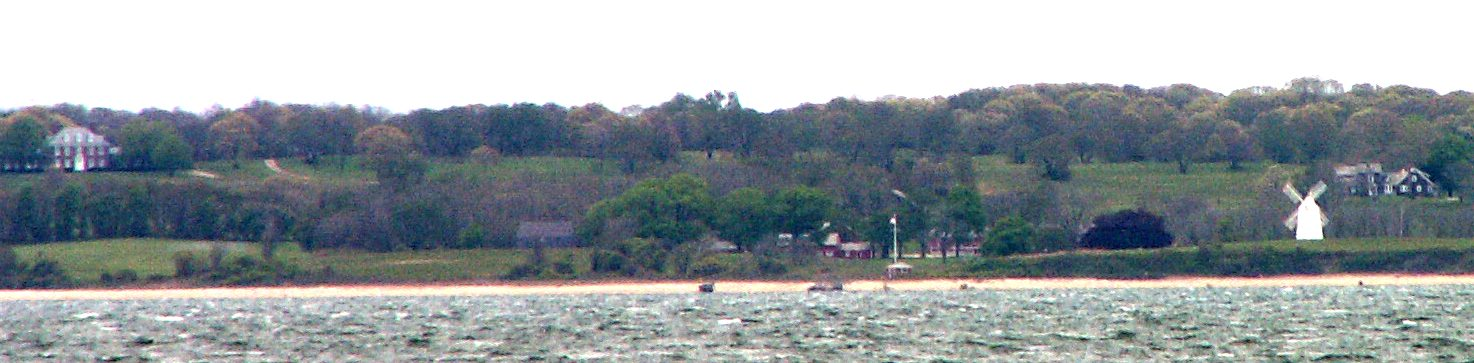
Gardiners Island from Springs, New York showing the white windmill (r) and family home (upper left)

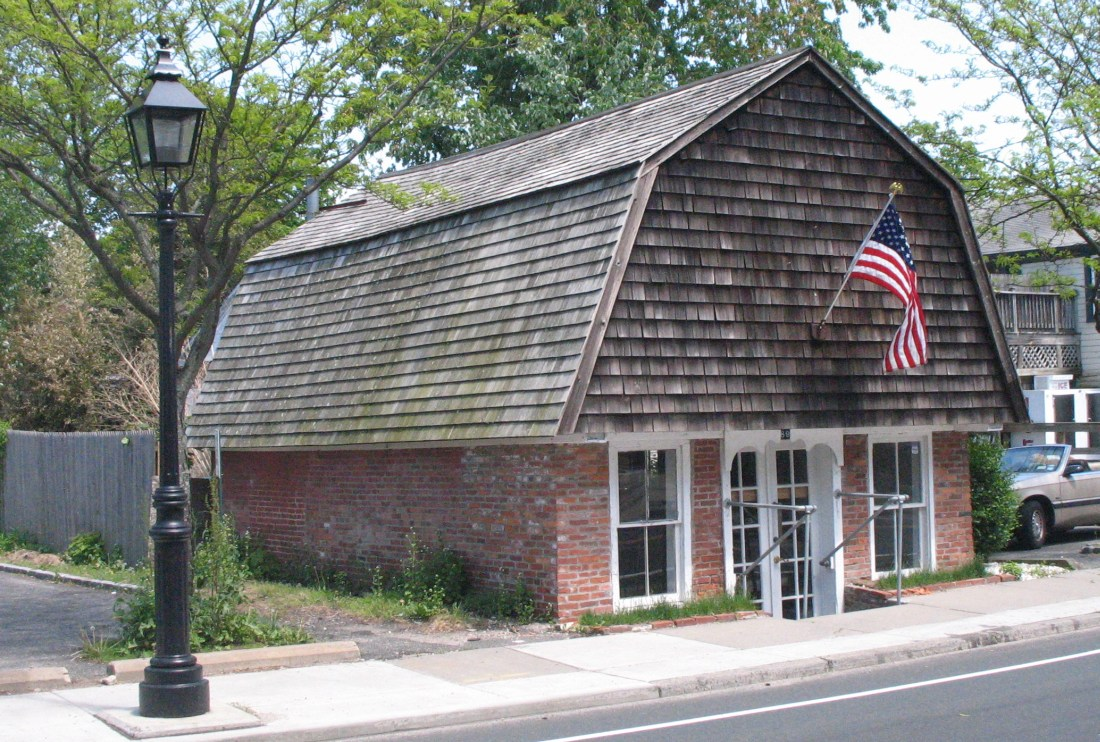
Umbrella House, oldest house in Sag Harbor. It housed British troops in the American Revolution and was hit by cannon fire during the War of 1812 (where light colored bricks are in lower left corner)

During the War of 1812 British frigates once again controlled the northern bays of East Hampton with frigates headquartered in Gardiners Bay particularly harassing ships going into Sag Harbor.

Sag Harbor had a fort manned by 3,000 troops on Turkey Hill. July 11, 1813, One hundred British Marines raided the wharf but were driven back after setting fire to one sloop by Americans led by Capt. David Hand.

During the War of 1812 a British fleet of seven ships of the line and several smaller frigates anchored in Cherry Harbor and conducted raids on American shipping Long Island Sound. Crews would come ashore for provisions which were purchased at market prices. During one of the British excursions, Americans captured some of the crew. The British came to arrest then Lord of the Manor John Lyon Gardiner. Gardiner, who was a delicate man, adopted the "green room defense" where he stayed in a bed with green curtains surrounded by medicine to make him look feeble. The British, not wanting a sick man on board, let him be.

The British were to bury several personnel on the island. Some of the British fleet that burned Washington assembled in the harbor in 1814.

Gardiner's supply boats were manned by slaves during the war and this made it easier for them to pass through British lines. Many of the Gardiner slaves were to live in the Freetown (East Hampton), just north of East Hampton (village), New York.

==== American Civil War ====
During the American Civil War, some of the Sag Harbor whaling ships were scuttled in Charleston, South Carolina harbor to blockade the city.

The USS Montauk, a monitor which was constructed at the Continental Iron Works in Greenpoint, Brooklyn, saw considerable action throughout the war. In 1865 the ship, docked at the Washington Navy Yard, was used as the prison for accused Abraham Lincoln assassination conspirators and the autopsy and identification of the body of assassin John Wilkes Booth.

==== Spanish–American War ====
During the Spanish–American War, the Army built Fort Tyler on Gardiners Point Island in an attempt to protect Long Island.

A more important fort was the massive Camp Wickoff (also called Wyckoff) which stretched from the current Montauk Long Island Railroad station to the Montauk Point Lighthouse.

The area was used to quarantine soldiers coming from the conflict. The most prominent group among the 20,000 soldiers who passed through the base were Theodore Roosevelt and his Rough Riders. The tented camp became a national scandal over the poor treatment of troops (256 died there) and President William McKinley visited to emphasize improvements. Exhibits and artifacts from the camp are at Theodore Roosevelt County Park.

==== World War I ====
During World War I, the E.W. Bliss Company of Brooklyn, New York tested torpedoes in the harbor, a half mile north of Sag Harbor. As part of the process, Long Wharf in Sag Harbor was reinforced with concrete and rail spurs built along the wharf as the torpedoes were loaded onto ships for testing. They were shipped via the Long Island Road, along the Sag Harbor to the wharf which was owned by the railroad at the time. Among those observing the tests was Thomas Alva Edison. Most of the today's buildings on the wharf, including the Bay Street Theatre, were built during this time. The torpedoes, which did not have exploding warheads, are occasionally found by divers on the bay floor.

==== World War II ====
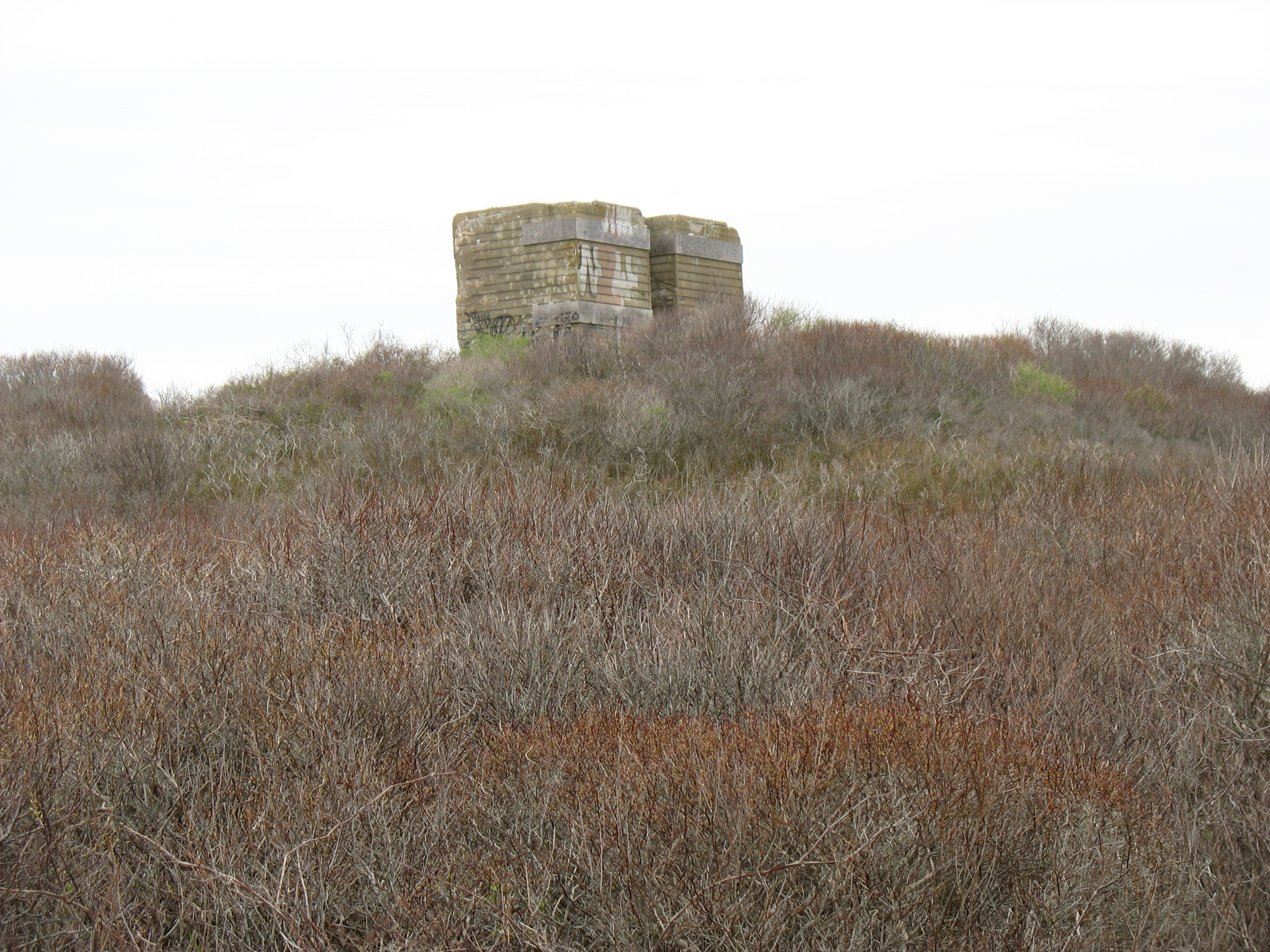
Observation bunker rising above the shadbush at Shadmoor State Park

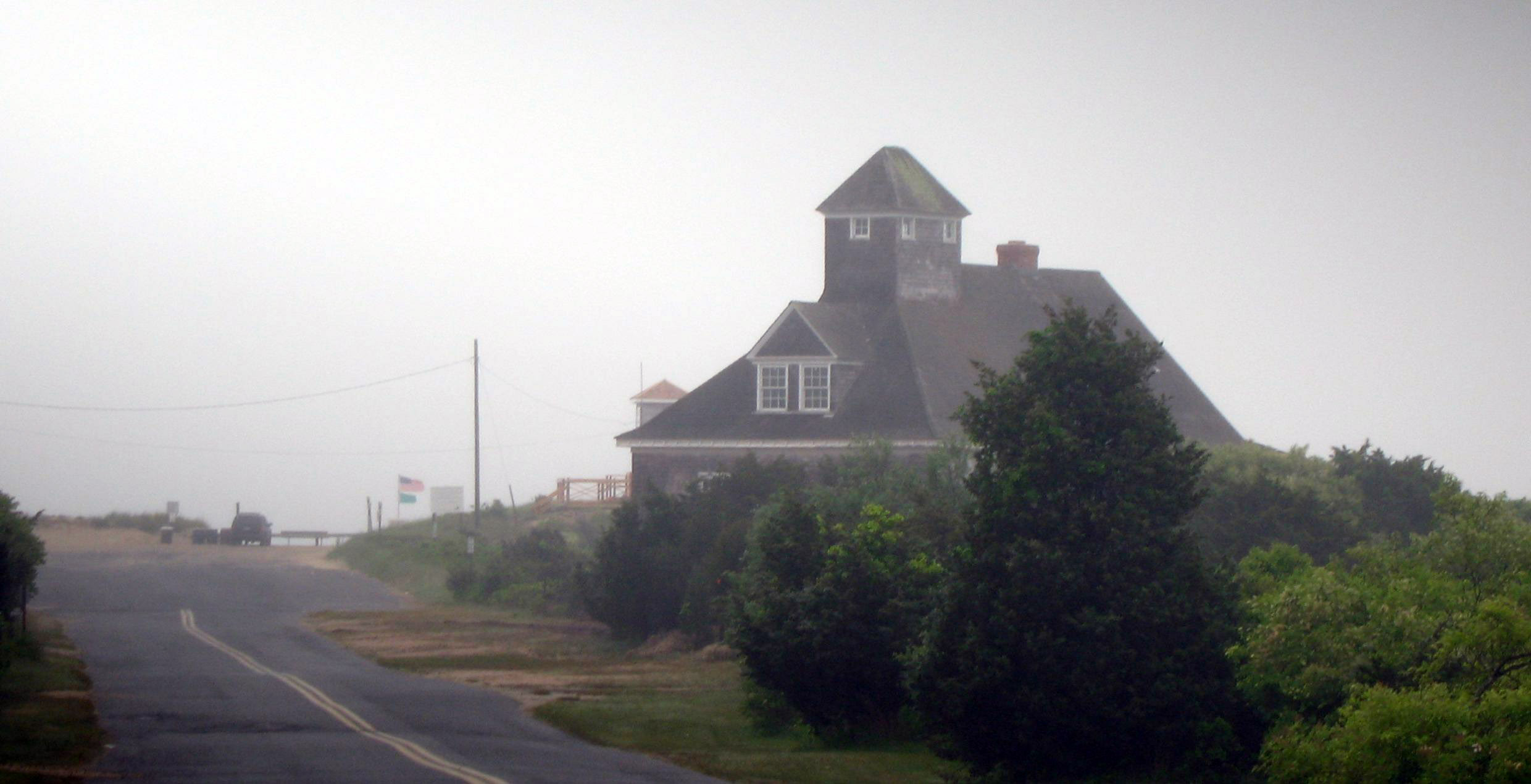
Coast Guard station at Amagansett where Germans came ashore

During World War II, coastal fortifications were set up along the eastern tip of Long Island at Montauk. A concrete observation tower as built next to the Montauk Lighthouse. 16 inch naval guns were placed in adjacent bunkers at Camp Hero. The observation tower is still next to the lighthouse and the additional bunkers are visible at Camp Hero State Park as well as Shadmoor State Park.

On June 13, 1942, as part of Operation Pastorius four German agents led by George John Dasch were landed by U202 at what is now Atlantic Avenue Beach (sometimes called Coast Guard Beach) in Amagansett. Confronted by Coast Guardsman John C. Cullen, they said they were Southampton fishermen. When one of the four said something in a foreign tongue, they offered him $300 to keep quiet. The agents disappeared into the night after he sought out his supervisor. When reinforcements arrived they discovered German cigarettes on the beach along with four heavy, waterproof oaken boxes buried in the sand filled with brick-sized blocks of high explosives, bombs disguised as lumps of coal, bomb-timing mechanisms of German make, and innocent-looking “pen-and-pencil sets” that were actually incendiary weapons.

The agents rode the Long Island Railroad into New York City and were ultimately captured along with four others who had come ashore at Jacksonville, Florida. Six of the agents were to be executed.

In May 2007 the original Coast Guard station was moved to the property at the Town Marine Museum in Amagansett across the dunes from its original Atlantic Avenue beach location. The station was moved in 1966 to private property to save it from demolition by Joel Carmichael The Marine Museum itself was the former barracks for the Coast Guard.

The Navy appropriated almost all of Montauk during the war for facilities including Montauk Manor which was used as a dormitory. Torpedoes were tested in Lake Montauk. Ships and dirigibles docked on Navy Road on Fort Pond Bay. The Navy was to find Fort Pond inhospitable since it was shallow. Dredging was to contribute to problems with flooding. After the war the Navy moved the residential section of Montauk which had been on the bay by the Long Island Rail station a mile to the south to get away from the flooding. One of the biggest legacies of the Navy presence was to be the dredging of Lake Montauk so that it replaced Fort Pond as Montauk's dock. The Coast Guard is now headquartered there on Star Island.

==== Cold War ====
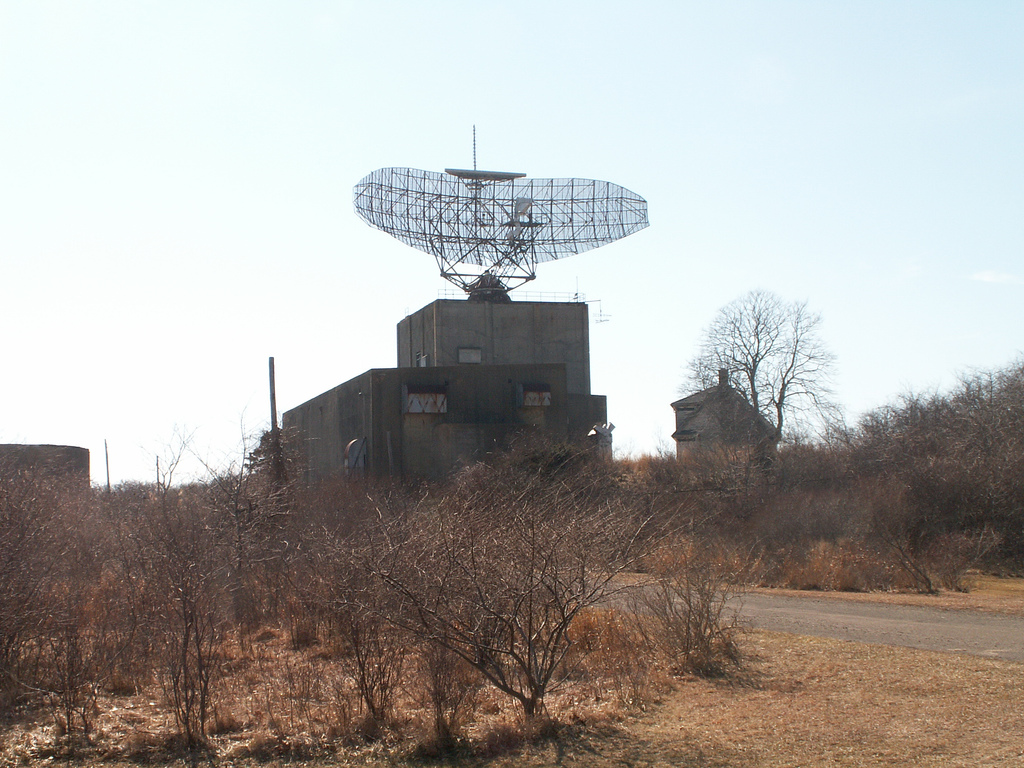
AN/FPS-35 radar

After the war, most of the military property was disposed of as surplus, except for gun emplacements at Camp Hero next to the Montauk Point Lighthouse. The camp was designated as an Air Force Base supporting a 135-foot (41 m)-wide radar (AN/FPS-35) in the early 1960s to detect potential bombers headed for New York City. The massive radar and supporting state-of-the-art computers quickly became obsolete. While the other radars in this category were torn down, the one on Montauk, was saved largely because it served as a better landmark than did the lighthouse for sailors and ships on Long Island Sound. The base was officially decommissioned in the 1980s. The support buildings now form a ghost town. The radar structure has been listed on the National Register of Historic Places.

In 1992, Long Island residents Preston B. Nichols and Peter Moon published a science fiction book, The Montauk Project: Experiments in Time. They suggested that the radar was used by the government to conduct time travel experiments. Some readers believe their sci-fi account is true. The base has become of cult interest among conspiracy buffs. It was featured in a segment of The X-Files.

== Geography ==
East Hampton is bounded by Southampton to the west, the Atlantic Ocean to the south, Block Island Sound to the east, and Napeague Bay to the north.

According to the United States Census Bureau, the town has a total area of 386.6 square miles (1,001 km^{2}), of which 74.4 square miles (193 km^{2}) is land and 312.2 square miles (809 km^{2}) (80.76%) is water.

== Climate ==
East Hampton has an Oceanic climate (Köppen Cfb). East Hampton has chilly, wet winters and very warm, dry summers due to the moderating influence of the ocean, which suppresses thunderstorm development and moderates summer temperatures. Summers have very warm, sunny, and stable weather, whereas the winters are often stormy due to coastal storms which bring rain but little snow. The region averages only about 10 inches or 0.25 metres of snow annually.

Climate data for East Hampton
Month	Jan	Feb	Mar	Apr	May	Jun	Jul	Aug	Sep	Oct	Nov	Dec	Year
Record high °F (°C)	57 (14)	59 (15)	70 (21)	84 (29)	86 (30)	97 (36)	95 (35)	97 (36)	91 (33)	81 (27)	72 (22)	63 (17)	97 (36)
Mean daily maximum °F (°C)	37 (3)	41 (5)	45 (7)	55 (13)	64 (18)	73 (23)	79 (26)	77 (25)	72 (22)	63 (17)	52 (11)	41 (5)	59 (15)
Mean daily minimum °F (°C)	23 (−5)	25 (−4)	30 (−1)	41 (5)	48 (9)	57 (14)	64 (18)	63 (17)	57 (14)	46 (8)	37 (3)	27 (−3)	43 (6)
Record low °F (°C)	0 (−18)	−2 (−19)	10 (−12)	16 (−9)	34 (1)	36 (2)	46 (8)	50 (10)	39 (4)	19 (−7)	18 (−8)	1 (−17)	−2 (−19)
Average rainfall inches (mm)	2.8 (71)	3.1 (79)	3.5 (89)	4.0 (102)	3.1 (79)	2.1 (53)	1.3 (33)	1.2 (30)	2.1 (53)	2.9 (74)	5.4 (137)	2.6 (66)	34.1 (866)
Source: Weatherbase

== Government ==
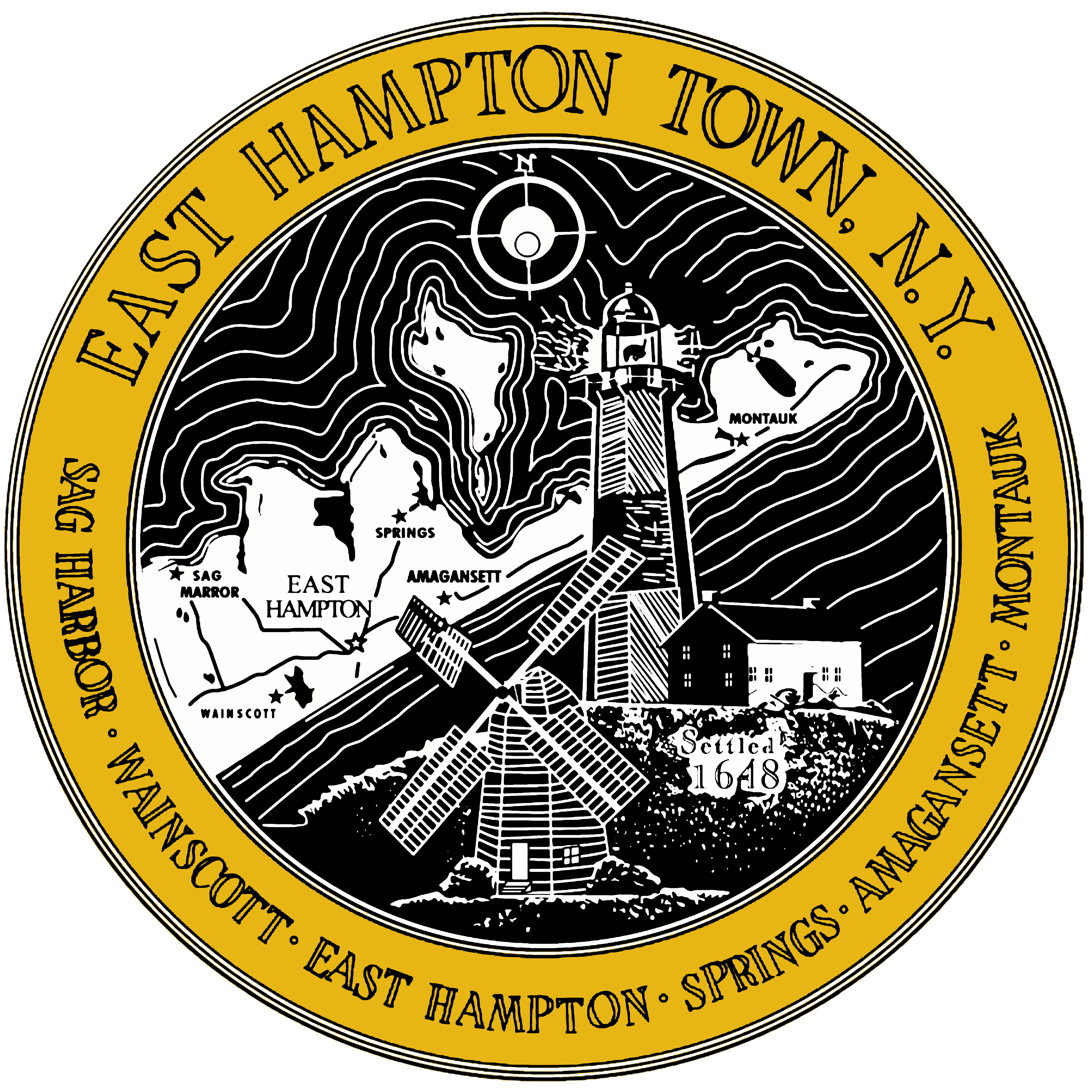
East Hampton town seal

The town has two governments, which sometimes are in conflict. The most visible town government is the elected Town Board, which consists of five people, including its head, the Town Supervisor. They are responsible for managing the taxes, roads, police, parks, zoning and general governance of the town. The Town Board was stablished by the State of New York in 1788. The government operates from a 13-acre (53,000 m^{2}) campus on Pantigo Road.

The historic, original Town government is known as the Trustees of the Freeholders and Commonalty of the Town of East Hampton. Today it is formally responsible for day-to-day decisions related to common property in the town. The Trustees derive their power from the Dongan Patent of December 9, 1686, which set up self-governance for the town. The patent (a land grant) establishing the trustees was an act by Thomas Dongan, the Royal Governor of New York. Among the common properties which the trustees operate is Georgica Pond; they decide when the tidal pond is to be drained and filled. These actions often make headlines as they sometimes cause the flooding of basements of neighboring properties owned by celebrities. In 1998, the pond was drained a few days before President Bill Clinton was to spend his summer vacation at the home of Steven Spielberg.

Since the late 20th century, the Town has often approved progressive social initiatives, including domestic partnership registration. In 1999, it imposed a 2 percent tax on residential real estate sales in excess of $250,000 for the purpose of buying open space for preservation. The money has been used in part to the Town's establishing more than 200 miles (320 km) of trails, including the Paumanok Path. Between 2002 and 2005, the tax raised $71 million. In 2006, the Town adopted a dark skies ordinance, which is now being considered as a model for wider use in New York State to cut down on light pollution at night.

Despite East Hampton's great wealth, its fire department and ambulance are both volunteer services, dependent on local full-time residents. In August 1998, President Bill Clinton was to give his weekend radio address from the Amagansett Volunteer Fire Station during his vacation.

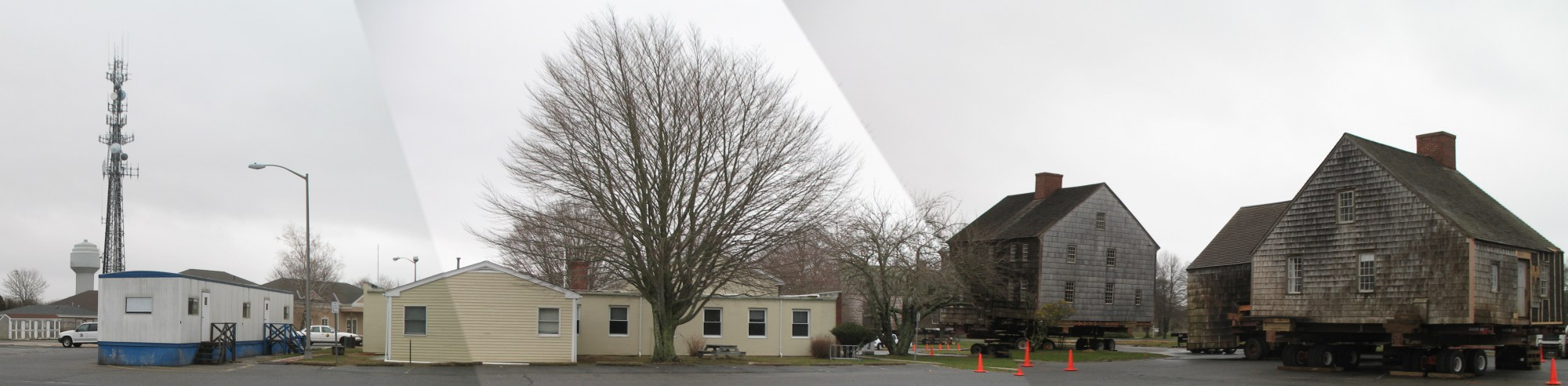
The East Hampton town government campus with its house trailers on the left and the 19th- and 18th-century houses moved to the 10 acre campus for a "new" town hall in April 2007.

Although residences in the town are often featured in architectural magazines, the town offices have been housed for years in several double wide trailers on a lot, hidden from the street by a nondescript flat-roofed building. In 2006, the Town announced plans to convert its campus by adapting a collection of historic East Hampton buildings that had been moved over the course of 30 years to the 40-acre (160,000 m^{2}) Further Lane home of Adelaide de Menil, heiress to the Schlumberger oil fortune. In 2006 it was announced that the new Town complex was to be designed by internationally known architect Robert A.M. Stern (who designed the East Hampton Library in 1997).

The transfer of the historic houses to the Town government site was part of the sale of the de Menil to financier Ron Baron for $103 million; in 2007 this was reported as the highest price ever paid for a single residence in United States history.

The township has aggressively pursued zoning ordinances to protect its residential and rural character. It has no chain fast food restaurants and or big box stores (unlike Southampton, which has numerous fast food chains and stores). The village of East Hampton formerly also exercised a "no chain" rule.

=== Police ===
East Hampton Town Police Department
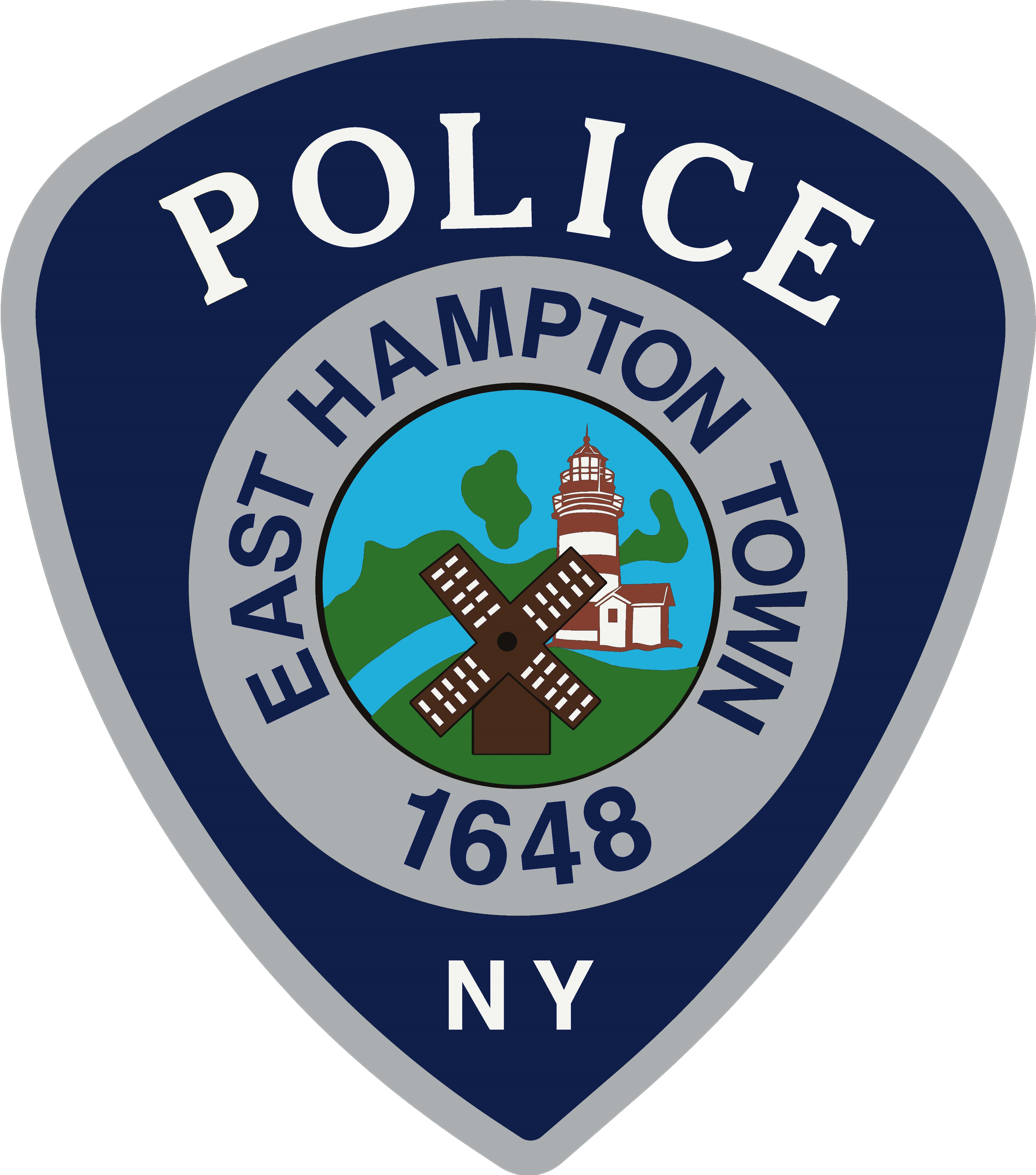
- Abbreviation: EHTPD

Agency overview
- Employees: 80

Jurisdictional structure
- Operations jurisdiction: East Hampton, New York, USA
- Area: 386 square miles (1,000 km^{2})
- Population: 32000 (2019)
- General nature: Civilian police

Operational structure
- Headquarters: Wainscott, New York
- Police Officers: 70
- Traffic Control Officers: 12
- Agency executive: Michael Sarlo, Chief

Website
- EHTPD Website

The East Hampton Town Police Department, commonly referred to as EHTPD, is a professional police organization responsible for primary jurisdictional law enforcement for the town. The headquarters are located at 131 Wainscott Northwest Road, Wainscott, NY 11975 (631) 537-7575. The East Hampton Town Police Department is headed by Chief Michael Sarlo

== Demographics ==
Historical population
Census	Pop.	Note	%±
1790	1,497		—
1800	1,549		3.5%
1810	1,484		−4.2%
1820	1,646		10.9%
1830	1,668		1.3%
1840	2,076		24.5%
1850	2,122		2.2%
1860	2,267		6.8%
1870	2,372		4.6%
1880	2,515		6.0%
1890	2,431		−3.3%
1900	3,746		54.1%
1910	4,722		26.1%
1920	4,852		2.8%
1930	6,569		35.4%
1940	6,529		−0.6%
1950	6,325		−3.1%
1960	8,827		39.6%
1970	10,980		24.4%
1980	14,029		27.8%
1990	16,132		15.0%
2000	19,718		22.2%
2010	21,457		8.8%
2020	28,385		32.3%
U.S. Decennial Census

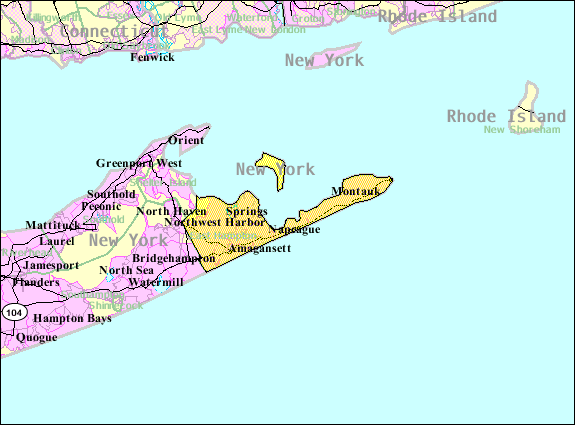
East Hampton town map from U.S. census

Demographics in East Hampton were skewed by the fact that more than half the houses were owned as second homes (among the owners were some of the wealthiest people in the country). The East Hampton economy was based on retail and services to support the residential community.

As of the census of 2010, there were 21,457 people and 21,038 households residing in East Hampton. The population density was 290.0 inhabitants per square mile (112.0/km^{2}). There were 2,251 housing units at an average density of 403.6 per square mile (155.8/km^{2}). The racial makeup of the town was 67.10% White (not Hispanic or Latino), 26.10% Hispanic or Latino of any race, 2.10% Black or African American, 0.30% Native American, 1.50% Asian, 0.07% Pacific Islander, 3.35% from other races, and 18.90% from two or more races.

As of the census of 2000, there were 1,445 households, out of which 27.3% had children under the age of 18 living with them, 44.2% were married couples living together, 12.2% had a female householder with no husband present, and 39.0% were non-families. 31.9% of all households were made up of individuals, and 16.8% had someone living alone who was 65 years of age or older. The average household size was 2.47 and the average family size was 3.07.

As of the census of 2010, in the town the population was spread out, with 19.9% under the age of 18, 2.2% from 18 to 20, 5.1% from 20 to 24, 11.3% from 25 to 34, 21.5% from 35 to 49, 22.5% from 50 to 64, and 17.6% who were 65 years of age or older. For every 100 females, there were 101.5 males.

As of the census of 2000, the median income for a household in the town was $52,201, and the median income for a family was $55,357. Males had a median income of $38,566 versus $29,750 for females. The per capita income for the CDP was $25,725. 12.2% of the population and 10.3% of families were below the poverty line. Out of the total population, 20.5% of those under the age of 18 and 4.2% of those 65 and older were living below the poverty line.

== Special events ==
One of the highlights of the summer is East Hampton Fire Department fireworks display at Main Beach, usually held the Saturday night closest to July 4. The fireworks displays have generated controversy since 2005, when they were postponed because they were considered disruptive to the nearby nesting of the endangered piping plover. In 2005, 2007, and 2008 the fireworks were postponed until Labor Day weekend to protect the birds' nesting season. The village administration has since postponed the fireworks display to Labor Day weekend indefinitely.

A big draw in the summer had also been the shark fishing tournaments in Montauk. Since 2007, the Humane Society and other animal welfare groups have protested that the tournaments are cruel to the sharks, as they are not being caught for food.

Each summer, the Artists and Writers Softball Game, a charity benefit, is held. Past players have included John Irving, Norman Mailer, Kurt Vonnegut, Dustin Hoffman, President Bill Clinton, and singer Paul Simon.

Every October the town hosts the Hamptons International Film Festival, an event screening independent films in several local theaters. It has a fairly large draw from the New York City crowd.

Barefoot Contessa, a Food Network original show, is shot in East Hampton.

== Communities and locations ==
=== Villages (incorporated) ===
- East Hampton
- Sag Harbor, (west of Division Street is in the Town of Southampton)

=== Hamlets (unincorporated) ===
- Amagansett
- Montauk
- Napeague
- Springs
- Wainscott

Defunct hamlets include Apaquoga, Barnes Hole, Devon, Divinity Hill, Eastside, and Fire Place.

=== Census-designated places ===
In addition to the above, the United States Census has two locations using terms that are usually used by residents of the town:

- East Hampton North – the area just north of the village, known locally as Freetown, as it was founded in the 19th century by free people of color, including some of Montaukett descent.
- Northwest Harbor – the area northwest of the village that is usually referred to locally as "Northwest" or "Northwest Woods." It has a harbor.

=== State parks ===
- Amsterdam Beach State Park
- Camp Hero State Park
- Hither Hills State Park
- Montauk Downs State Park
- Montauk Point State Park
- Napeague State Park
- Sag Harbor State Golf Course
- Shadmoor State Park

=== Suffolk County parks ===
- Cedar Point County Park
- Theodore Roosevelt County Park

== Education ==
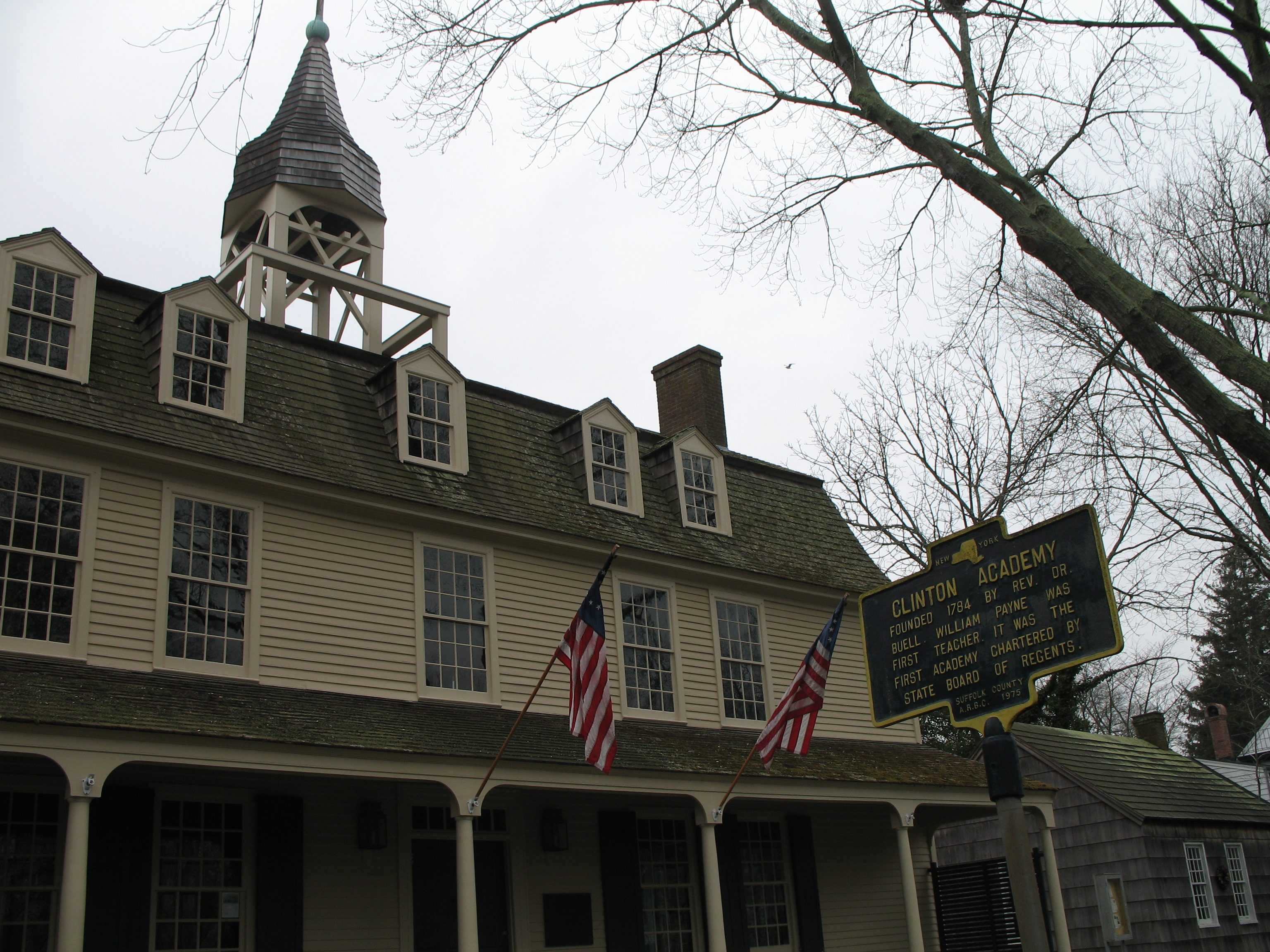
Clinton Academy

East Hampton does not have any colleges. The now disbanded Clinton Academy on Main Street was the first chartered Academy authorized by the New York State Board of Regents in 1784. Three high schools are in the Town:

- East Hampton High School, part of the East Hampton Union Free School District, and the principal school for the entire town outside of Sag Harbor. There were 920 enrolled students in grades 9-12 for the 2019–2020 school year. Its mascot is the Bonackers, which derives its name from Accabonac Harbor in the nearby Springs.
- Pierson Middle-High School, part of the Sag Harbor Union Free School District, is physically in East Hampton and serves Sag Harbor (which is partially within the town of Southampton). There were 535 enrolled students in grades 6-12 for the 2019–2020 school year. Its mascot is the Whalers.
- Ross School – The largest private school on the East End, the Ross School educates students from pre-school through 12th grade.

American educator Catharine Beecher was born in East Hampton.

== Television stations in East Hampton ==
- WVVH-CD Hamptons TV, UHF Channel 50, the largest FCC licensed TV station in Suffolk County. It broadcasts from the East Hampton Airport industrial park in Wainscott.
- Local-access television broadcasts the two public access channels in East Hampton town, Ch 20 public access, and Ch 22 government and education. They are located at the LTV Studios in Wainscott.

== Radio stations in East Hampton ==
East Hampton

- WEHM 96.9 FM

Montauk

- WELJ 104.7 FM
- WEER 88.7 FM
- WEGB 90.7 FM
- WJJF 94.9 FM
- WBLQ 1230 AM

== Transportation ==
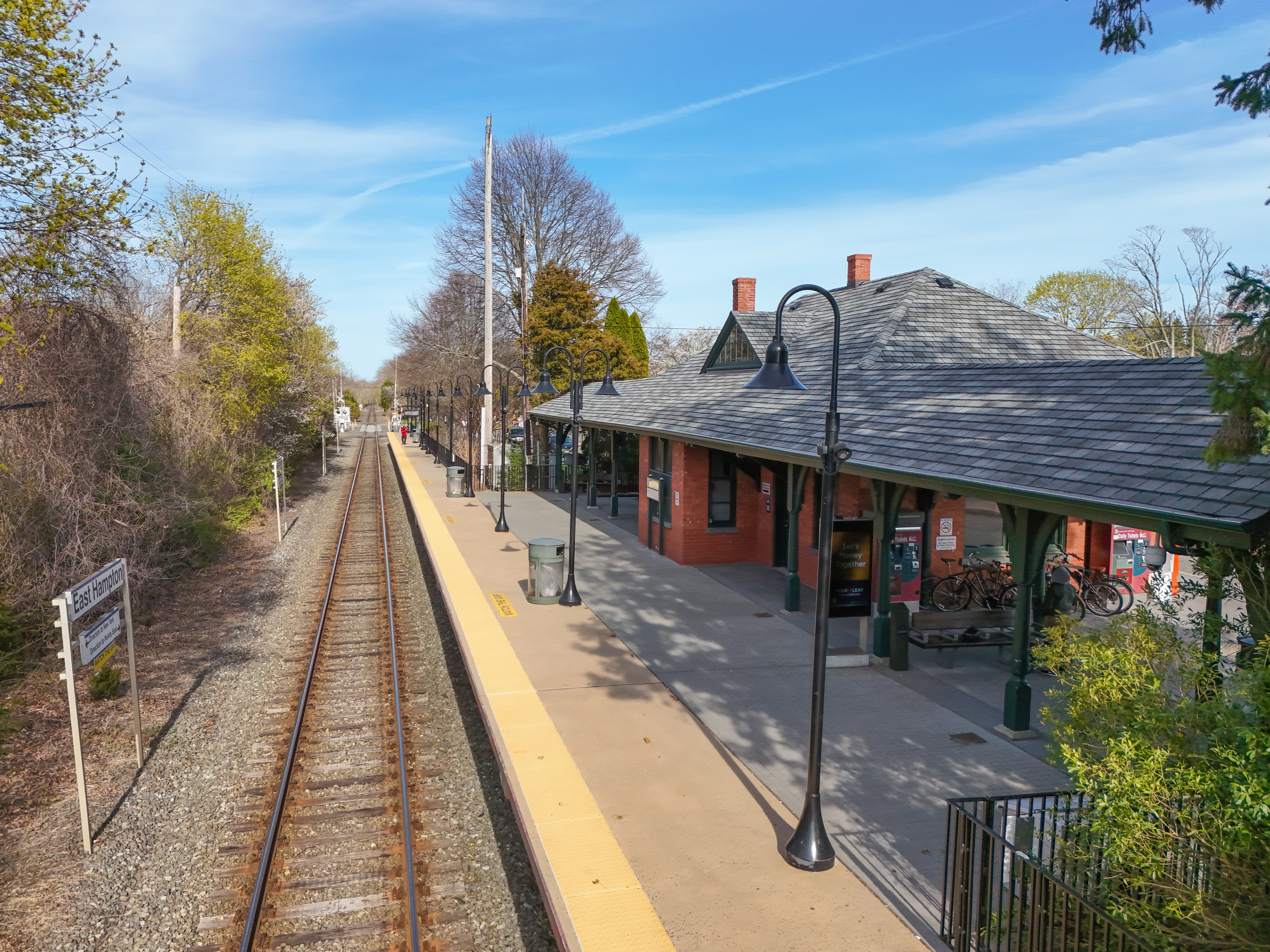
East Hampton station on the Long Island Rail Road

=== Railroad lines ===
The Long Island Rail Road's sole line in the Town of East Hampton is the Montauk Branch, which includes stations in East Hampton, Amagansett, and Montauk.

=== Bus service ===
The Town of East Hampton is served primarily by Suffolk County Transit bus routes, although Hampton Jitney buses are available for trips to New York City.

=== Major roads ===
- New York State Route 27
- New York State Route 114
- County Route 38
- County Route 79
- County Route 113

=== Airports ===
The town of East Hampton contains the East Hampton Airport along the Southampton-East Hampton town line, and Montauk Airport on the northeastern corner of Lake Montauk.

=== Ferries ===
The sole ferry in the Town of East Hampton is a passenger ferry taking people across the Block Island Sound between Montauk Harbor and either Block Island, New London, or Oak Bluffs on Martha's Vineyard.

== See also ==
- National Register of Historic Places listings in East Hampton (town), New York
- South Fork Wind Farm
