= Sag Harbor Hills, Azurest, and Ninevah Beach Subdivisions Historic District =

Historic district in New York, United States

- U.S. National Register of Historic Places
- U.S. Historic district
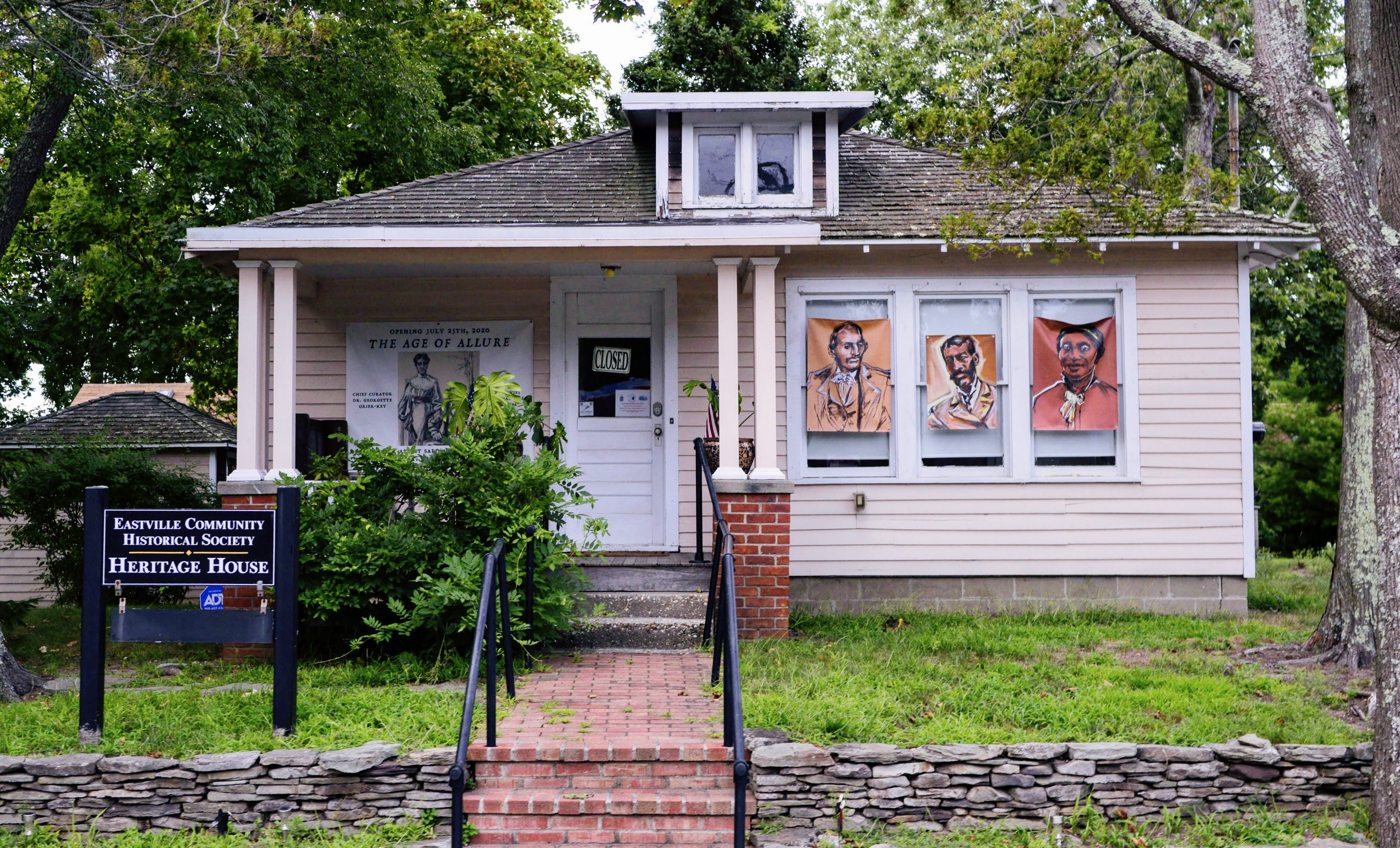
- HBBC Heritage House, September 2020

- Location within New York Location within the United States
- Location: Roughly bounded by Hempstead St., Richards Dr., Hampton St., Lincoln St., Harding Terr., Terry Dr. & the eastern end of Haven's Beach, Sag Harbor, New York
- Coordinates: 40°59′50″N 72°16′30″W
- Architects: Amaza Lee Meredith; unknowns
- NRHP reference No.: 100004217
- Added to NRHP: July 10, 2019

Sag Harbor Hills, Azurest, and Ninevah Beach Subdivisions Historic District (SANS), a new name, is for an African American beachfront community in Sag Harbor, New York. Founded following World War II, now referred to as Historically Black Beachfront Communities (HBBC), served primarily as a summer retreat for middle-class African American families during the post-WWII and Jim Crow era. African American families were not allowed at many beachfront resorts, pools or beaches, and HBBC's began as a place of refuge from racial strife. They were allowed at "Jones Beach". The no called SANS historic district is bordered by Hempstead Street, Richards Drive, Hampton Street, Lincoln Street, Harding Terrace, Terry Drive and the eastern end of Haven's Beach in Sag Harbor. It was placed on the National Register of Historic Places on July 10, 2019.

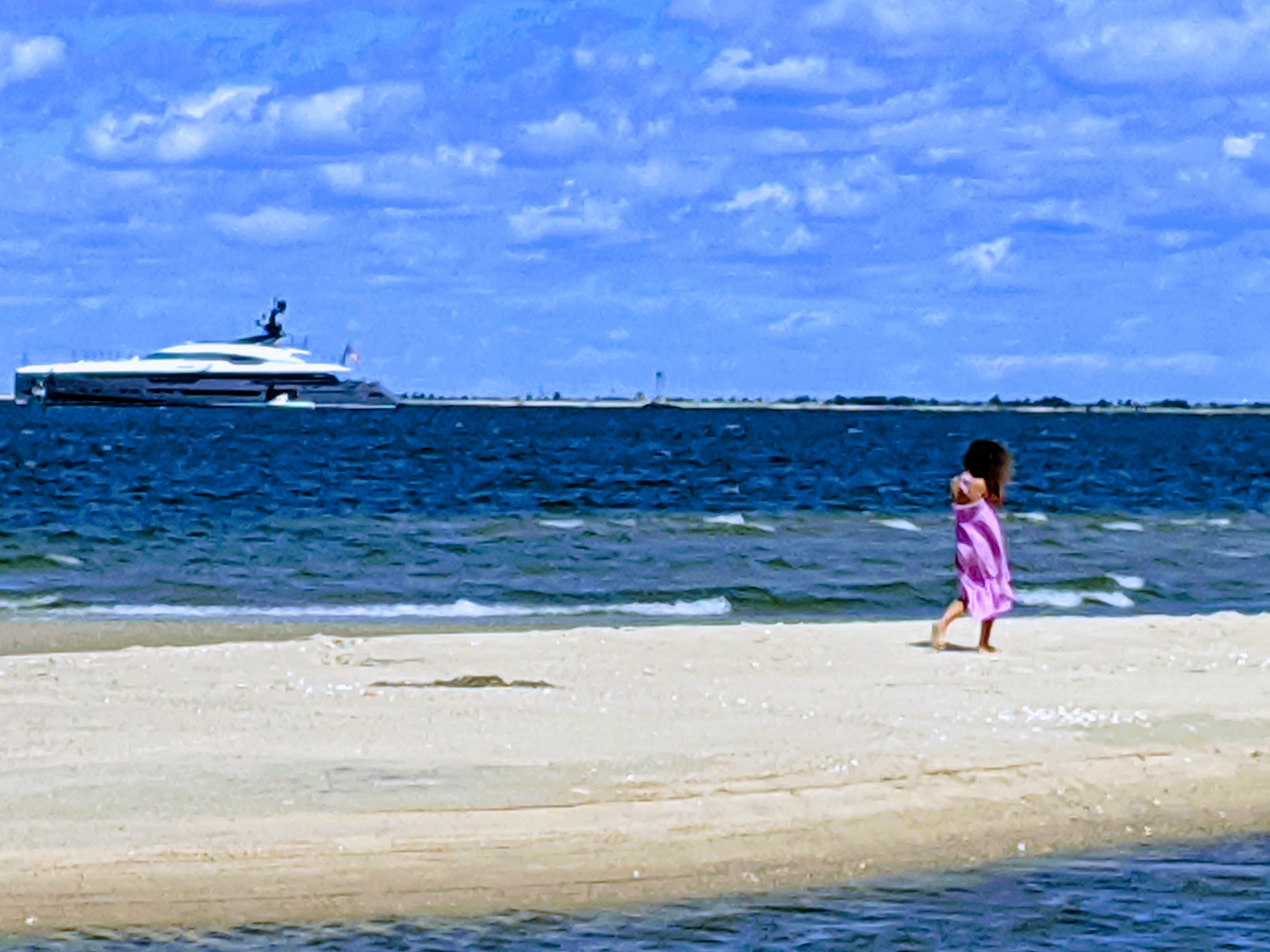
Ninevah Beach

== Early history ==
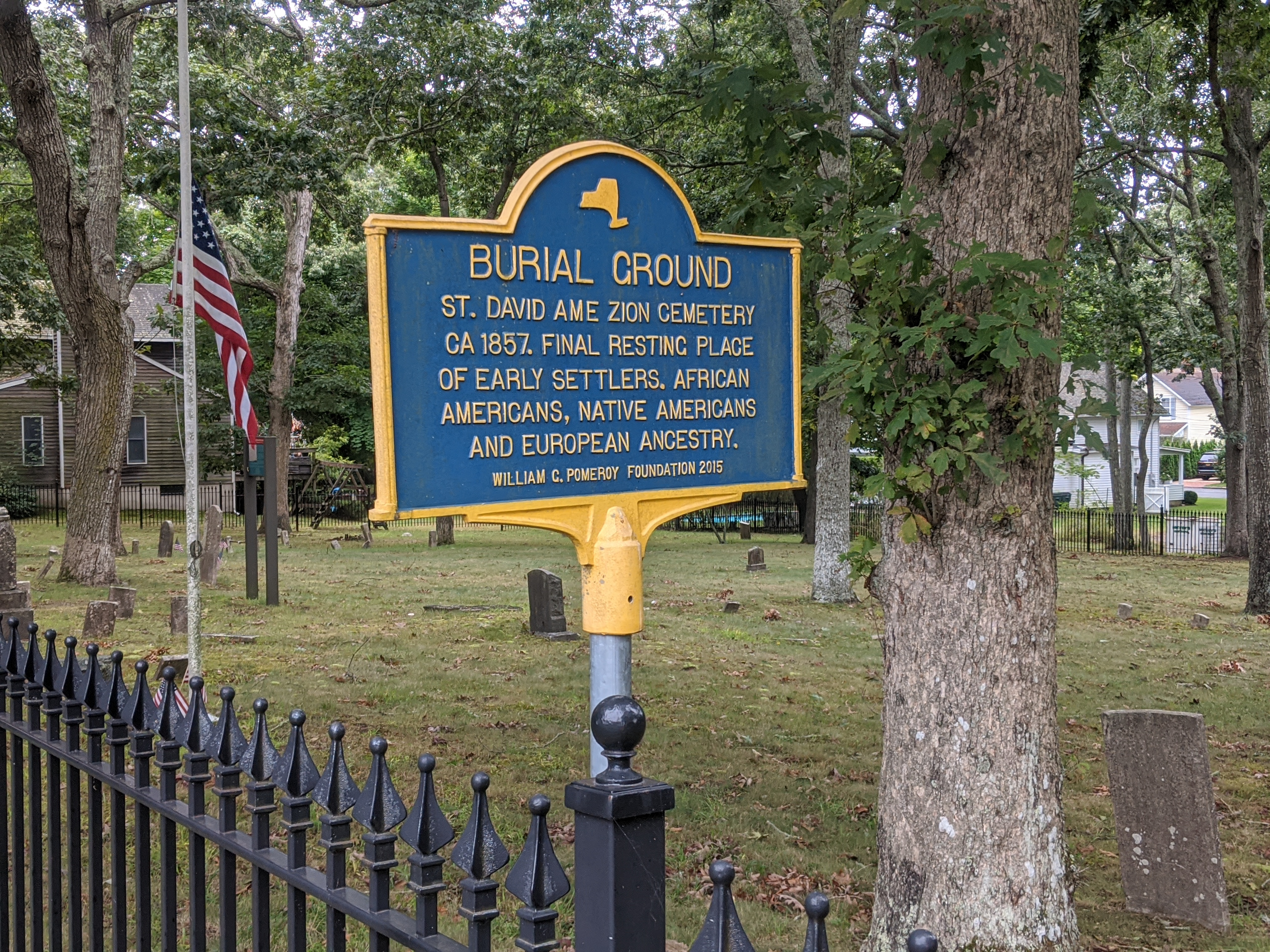
St. David AME Zion Cemetery

During colonial times, the northwest of East Hampton village was the free black and Native Americans' enclave along the Indian path to Sag Harbor. When Sag Harbor became the first U.S. port of entry after Northwest Harbor in 1789, the Black and Native populations were relegated to Eastville, southeast of the town. In 1839, due to a growing reluctance to allow blacks in the other churches' burying grounds, the African Methodist Episcopal (AME) Church of Eastville broke ground on a church and cemetery on Eastville Avenue on the southern side of Hampton Street. Reverend J. P. Thompson, the first pastor, is buried in the St David African Methodist Episcopal Zion Cemetery. It accommodated Irish Catholic immigrants, Montauketts and African Americans.

The Indian path was paved (NY 114), and in 1945 the road was widened, becoming the main road between the two communities. The AME church was the spiritual anchor of Eastville. (Eastville was listed in 1994 on the National Register of Historic Places as part of Sag Harbor Village Historic District Boundary Increase, 1994.)

The first of the three subdivisions to be developed was Azurest, located to the east of the old Sag Harbor Village Historic District. African-American families began purchasing property for summer retreats during the late 1940s. While unable to get loans, they built summer cottages on large lots, alternating homesites with lots deliberately left empty. Lot buyers were doctors, business owners, lawyers, academics and artists. Many prominent blacks during the civil rights era bought lots.

Retired Virginia schoolteacher Maude K. Terry (1887–1968), living with her daughter and son-in law, Iris Terry Richards, M.D. and her husband Frederick Forrest Richards, M.D., had a dream of there being a private Negro community where Negroes would own resort beach front property. She discovered the 20-acre parcel owned by Elsie Gale lying undeveloped between Hampton Street and Barcelona Neck. It belonged to the Elsie Gale.

With the birth of the third child of Drs. Fred and Iris Richards, there was a need for assistance due to that child being born with Down's Syndrome and their need to attend to their growing medcal practice in Hempstead at 70 Grove Street. That was because the third child, a daughter, suffered with Down's Syndrome for which there was a need for specialized care. Understanding that need, Dr. Iris' mother, Maude Kenny Meredith Terry, retired from her school teaching in Virgina and moved to Hempstead to take on the tasks needed for the extra care required for the new child with Down's Syndrome. Sag Harbor came into view, for them, later because it was discovered by Dr. Fred and his friends who traveled to various places on Long Island to fish on the weekends.

Terry's sister, Amaza Lee Meredith (1895–1984), an architect and artist, made the plan to sub-divide the property and designed some of the homes built there. Members and descendants of the Richards family, Azurest's founders, still occupy two properties and remain active staple points within the community.

With growth during the 1950s and 1960s and the arrival of celebrities, as the guests of some of the home owners, such as Ralph Bunch, Lena Horne, Harry Belafonte, Herbie Hancock, then later the restaurateur B. Smith and Allan Houston of the New York Knicks. The community grew. Many liked to compare it to Oak Bluffs on Martha's Vineyard as a black vacation destination. However, it was different than Oak Bluffs because the beaches for AZUREST, Sag Harbor Hills and Ninevah Beach were all owned by those developments. In Oak Bluffs Negroes, then, were only able to use the "Vineyard Haven" beach that they nicknamed "The Inkwell." That, notwithstanding Massachusetts having a black U.S. Senator, Edward William Brooke III.

Over 300 Black families bought in the adjacent communities of Sag Harbor Hills and Ninevah Beach.

Three other nearby subdivisions, Lighthouse Lane, Hillside Terrace and Chatfield's Hill, also attracted black home buyers in the late 20th century. These were not included in the historic district designation because all contributing properties have to be at least 50 years old.

== Summers in the Historically Black Beachfront Communities ==
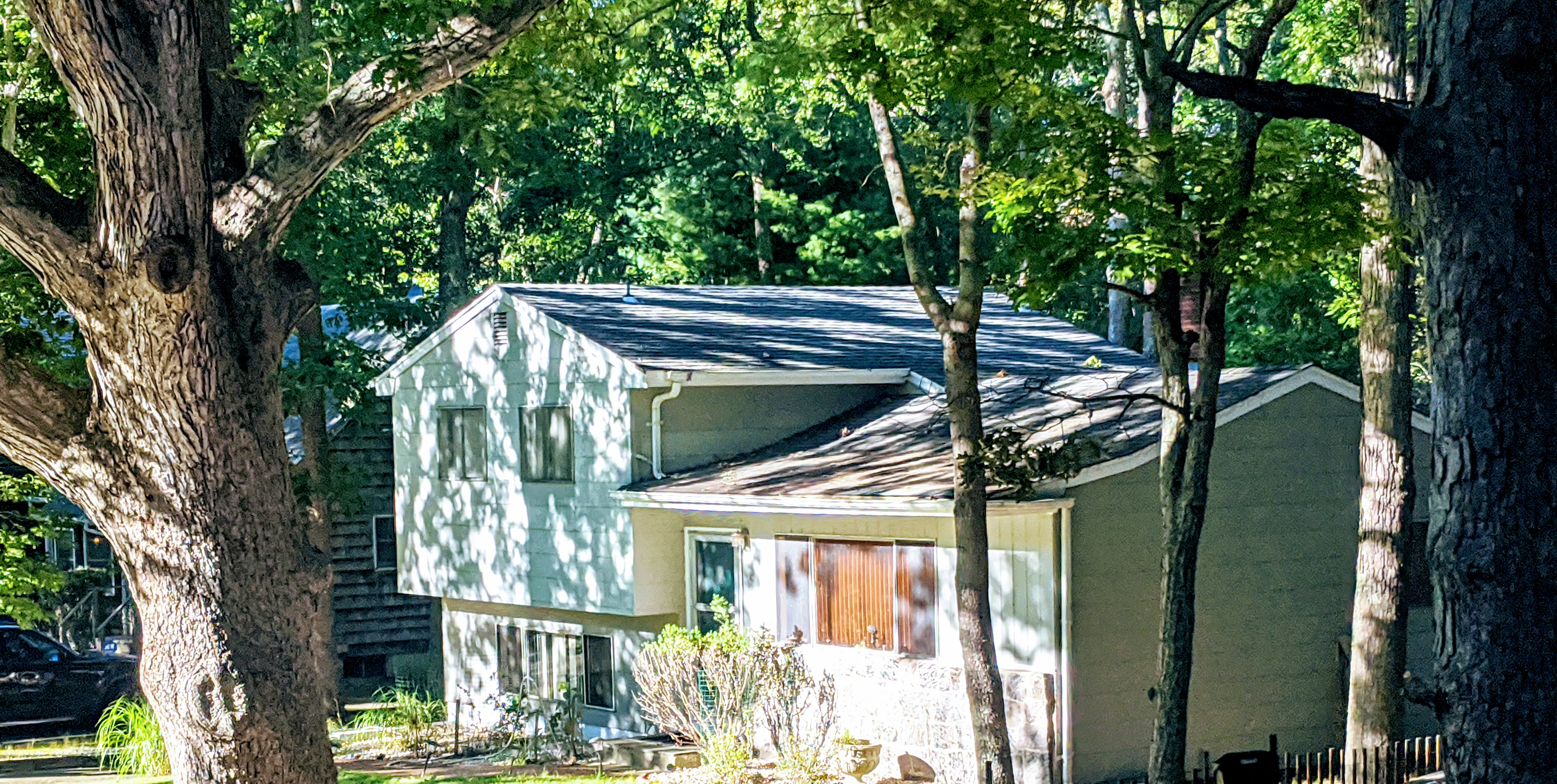
Ninevah Beach contributing property

Paul Ruffins, former editor of The Crisis magazine for the NAACP, wrote of spending summers at Ninevah Beach when growing up. Each summer, HBBC residents swelled to 1000, this at a time when Sag Harbor was not the trendy vacation spot it is today. The influx served to buoy the town financially when the Bulova watch factory and Grumman Aircraft plant closed. Ruffins remembers a time when a pair of sunglasses left on the beach was there the next day, walking in the woods of the nature preserve and meeting the other children of the founders. Jim Brannen, a NYFD firefighter and part-time contractor sold John L. Ruffins the lot that became the family retreat. He shared the cottage with Rey and Joan Ruffins, his brother and sister-in-law and their kids. Brennan sold many lots to fellow firefighters. Maude Terry sold many more to entrepreneurs and doctors, civil servants and teachers, the pre-WWII black elite, many of whom – just like their white counterparts – could afford a summer home on the beachfront; people like Earl Graves, the editor of Ebony and Jet magazine; and the owner of the popular J. Foster Phillips Funeral home in St. Albans. Artists built from plans found in Popular Mechanics magazine while camping out in the shell of their cottage. He describes a gentle beach, sloping out for 100 feet with little chop from Gardiner's Bay; a short walk along the shore thru Haven's beach to town for ice cream; sassafras, cedar and scrub oak; clean sand and sailboats anchored offshore; a six-mile bike ride to Sagaponack and the Atlantic's beaches. The trees growing from the sandy soil provided a cover that enabled the "Soul of Summer" to reach a generation of African-Americans. The golfers in these communities originally had no relaible non-discriminatory place to golf until Rockville Centre dentist, Harry Diner, whose son Danny befriended many of his age from these communities, put together a group that created the Noyac Golf and Country Club. The Negroes from AZUREST, Sag Harbor Hills, Ninevah Beach, and Lighthouse Lane were all invited to become members of the Noyac Golf and Country Club. Many joined and there were able to enjoy golf without the taint of racism.

== Gentrification ==
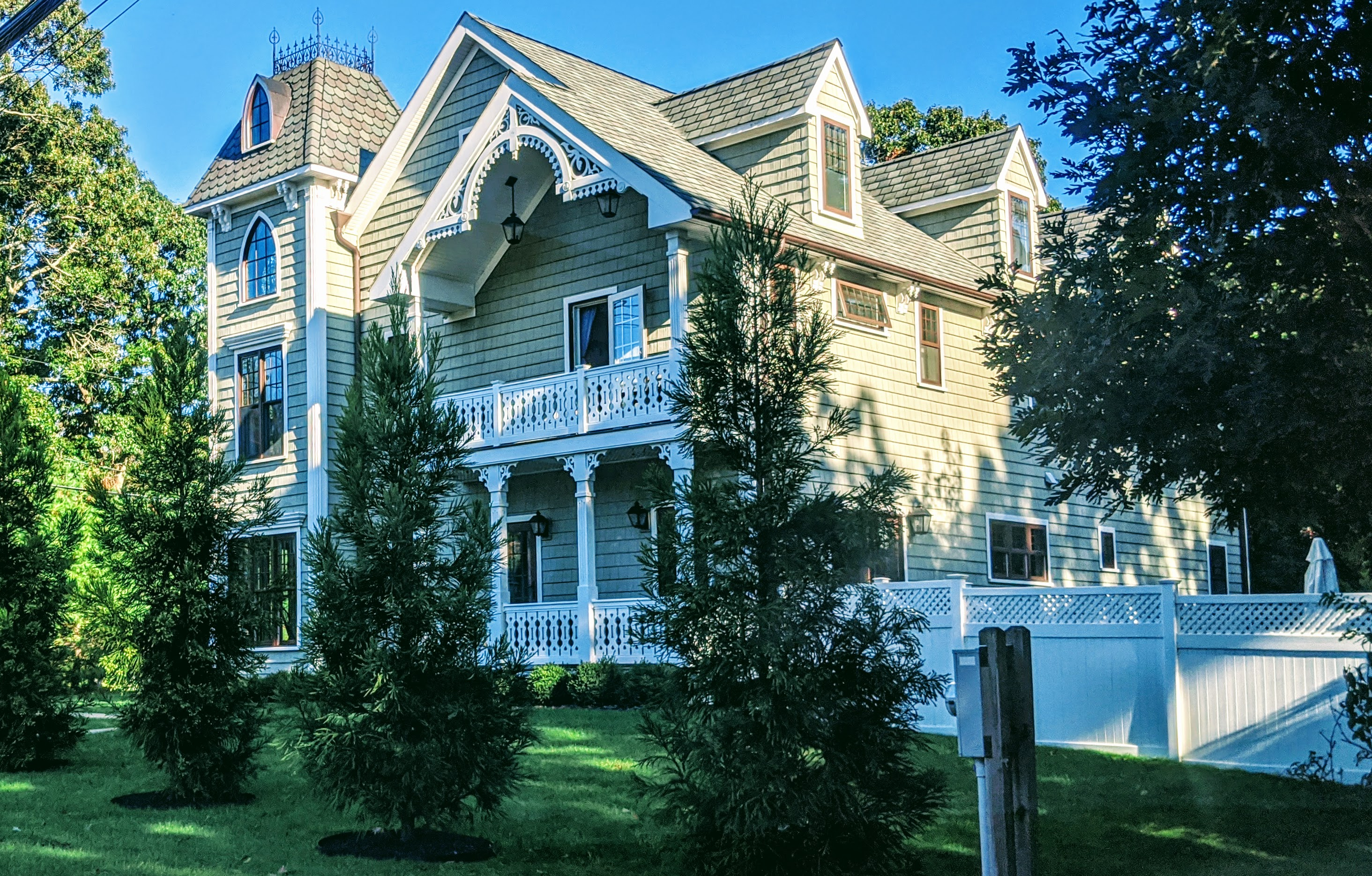
Home in Sag Harbor Hills

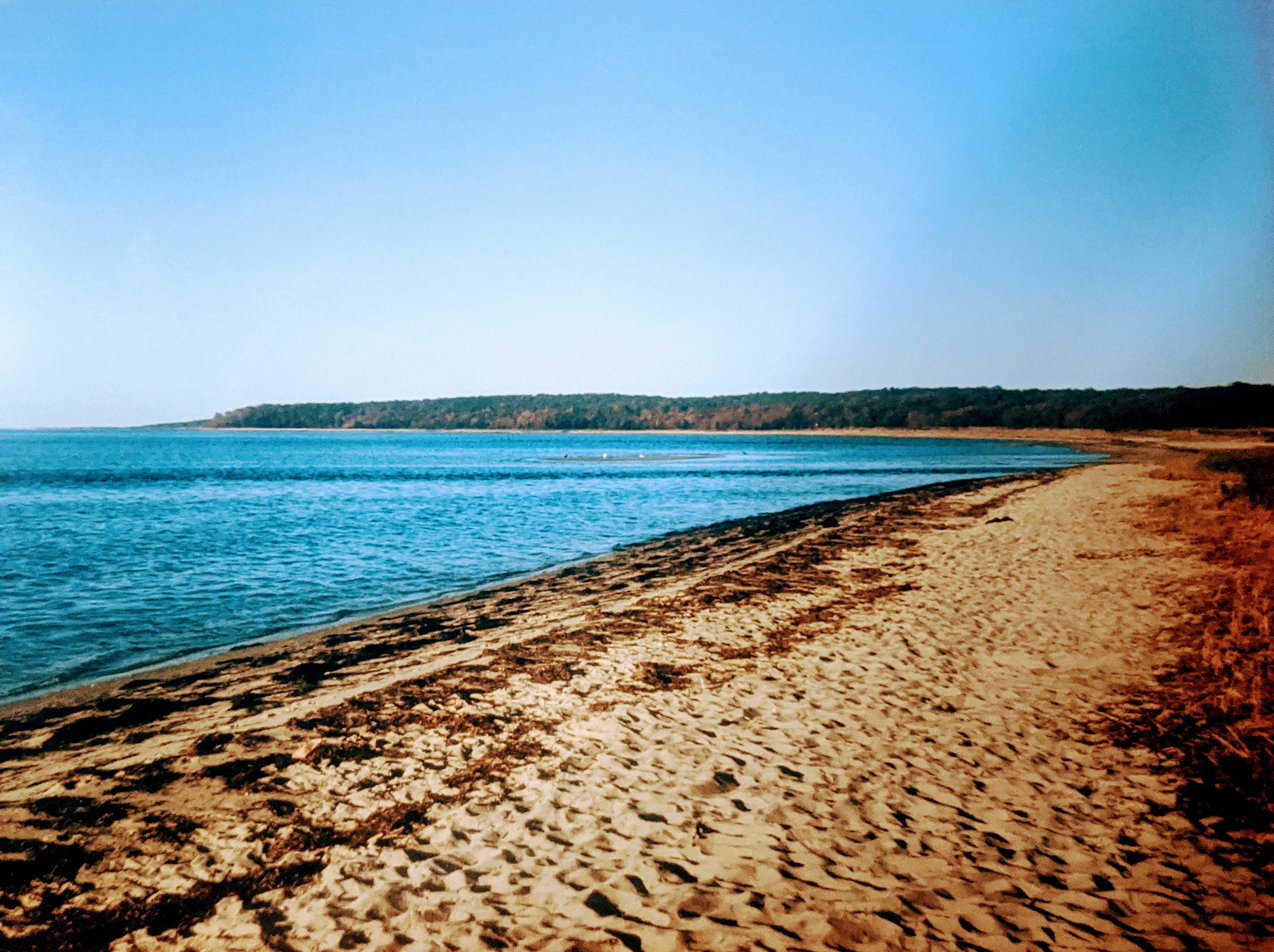
Ninevah Beach in 1992 Photo Courtesy Dr. Steven Ruffins

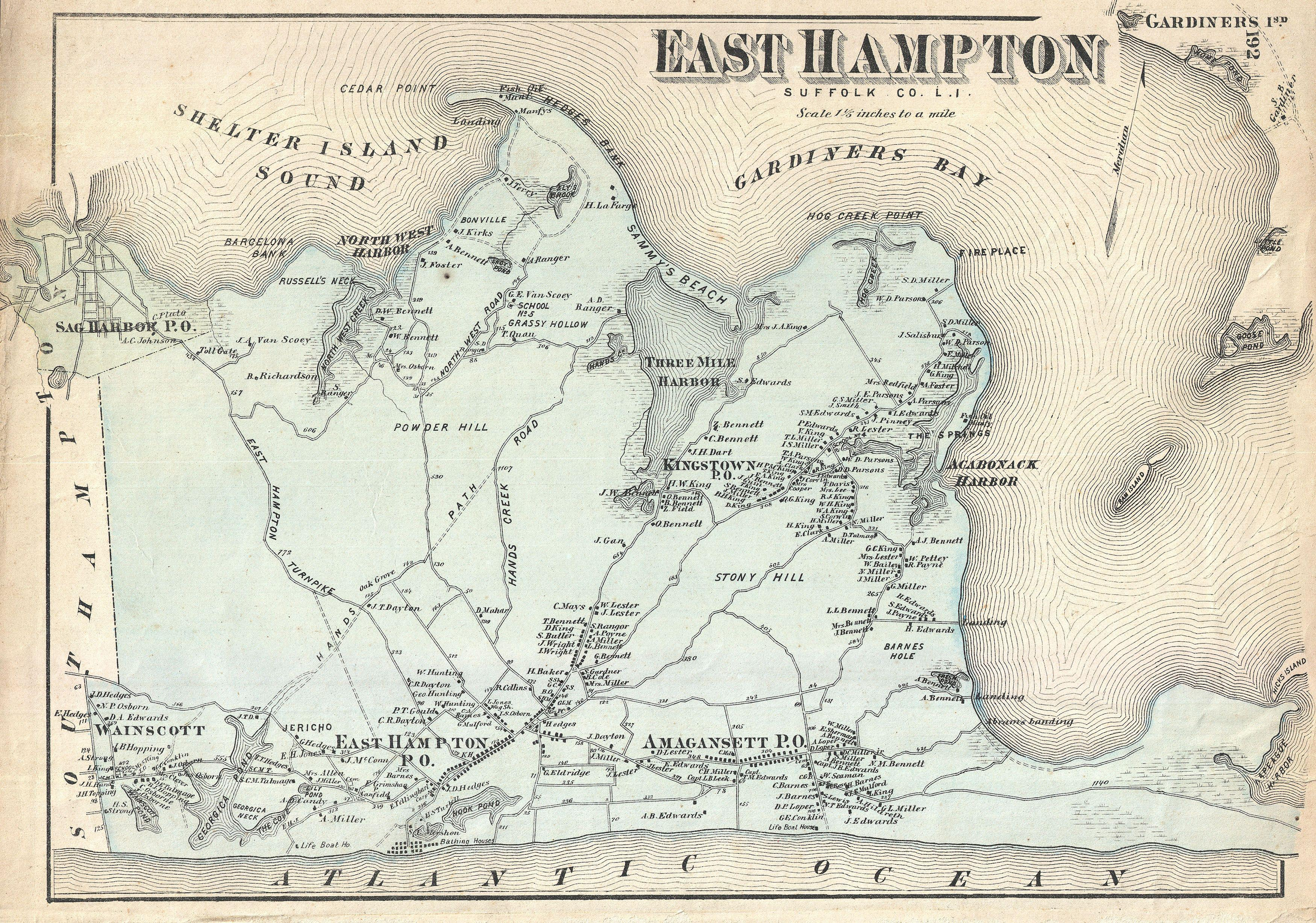
1873 Beers Map of East Hampton, Long Island, New York

Due to the proximity of HBBC to East Hampton, real estate interests have increasingly targeted the elderly population for turning over their interests, with the goal of building large mansions out of character to the middle class esthetic. House prices have climbed in the Hamptons; Sag Harbor Hills and Ninevah are in the crosshairs of investors looking for bargains. A developer bought 9 parcels, seeking town approval at a recent meeting to build a house of 5,300 square feet on several combined lots, the biggest homes in an area where the median house size is 1,378 square feet. He is opposed by a homeowner group that was originally formed to keep out big-box stores. An even larger manse, of 5,900 square feet, was proposed for four combined lots in Azurest.

== Notable visitors and residents ==
- Olivia Ward Bush-Banks, writer who chronicled the Montauketts, was born in Eastville.
- Langston Hughes, writer/poet of the Harlem Renaissance visited frequently in the 1950s to the home of his HBCU Lincoln University classmate, William Pickens III. A Hughes friend, Emily Montier Brown would later marry Pickens.
- Gloria Naylor, writer of stories which centered on the lives of African-American women
- Daisy Tapley, classical performer and race activist in the Woodrow Wilson era
- Edward R. Dudley, Manhattan Borough President and Ambassador to Liberia (Sah Harbor Hills resident)
- Renee V. H. Simons, Former President of the nonprofit HBBC Sag Harbor which elevated the subdivision to historic district status, and former corporate executive.
- William Pickens, Patriarch of four generations residence in Eastville and noted orator. Former secretary of the NAACP and descendant of James Robeson.
- Colson Whitehead, is an American novelist.
- Reynold Ruffins, is an American painter, illustrator, and graphic designer.
- Ralph Bunch, US Ambassador to the United Nations
- James Baldwin, writer
- Herbie Hancock, jazz pianist with his wife Gigi

== Gallery ==
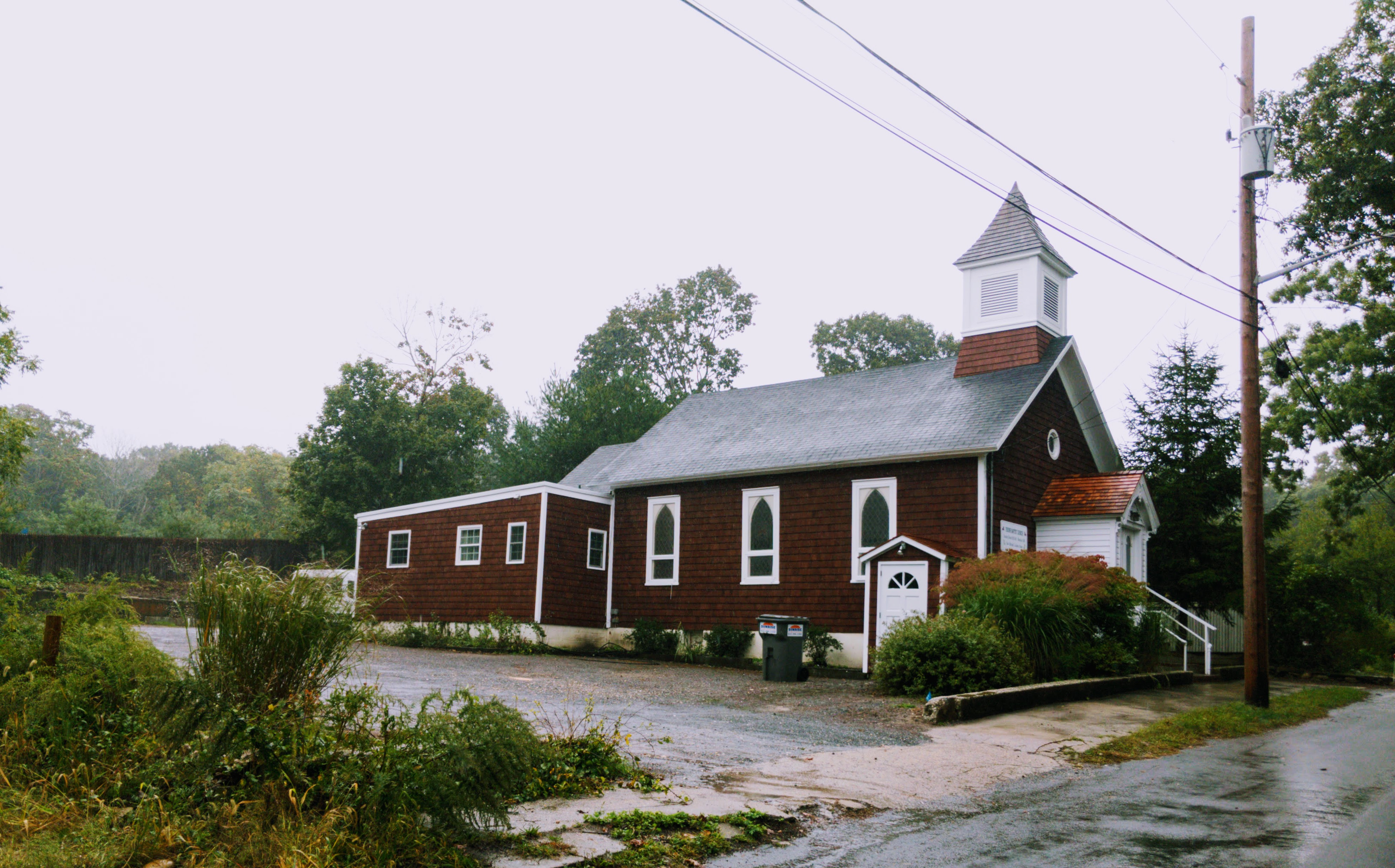
St. David AME Zion Church

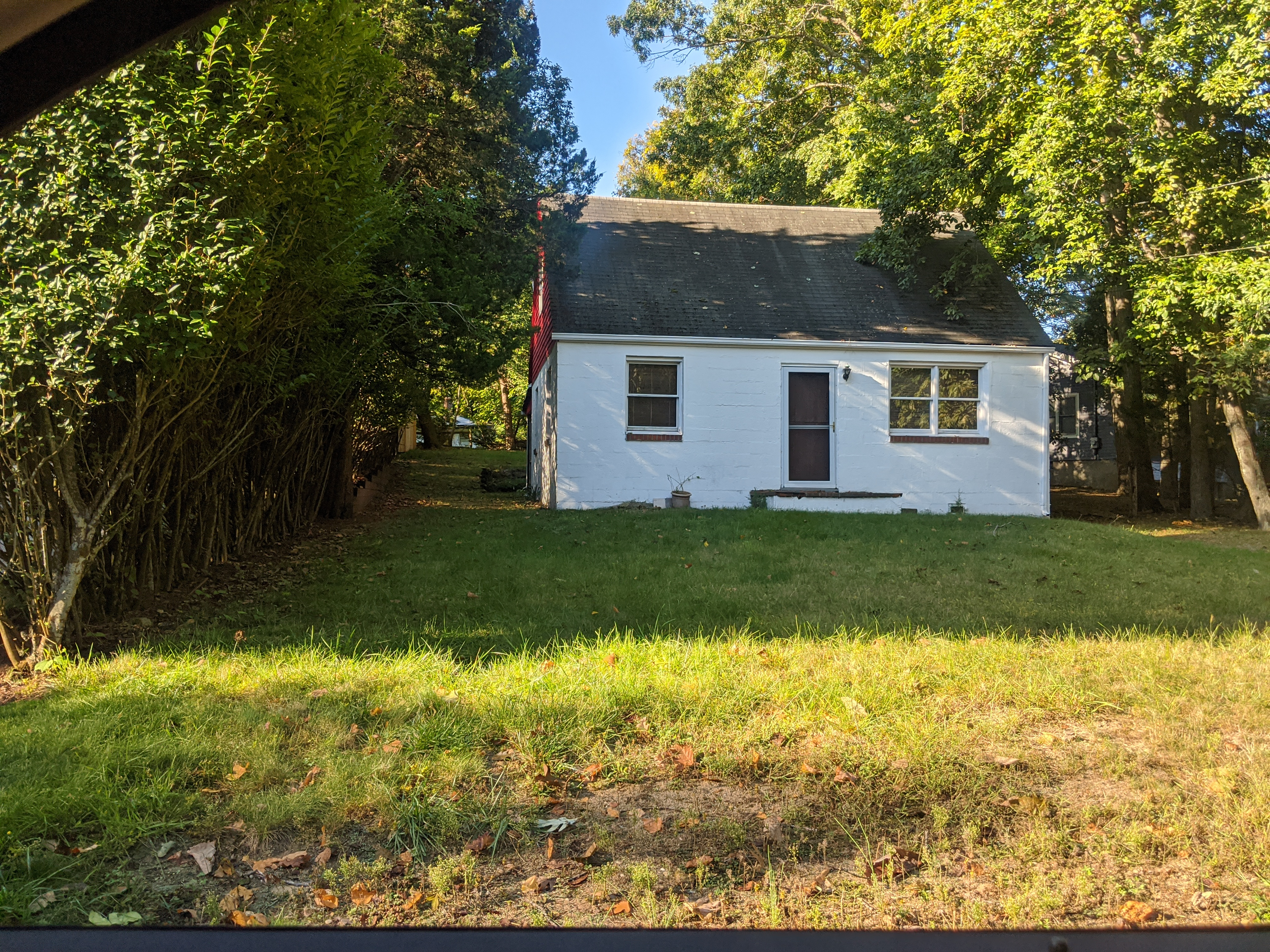
Azurest

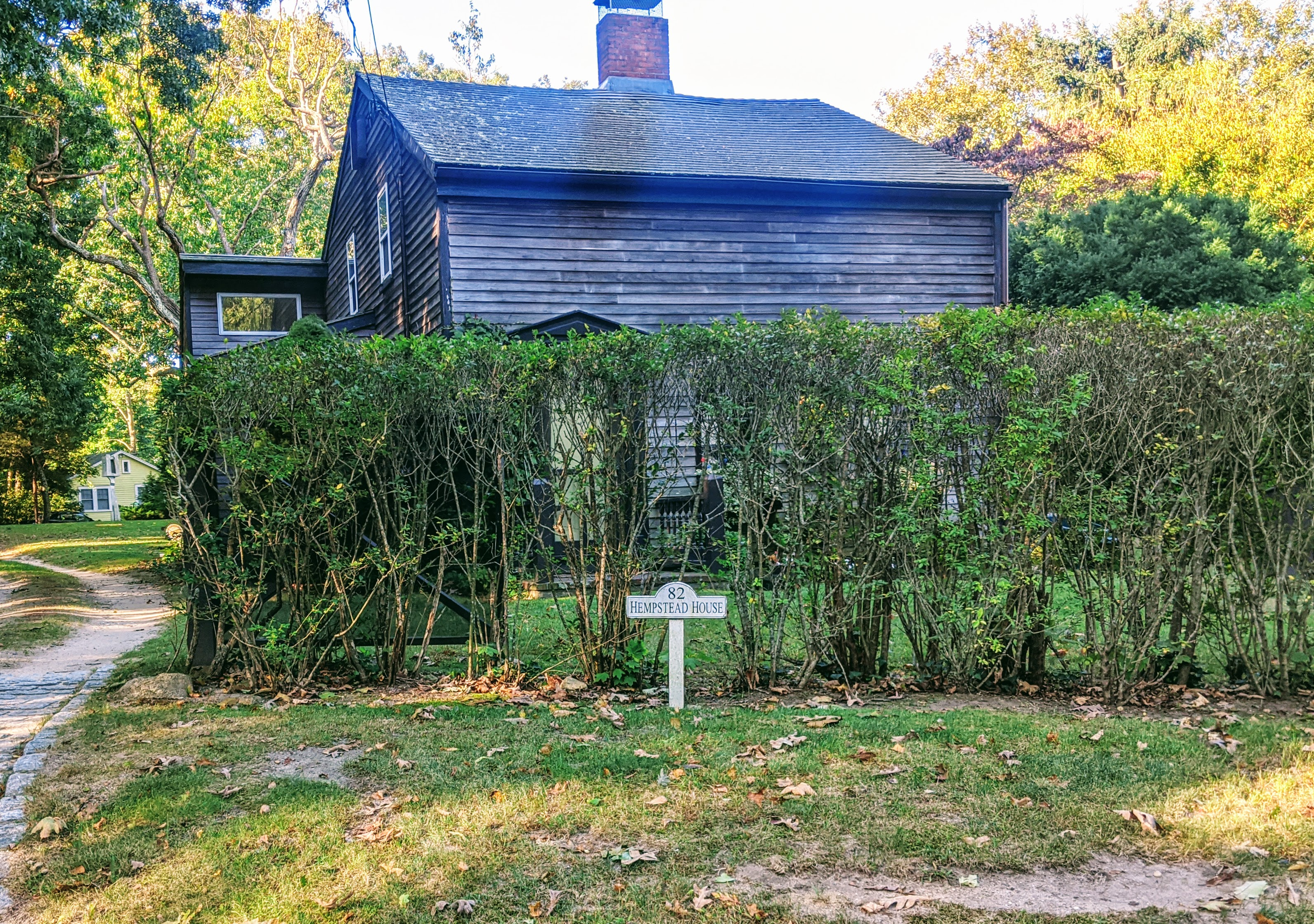
Home in Azurest

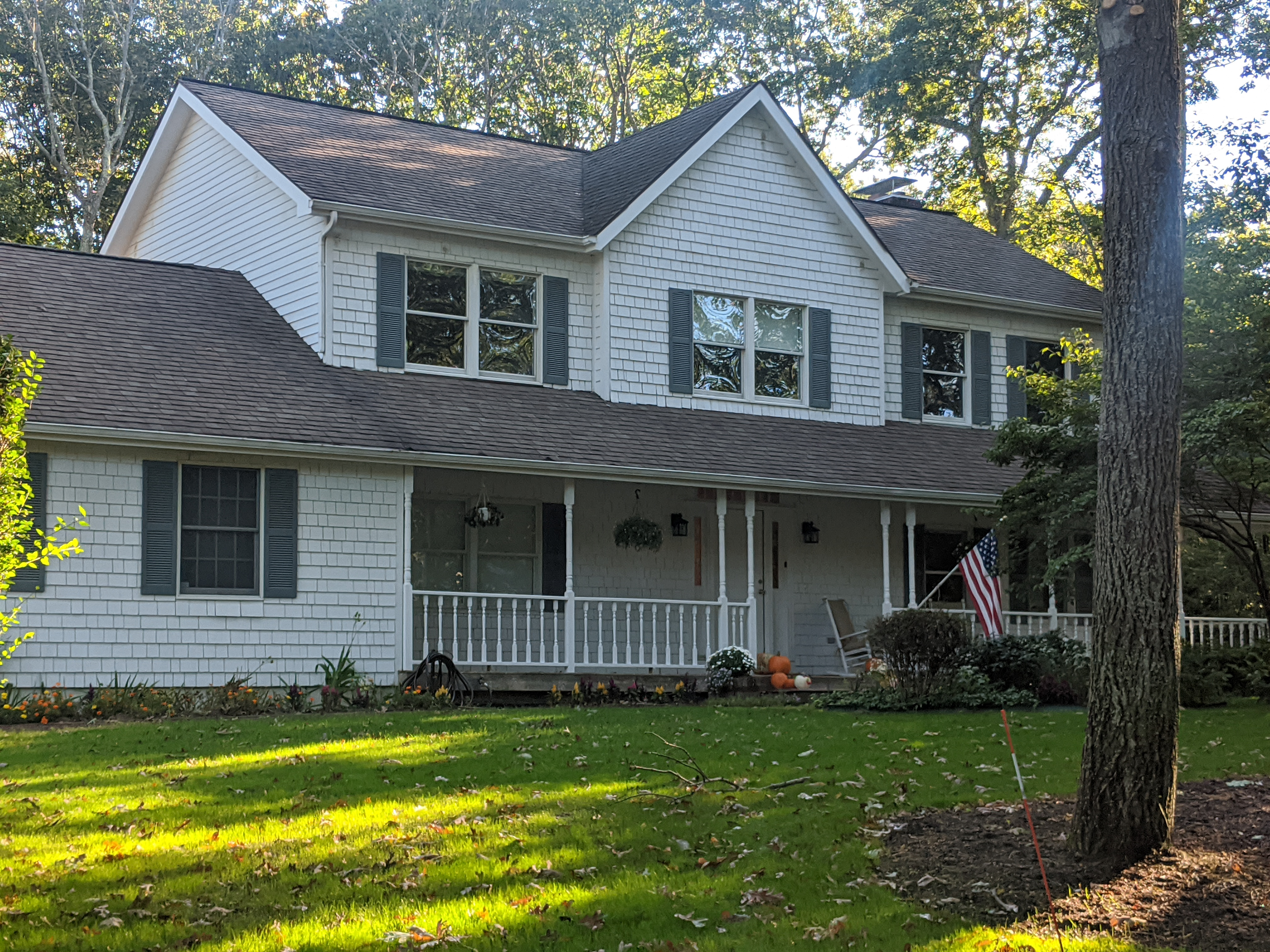
Azurest

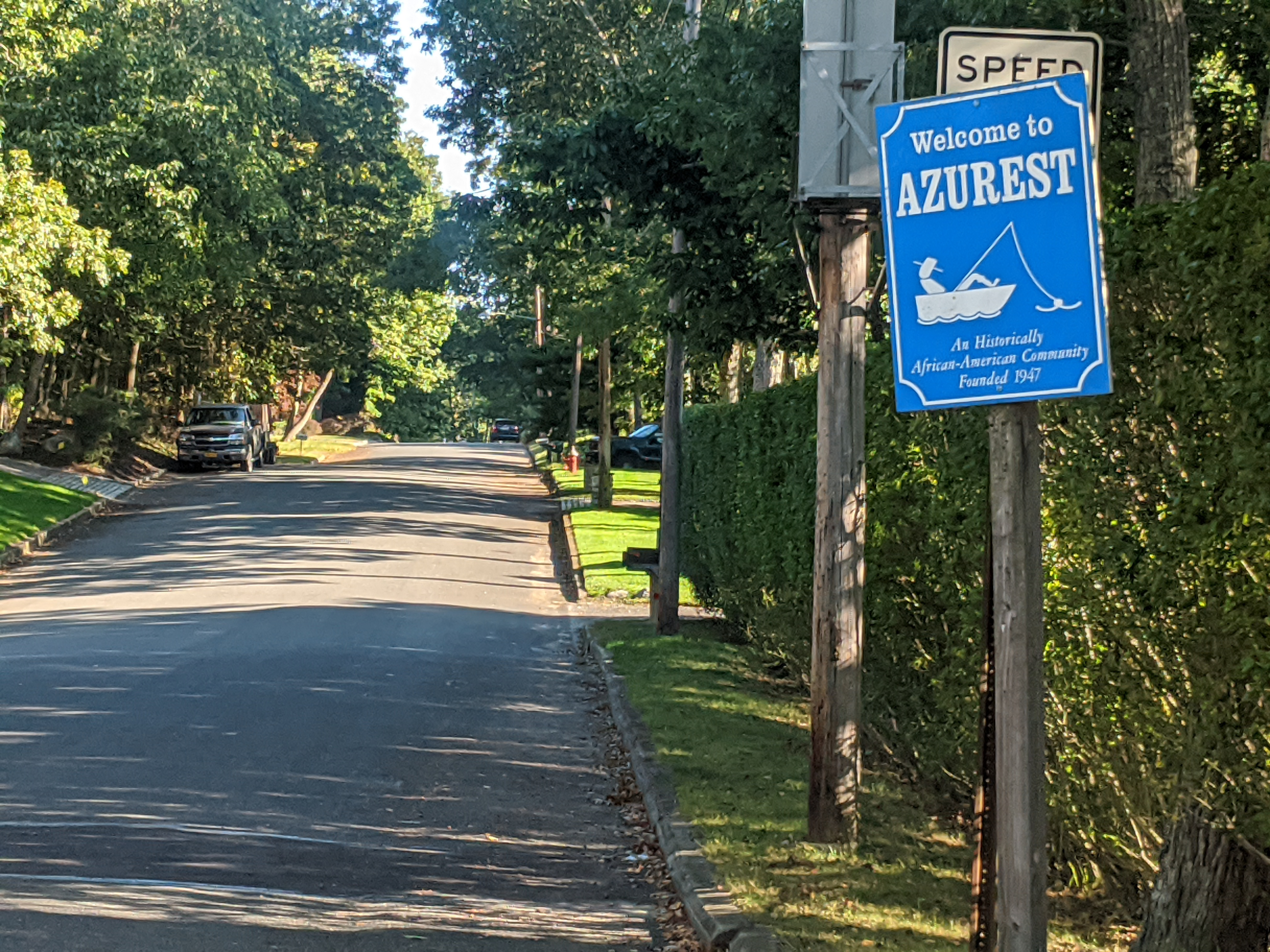
Azurest sign

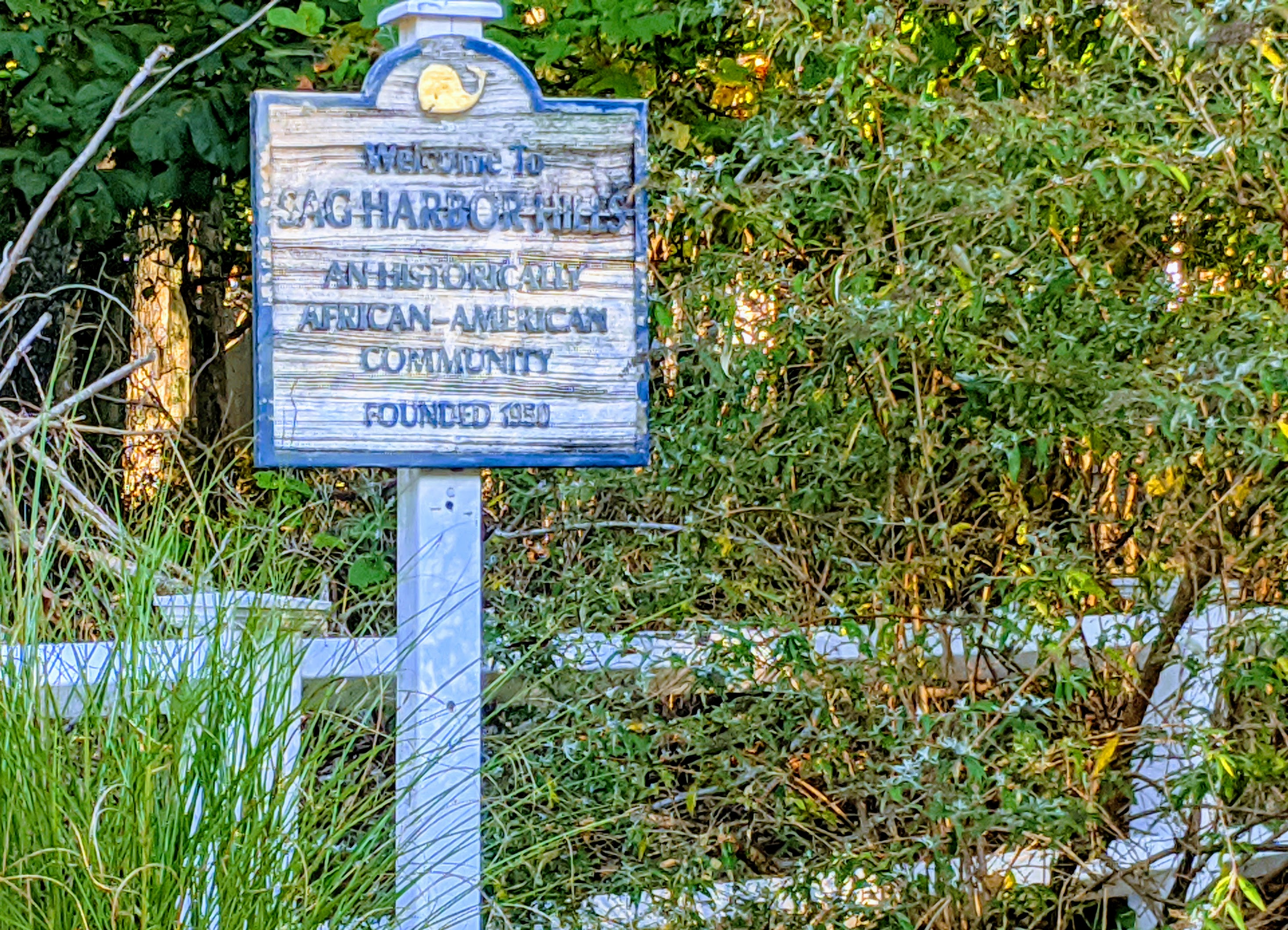
Sag Harbor Hills sign

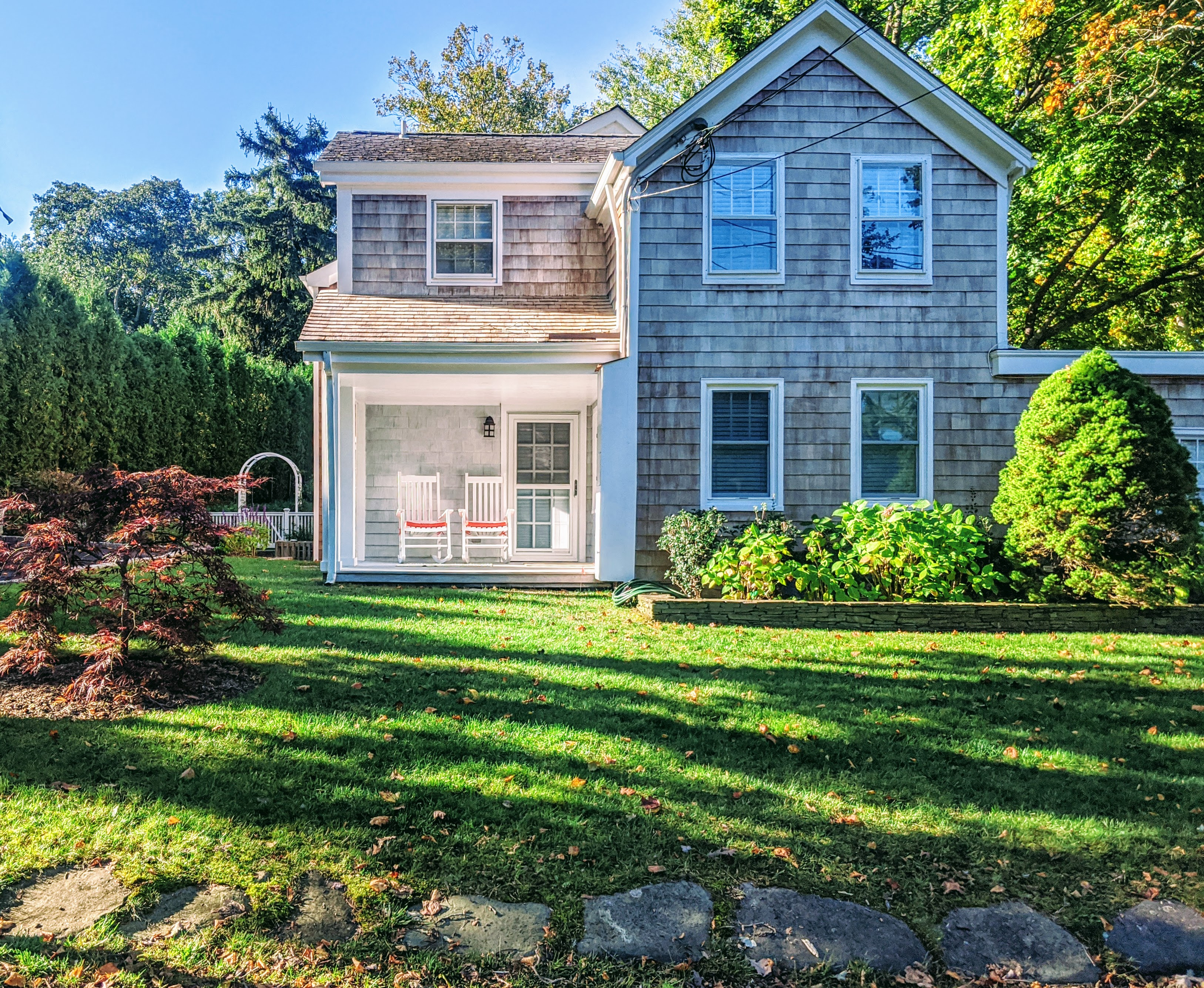
Azurest home

== See also ==
- Sag Harbor, novel by Colson Whitehead
