= Hilda Lindley =

American environmentalist (1919–1980)

Hilda Lindley, born Hilda Livingston, (5 October 1919 – 12 December 1980) founded the Concerned Citizens of Montauk (CCOM) in 1970. At the time, she lived in a private house in the middle of what is now Theodore Roosevelt County Park in Montauk, New York. Lindley became alarmed when she learned that developers planned to build 1,400 housing units in Indian Field, in the area of Big Reed Pond, and to construct a second inlet into Lake Montauk from Shagwong Point. She put an ad in The East Hampton Star inviting anyone who was interested to come to a meeting at her home in Indian Field. Those who showed up became the first members of CCOM. It took three years and countless hours of travel and testimony, but Lindley and the original CCOM finally prevailed upon Suffolk County to establish much of Indian Field as a county park.

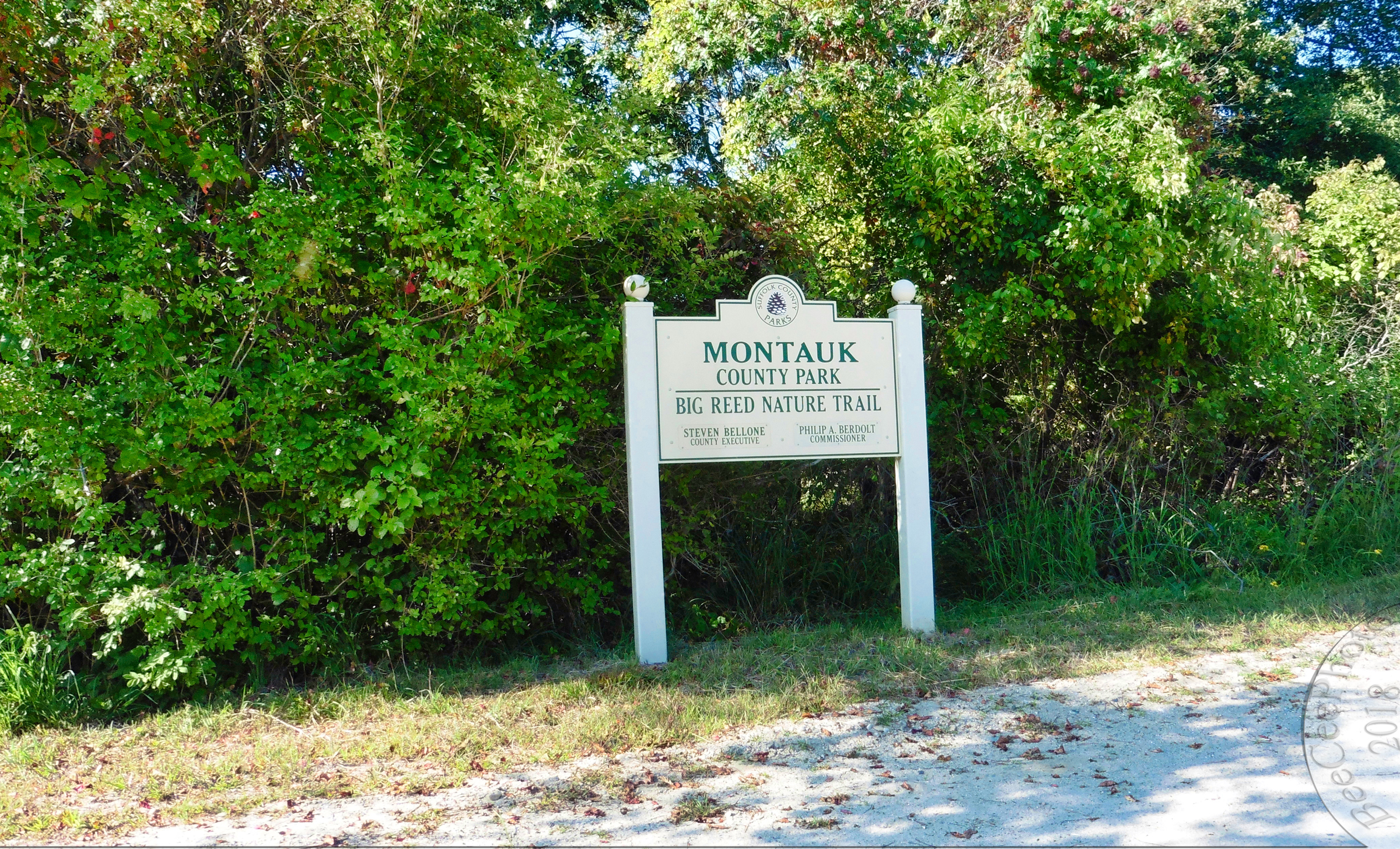
Montauk County Park in Indian Fields, Montauk, NY

After Suffolk County agreed not to allow new housing to be developed, Hilda Lindley received a notice from telling her she had thirty days to leave the property. She spent the next several years working out an agreement with the county, by which she was allowed to stay in her house for thirty-five years, after which it would revert to the county and neither she nor her estate would receive any compensation for the house or the two acres of land it was on. Hilda Lindley died in December 1980. According to her wishes, her ashes were scattered on Squaw Hill in Indian Field.

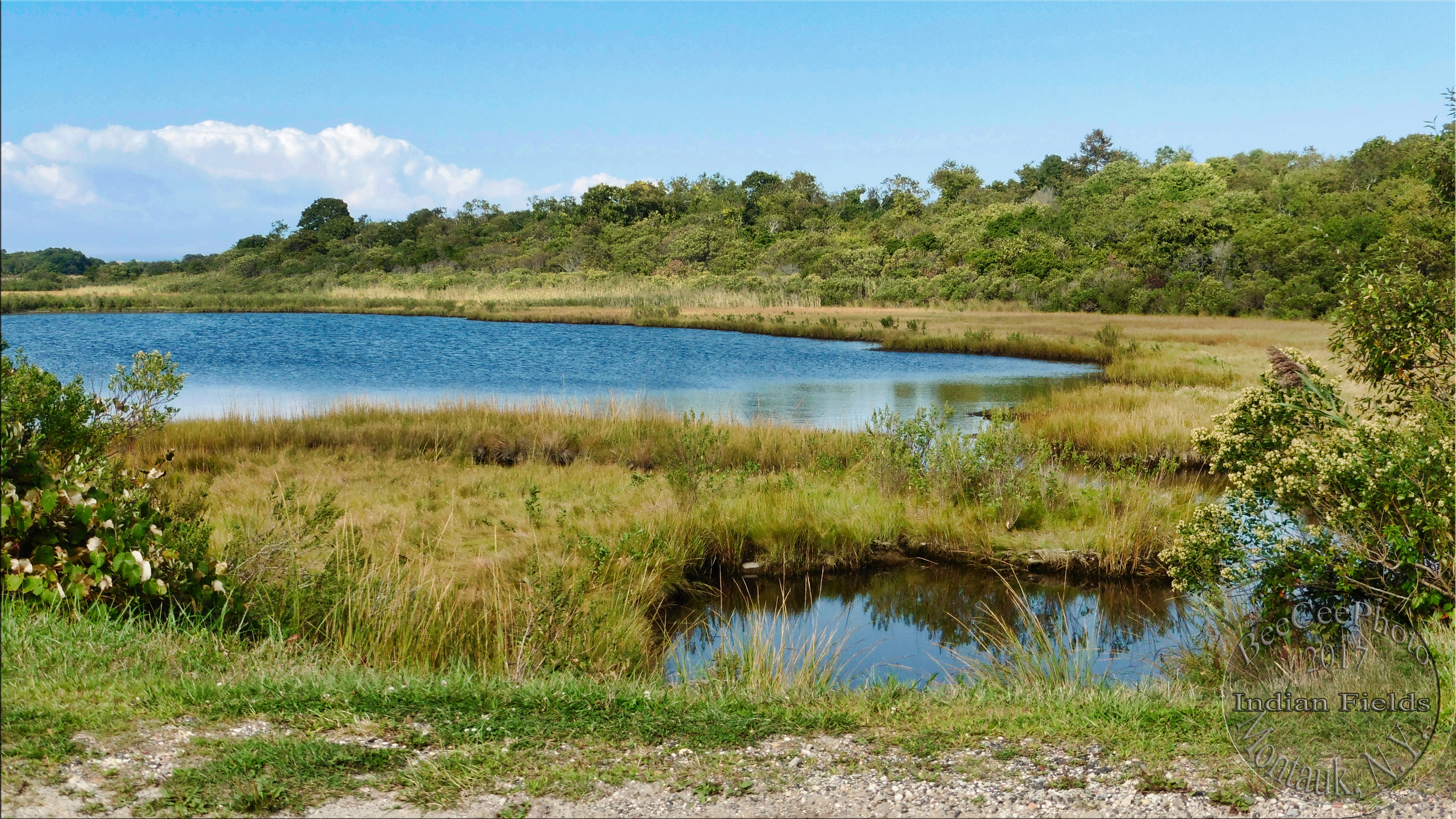
Indian Fields Montauk - Big Reed Nature Trail

In December 2010, the Suffolk County Legislature passed a bill naming her house the Hilda Lindley House in her honor.

== See also ==
Renee V. H. Simons - Anti-gentrification activist for SANS
