= Edna Meade Colson =

American university educator and activist

- Born: October 7, 1888; Petersburg, Virginia, US
- Died: January 17, 1985 (aged 96); Colonial Heights, Virginia, US
- Education: Fisk University, Columbia University
- Occupation: Educator
- Partner: Amaza Lee Meredith
- Relatives: Myra Colson Callis (sister); Henry Arthur Callis (brother-in-law)

Edna Meade Colson (October 7, 1888 – January 17, 1985) was an American educator, known for her contributions to improving access to education to Virginian African Americans.

== Biography ==
Edna Meade Colson was born on October 7, 1888, in Petersburg, Virginia. She was the oldest of five children of prominent educators, James Major Colson and Kate Deaver Hill Colson.

She received her B.A. from Fisk University in 1915 and received a Ph.D. from Teachers College, Columbia University in 1940. She and her sister Myra Colson Callis both spoke at the 1915 commencement ceremony at Fisk.

After overcoming her own obstacles to higher education, she became a champion of making graduate education available to African Americans. In 1937, Colson chaired the committee to implement the program offering graduate courses to African Americans at Virginia State University.

Colson was also politically active beyond education. She was among the first women to register to vote after the ratification of the 19th Amendment, and she was the first African-American woman to become a lifetime member of the National Association for the Advancement of Colored People.

Colson lived with her partner Amaza Lee Meredith. They occupied the house in Chesterfield County, Virginia, named "Azurest South", which was designed by Meredith.

Colson retired from Virginia State University (then Virginia State College) in 1953. She died at the age of 96 in a Colonial Heights nursing home on January 17, 1985, and was buried at Eastview Cemetery, Petersburg City, Virginia.
