= Renee V. H. Simons =

- Born: Renee V. H. Simons; 1949 (age 76–77)
- Citizenship: American
- Education: Hunter College (BA); Fordham University (MA); Columbia Business School (MBA)
- Occupations: Business executive, nonprofit executive
- Years active: 1978–present
- Employer(s): General Foods; James River Corporation; The 7 Up Company; Philip Morris USA; JPMorgan Chase
- Organization: SANS Sag Harbor
- Known for: Corporate marketing and advertising leadership; preservation of the historic African American communities of Sag Harbor Hills, Azurest, and Ninevah (SANS)
- Title: President
- Board member of: Sag Harbor Partnership; Taproot Foundation; The Advertising Club of New York; Covenant House New York
- Awards: Black Enterprise "21 Women of Power and Influence in Corporate America" (1991); Monroe College Excellence in Enterprise Award (1996); YMCA Outstanding Women of America Award

Renee V.H. Simons (born 1949) is a former Fortune 500 executive and the president of SANS Sag Harbor, an award-winning nonprofit organization that successfully organized and advocated for the New York State and National Register of Historic Places registration of the historically Black beachfront enclaves in the Sag Harbor communities of Sag Harbor Hills, Azurest, and Ninevah Subdivisions.

== Education ==
Simons holds a Master's degree in Education Planning from Fordham University and an MBA from Columbia Business School. Additionally, she earned her Bachelor's from Hunter College.

== Career ==
Simons began her career in 1978 as an assistant brand manager with General Foods Corp. She also worked as a brand manager for Dixie/Northern Products at James River Co., then as a brand manager for Seven-Up Co., for 7-Up and Diet 7-UP. She then became a group director for Phillip Morris and several brands of cigarettes. Simons was then promoted to director of sales promotion for all Philip Morris USA cigarette brands in August 1991.

Simons also served as senior vice president at JPMorgan Chase. Her roles at Fortune 500 companies included advertising, marketing, corporate communications, technology and media management and banking. She held executive level positions at The Advertising Club of NY, Covenant House-New York, and was a board member at various corporations. She was president of the Harley Simons Group (a New York Domestic Business Corporation) and a director of the Taproot Foundation. After retiring from professional life, she volunteered at the Sag Harbor Partnership, where she is on the board of directors, and became the President of SANS Sag Harbor, the non-profit that operates the Eastville Historical society.

== SANS ==
On July 10, 2019, the National Park Service officially added SANS (the Sag Harbor communities of Sag Harbor Hills, Azurest, and Ninevah Subdivisions) to the National Register of Historic Places.

The East Hampton Star reports that Simons, as president of SANS Sag Harbor, a nonprofit that advocated for the historic designation, called the designation an "honor," and recounted the history of the subdivisions: "The SANS communities were created to provide privately-owned, safe, and nurturing neighborhoods for family resort recreation and a sense of extended families. During this initial period, African-Americans were excluded by covenants and practice from most public recreation locations in the greater New York areas."

Newsday reports that Simons successfully led the effort to have SANS listed on the New York State Register of Historic Places in March 2019, and that Sen. Kirsten Gillibrand (D-New York) advocated for the inclusion of the community on the National Register of Historic Places, stating, "As one of the last remaining African American beachfront communities in the country, the SANS Historic District holds important historic value that must be protected." When the New York State Board for Historic Preservation nominated SANS for the national register, Simons stated, "Today's efforts once again underscore . . . the existence of African-American contributions in the long history of America." In March 2019, Simons told The Wall Street Journal, "There’s a lot of pride to be recognized this way" and "It codifies the history. I thought it was very important to establish the importance of the area versus being a footnote."

Sandra E. Garcia, writing for The New York Times Style Magazine in October 2020, recounts a history of the SANS community and reports that Simons, who has a home in Sag Harbor Hills, helped lead fundraising efforts for the national and state landmark applications. Garcia also writes, "there are 195 buildings in the subdivisions — which, alongside several other sites and structures, collectively go by the acronym SANS — all erected before circa 1977 across the 154 acres that lie north of Sag Harbor village’s Hampton Street, which still divides the predominantly white community from the historic Black one."

The Sag Harbor Express reports that Simons promoted the landmark application effort through meetings, fundraising and petition drives, and she reached out to the National Organization of Minority Architects (NOMA) for help with the process, which sent 25 volunteers. The Montauk Sun reports that the organizing efforts included obtaining a grant from The Robert David Lion Gardiner Foundation and conducting an Intensive Cultural Resource Survey to produce the required documentation for the applications. Simons discussed the efforts with The Wall Street Journal in 2017, stating, "If we don’t say anything we’ll lose the essence of this neighborhood," and "Children won’t remember what it took to be here."

== Honors ==
- In 1991, Simons was named by Black Enterprise magazine as one of "21 Women Of Power And Influence In Corporate America"
- In 1996, Simons was honored by Monroe College for her business accomplishments and community service, gaining the 'Excellence in Enterprise Award' during its Black History Month celebrations.
- Simons also received the YMCA's Outstanding Women of America award.
- On December 4, 2019, the nearly four-year volunteer effort by The Sag Harbor Hills, Azurest & Ninevah Steering Committee was awarded the Excellence in Historic Preservation Organizational Achievement award from the New York State Office of Parks, Recreation and Historic Preservation. The Sag Harbor Express reports that the community engagement coordinator for the state office of historic preservation, Daniel McEneny, "said the SANS effort "scored exceptionally well," and the committee was "specifically recognized for the achievement in working together.""
- 2020 Project Excellence Award for "exceptional community-based advocacy for historic preservation and documents significant Jim Crow- and Civil Rights-era historic resources on Long Island" from Preservation Long Island to the community sponsors of the Sag Harbor Hills, Azurest, and Ninevah Subdivisions (SANS) National Register Historic District Survey and Nomination, including chair Renee V. H. Simons.

== See also ==
- Hilda Lindley - Anti-development activist who stood against Montauk development (Indian Fields) by real estate interlopers.
- Northwest Alliance - Environmental activists with concern over the Northwest Creek/harbor area of East Hampton, NY
