= A Complicated Marriage: My Life with Clement Greenberg =

A Complicated Marriage: My Life with Clement Greenberg is a memoir by Janice van Horne, published by Counterpoint Press in 2012. The book begins with the couple's meeting in 1955 and follows van Horne's parallel searches for artistic and personal identity.

== Reception ==
The East Hampton Star described the memoir as offering "a fresh perspective that sheds light on the interior life of Clement Greenberg, not only as the esteemed art critic but as a husband, lover, and off and on companion of nearly 40 years." Writing in artcritical, David Cohen observed that van Horne had produced an "autobiography masquerading as memoir," arguing that the book's real subject was as much her own developing identity as it was her husband's character. Michael Kammen, writing in the Los Angeles Review of Books, traced van Horne's roles as actress, playwright, and magazine editor against the backdrop of the couple's unconventional domestic arrangements.
