= Janice van Horne =

American writer and editor (1934–2015)

Janice Van Horne
- Born: 1934; New York City, New York, U.S.
- Died: October 14, 2015; New York City, New York, U.S.
- Education: Bennington College (B.A., 1955)
- Occupations: Writer, editor, playwright
- Spouse: Clement Greenberg

Janice Van Horne (1934 - October 14, 2015) was an American writer, editor, and playwright. She is best known as the spouse of the art critic Clement Greenberg. She served as literary executor of Greenberg's estate, editing two posthumous collections of his writing from the Getty Research Library archives.

== Early life and education ==
Van Horne was born in New York City and raised in the suburb of Rye, New York. She graduated from Bennington College in 1955. After completing her studies, she moved to Manhattan and began building an independent life in New York City.

== Marriage ==
In October 1955, at a post-opening party in Greenwich Village, Van Horne met Clement Greenberg, then 46 years old and widely regarded as the most influential art critic in America. Seven months later, the couple married. Van Horne's family disowned her for marrying a Jewish man.

The marriage brought Van Horne into contact with the leading figures of postwar American art. The couple spent summers in East Hampton, where they were neighbors and friends of Jackson Pollock and Lee Krasner. They also knew Hans Hofmann, Willem de Kooning, Franz Kline, David Smith, and Helen Frankenthaler. In 1960, she and Greenberg moved into a Central Park West apartment, where Van Horne would reside for the rest of her life.

The couple's relationship evolved over time into an open marriage and, at one point, a legal divorce, though they continued living together and later remarried.

== Career ==
After the birth of her daughter Sarah Dora, Van Horne pursued a career in the theater, acting in numerous Off-Off-Broadway productions and studying at the Actors Studio. During this period she also spent time in Los Angeles, attending writers' workshops and working with the Actors 'Studio's West Coast affiliate.

In 1974, Van Horne co-founded Madison Avenue magazine and served as its editor-in-chief.

In the 1980s, Van Horne turned from acting to playwriting. Her plays were produced in both Los Angeles and New York City, and her one-act Fine Line received critical notice.

Following Greenberg's death in 1994, Van Horne bequeathed his papers to the Getty Research Institute and arranged the sale of the remaining works in his art collection to the Portland Art Museum in Oregon. She edited two volumes drawn from the Getty archive. The first, Homemade Esthetics: Observations on Art and Taste (Oxford University Press, 1999), collected Greenberg's Bennington College lectures and related talks. It was named a New York Times Notable Book of the Year. The second, The Harold Letters, 1928–1943: The Making of an American Intellectual (Counterpoint, 2000), presented Greenberg's correspondence with his college friend Harold Lazarus. Van Horne also entrusted a collection of Greenberg's late writings, consisting largely of talks and interviews, to the critic Robert C. Morgan, who edited them for the University of Minnesota Press.

Van Horne's memoir, A Complicated Marriage: My Life with Clement Greenberg, was published by Counterpoint Press in 2012.

== Death ==
Van Horne died on October 14, 2015, of COPD.

== Bibliography ==
=== As editor ===
- Greenberg, Clement. Homemade Esthetics: Observations on Art and Taste. New York: Oxford University Press, 1999. ISBN 978-0195123357.
- Greenberg, Clement. The Harold Letters, 1928–1943: The Making of an American Intellectual. Ed. Janice van Horne. Washington, D.C.: Counterpoint, 2000. ISBN 978-1582430683.

=== As author ===
- A Complicated Marriage: My Life with Clement Greenberg. Berkeley: Counterpoint, 2012. ISBN 978-1582438214.

== See also ==
- Abstract expressionism
- New York School (art)
