= Myra Colson Callis =

American social worker

- Born: Myra Hill Colson; March 13, 1892; Petersburg, Virginia, U.S.
- Died: 1979 (aged 86–87)
- Occupations: Social worker, educator, researcher, YWCA administrator
- Spouse: Henry Arthur Callis
- Relatives: Edna Meade Colson (sister)

Myra Hill Colson Callis (March 13, 1892 – 1979) was an American social worker, educator, researcher, and YWCA administrator, best known for her work on employment.

== Early life and education ==
Colson was born in Petersburg, Virginia, the daughter of James Major Colson II and Kate Deaver Hill Colson. Her father was principal of the Virginia Normal and Collegiate Institute. Her mother and siblings also worked in education; her older sister was educator Edna Meade Colson.

Colson graduated from Fisk University in 1915; she and her sister Edna both spoke at the commencement ceremony. She earned a master's degree in social service administration at the University of Chicago, with a thesis titled "Home Work Among Negro Women in Chicago." She was a member of Alpha Kappa Alpha.

== Career ==
Callis taught high school science in Virginia for several years after college. She began working for the YWCA in 1919, and held jobs at YWCA branches in Ohio, Pennsylvania, and Chicago between 1919 and 1927. She was the first African-American woman to earn certification from the national training school for YWCA secretaries. From 1928 to 1930, she was a researcher and instructor at the Tuskegee Institute. From 1930 to 1932, she worked with Carter G. Woodson on data for his The Negro in the Professions project. She was a social worker and researcher in Washington, D.C. in the 1930s and 1940s, specializing in employment and placement services for Black women. She also spoke on the topic to community groups and YWCA conferences. In 1935, she joined the faculty of the Atlanta School of Social Service.

After World War II, Callis was supervisor of household operations at the United States Employment Service (USES) in Washington. She retired from USES in 1951.

== Publications ==
- "Negro Home Workers in Chicago" (1923)
- "The Employment of Negroes in the District of Columbia" (1936, with Lorenzo Johnston Greene and Carter G. Woodson)

== Personal life ==
Colson married physician and medical school professor Henry Arthur Callis in 1927, as his third wife. Her husband died in 1974, and she died in 1979. Her papers are in the collection of Howard University. Her family's papers are in the Johnston Memorial Library, Virginia State University.
