= Hilda Lindley House =

Former U.S. army fire control station

Coordinates: 41°04′34″N 71°54′07″W

The Hilda Lindley House is a former U.S. Army fire control station in Indian Field in Montauk, New York. The house is named for the woman who lived there and saved Indian Field from development in the 1970s, but who had her house taken from her by Suffolk County as a result.

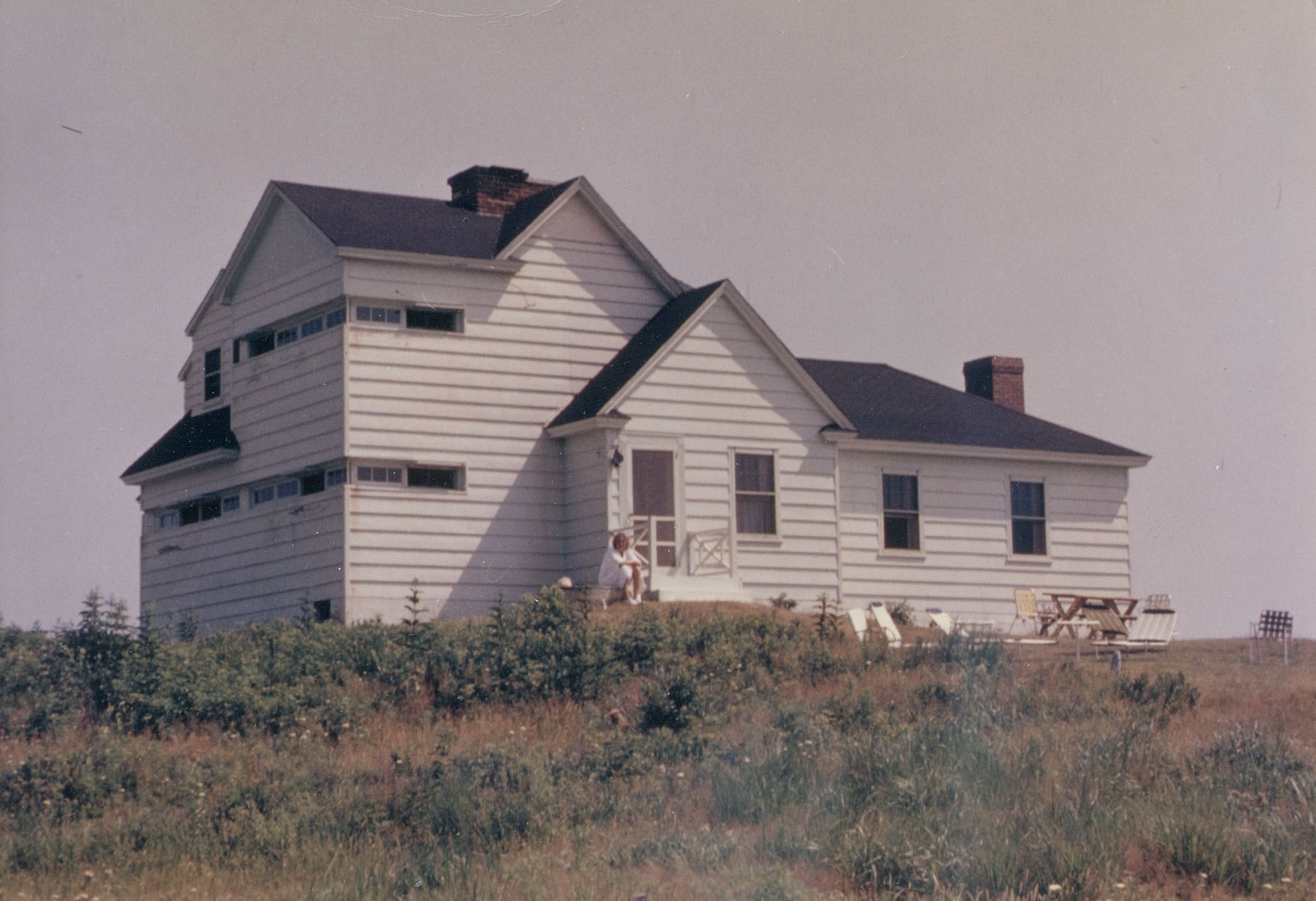
The Hilda Lindley House, 1960s

== Location and overview of the Hilda Lindley House ==
Set in the middle of more than 1,000 acres (400 ha) of rolling hills, moors, ponds, wetlands, and grasslands called Indian Field, the Hilda Lindley House sits at the eastern tip of Long Island, between Shagwong Point and Montauk Point, and overlooks Block Island Sound and parts of the Connecticut and Rhode Island coast. The house was built in 1944 by the U.S. Army as a fire control station. It was constructed as part of a national fire-control system along the coasts of the United States to spot enemy ships and aircraft. Made of reinforced concrete but designed to look like a simple cottage, it is named for Hilda Lindley, who, with her husband, Francis Vinton Lindley, bought the house in 1950 after it was made surplus by the Army. In the 1970s, after Indian Field was threatened by developers who proposed to build a large housing development, Hilda Lindley organized resistance and saved the land. Forming Montauk's first environmental group, she started a movement that went on to preserve much of Montauk as open space, despite heavy development pressure from the suburbs and New York City, a little more than 100 miles (160 km) away.

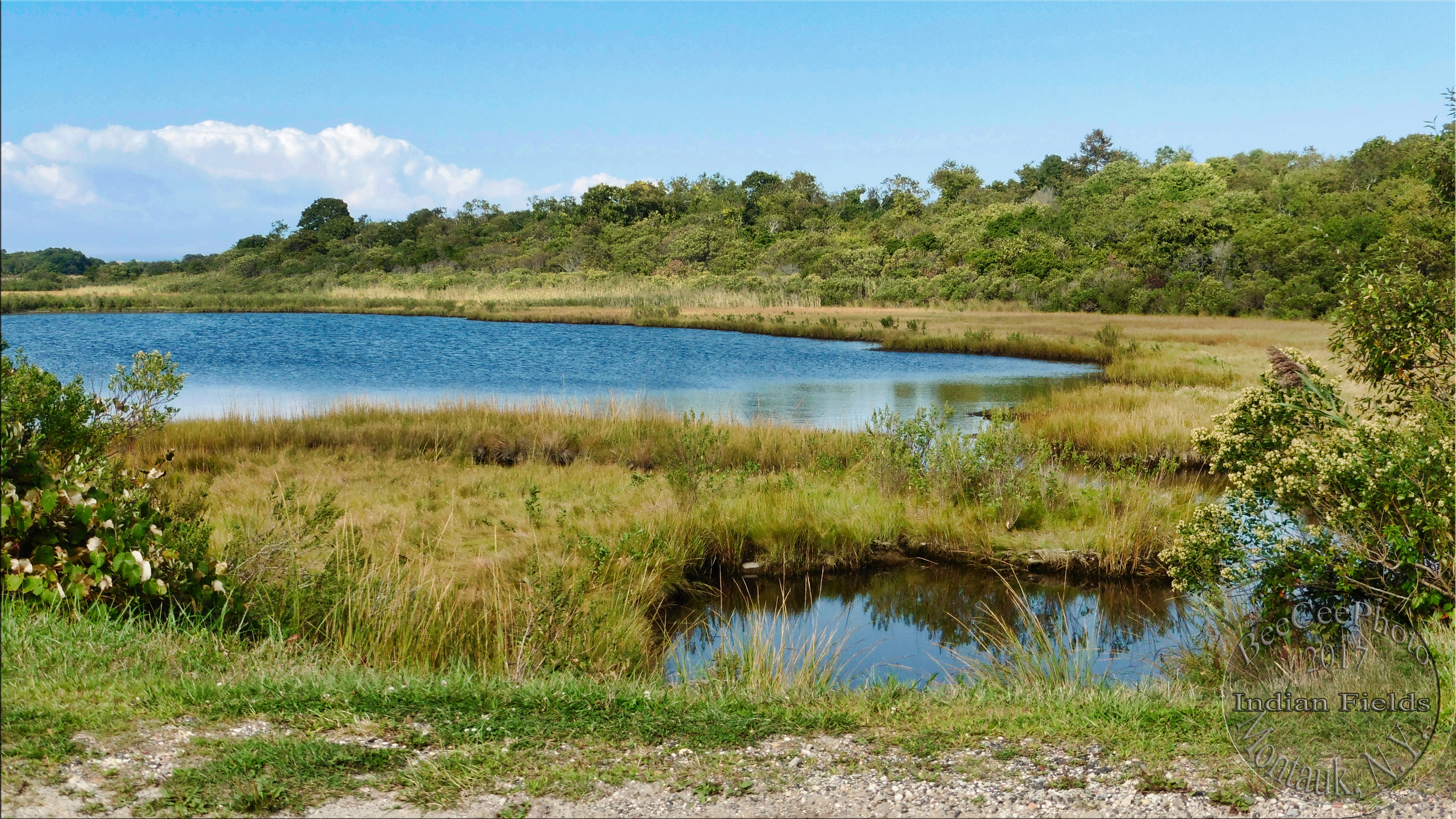
Indian Fields Montauk Big Reed Nature Trail

In 1970, Hilda Lindley founded an environmental group called the Concerned Citizens of Montauk (CCOM) to save Indian Field's unique natural and cultural history after developers proposed to build up to 1,800 houses on its 1,000 windswept, pristine acres. After a long and bitter political fight, Lindley and the CCOM succeeded in convincing the Suffolk County Legislature to buy much of Indian Field for parkland. County officials insisted on taking Lindley's house and land via eminent domain, however.

Many saw the county's move to take Lindley's house as an act of political revenge, because she had angered powerful business and political interests by saving the land from development. After several years of legal and political negotiation, Lindley and Suffolk County agreed to a lease, by which she and her family were allowed to stay in the house for 35 years. Hida Lindley died of breast cancer in December 1980, but her three children and their families continued to live in the house. In 2010, the Suffolk County Parks Commissioner, Joseph D. Montuori, ordered the family that had saved Indian Field to leave it.

== Early history of Indian Field ==
Indian Field was the last home of the Montaukett, or Montauk, Indians, whose lands in Montauk were gradually taken over by the European settlers, mostly English, who began arriving on the South Fork of Long Island in the late 1640s. An initial purchase of much of the Montauketts’ land was made in 1648 by Thomas Stanton, sent to negotiate with the Indians by Governors Eaton of New Haven and Hopkins of Connecticut, though scholars believe that the Indians did not share the English settlers’ concept of private property and thought they were merely selling the right to hunt there. Despite some Indian resistance, often feeble due to a Montaukett population weakened by disease and their new-found dependence on an exotic and different way of living established by the European settlers, the English colonists kept expanding their use and purchase of the Montauketts’ lands to the east. In 1702, the Trustees of the Town of East Hampton made an agreement with the Montauketts for their land in Montauk, with the promise of principal and yearly payments and that the Indians could “plant and improve” Indian Field, the fertile area east of Great Pond (now called Lake Montauk) and northwest of Oyster Pond. Montauketts continued to live, hunt, fish, and gather in Indian Field into the late 19th century, and some of the remains of their houses and root cellars there have been the subjects of archaeological digs.

It is estimated that somewhere between 12 and 30 Montauketts were living in Indian Field in 1879, the year that Arthur Benson, a Brooklyn businessman and the developer of Brooklyn's Bensonhurst section, bought most of Montauk at auction from the East Hampton Town Trustees for $151,000. Benson, who liked to hunt and fish in Montauk, soon began building houses designed by the noted architect Stanford White for rich friends to enjoy near the ocean. Though he originally denied any commercial plans for Montauk, Benson, in association with another wealthy businessman named Austin Corbin, hoped to extend the Long Island Railroad east to Montauk and to turn the little fishing hamlet into a major hub for transatlantic shipping. The concept was that freight and passengers could be transferred from ships arriving at Montauk to the Long Island Railroad for transportation to New York City, thus cutting a day off the transatlantic trip between European ports and New York. The plan never came to fruition due to economic and political circumstances, however.

The East Hampton Town Trustees sold Benson the land, including Indian Field, “subject to the rights and privileges of the Montauk Tribe of Indians.” Attempting to clear title, Benson hired Nathaniel Dominy VII, East Hampton's assessor, to convince the few Montauketts remaining in Indian Field to move to East Hampton. The Montauketts were mostly illiterate and were made false promises that they could return to Montauk whenever they pleased. They signed an agreement, in exchange for a small amount of money and having their modest dwellings in Indian Field moved to Freetown, in East Hampton.

The change troubled other Montauketts living elsewhere. They had not been approached by Dominy, on the theory that they had relinquished any claim to the land by moving away. After meeting as a group, the Montauketts began a series of legal and political efforts to regain Indian Field. These continued through 1924, but were unsuccessful.

== Construction as a fire control station by the U.S. Army Corps of Engineers ==
The Hilda Lindley House was built as a fire control station and completed by the US Army Corps of Engineers in the spring of 1944. It was one of 10 fire control stations built in Montauk and hundreds erected along the US coastline throughout World War II. The primary purpose of the fire-control system was to look for enemy shipping. If a ship or aircraft were sighted, it was the duty of the soldiers manning the fire-control station to determine coordinates of its position and direction, and relay them to the nearest battery to fire at and destroy the invader.

Some fire control stations, like the Hilda Lindley House and five others built in Montauk during World War II, were disguised to look like cottages, while others were constructed as simple, reinforced dugouts or as towers. One, on Gardiner's Island, northwest of Montauk, was even built to look like a windmill in an attempt to fool German mariners. Fire control stations were manned by members of the Army's Coast Artillery Corps.

Like the other fire control stations in Montauk, the Hilda Lindley House was meant to safeguard an important shipping approach to New York and southern New England, including Narragansett Bay. These Army lookouts, containing observation instruments and constructed mainly of reinforced concrete, were built to serve as eyes for the batteries of big guns located at Camp Hero, just west of the Montauk Lighthouse. The fire control stations built during World War II were some of the last of a long line of U.S. coastal defense lookouts dating to the turn of the century, after the Spanish–American War and the public's mounting fears of invasion gave rise to increased fortification of America's coasts. Technological improvements in fire control that began in the early 20th century made fire-control stations important for improving the accuracy of batteries' guns and seacoast defense through World War II.

After World War II, coastal defense strategy shifted to preventing air and missile attacks. With the development and improvement of radar, radar stations assumed the task of spotting potential threats. Other changes in modern warfare, including the invention of cruise missiles and atomic bombs, also made the fire-control system obsolete.

The Hilda Lindley House was built by the Army at a cost of about $22,000. The two-story structure, standing on a hill about 87 feet (27 m) above mean low tide and approximately a half-mile (800 m) back from the beach, contained two instrument rooms on the ground floor and another instrument room on the second floor, where soldiers used azimuth telescopes to look for enemy shipping on Block Island Sound. The soldiers looked through the fire control station's characteristic mullioned observation slots — long, narrow windows with vertical supports.

The ground floor also contained a kitchen, mess hall with an 8-by-4-foot (2.4 by 1.2 m) mess table, latrine complete with urinals, duckwalk, and showers and barracks equipped with six double-decker bunk beds and a drinking fountain for the soldiers stationed there. Five space heaters, fed with coal, provided heat, and a 5-kilowatt gasoline generator in the basement supplied electric power. A coal-fired hot water heater supplied hot water for the troops. Soldiers climbed to the second floor via iron rungs.

== The Lindley family ==
As World War II wound to a close, the Army troops withdrew from the Hilda Lindley House. Fire control stations had become obsolete, and the Hilda Lindley House was eventually transferred to the ownership of the Montauk Beach Company, a legacy of Carl Fisher, the real estate speculator and developer who had tried and failed in the 1920s to make Montauk the Miami Beach of the North. His plans had been ruined by hurricanes in Florida and the economic fallout of the Great Depression, leaving him bankrupt and Montauk largely the bucolic backwater and fishing village it had been for many years.

Hilda and Francis Lindley offered $5,000 for the house and two acres in 1950, closing on the property in January 1951. The house was in bad shape, and was littered with beer bottles and other trash from vandals and squatters who had broken into it during the five years it stood empty.

After purchasing the house, the Lindleys cleaned up the place, adding a couple of bedrooms and a bathroom in unfinished attic space on the second floor and replacing the iron rungs from the first floor to the second with a staircase. The house remained close to its original and distinctive Army design, however, retaining the narrow slot windows, or mullioned observation slots, that had been installed in its three instrument rooms for spotting enemy activity.

Today, iron rungs still lead up an interior wall to a crow's nest, once disguised as a fake brick chimney on the roof. The remote house, accessible only by a mile-long dirt road, depended on a generator for intermittent electricity, mainly to run a pump that brought up water from an artesian well designed and built by the Army. The Lindleys used kerosene lamps and candles for light, and propane gas to fuel a stove, refrigerator, and hot water heater. Indoor heating came from several Army space heaters and pot-belly stoves, and later from a fireplace and wood-burning stove.

== The fight to save Indian Field and the Hilda Lindley House ==
Hilda and Francis Lindley divorced in 1956, but Hilda Lindley continued to occupy the house seasonally, working in New York City to support her three children, Diana, John, and Daniel. The family maintained the house in good repair, and Hilda Lindley added a bigger kitchen and deck to the house in the late 1960s.

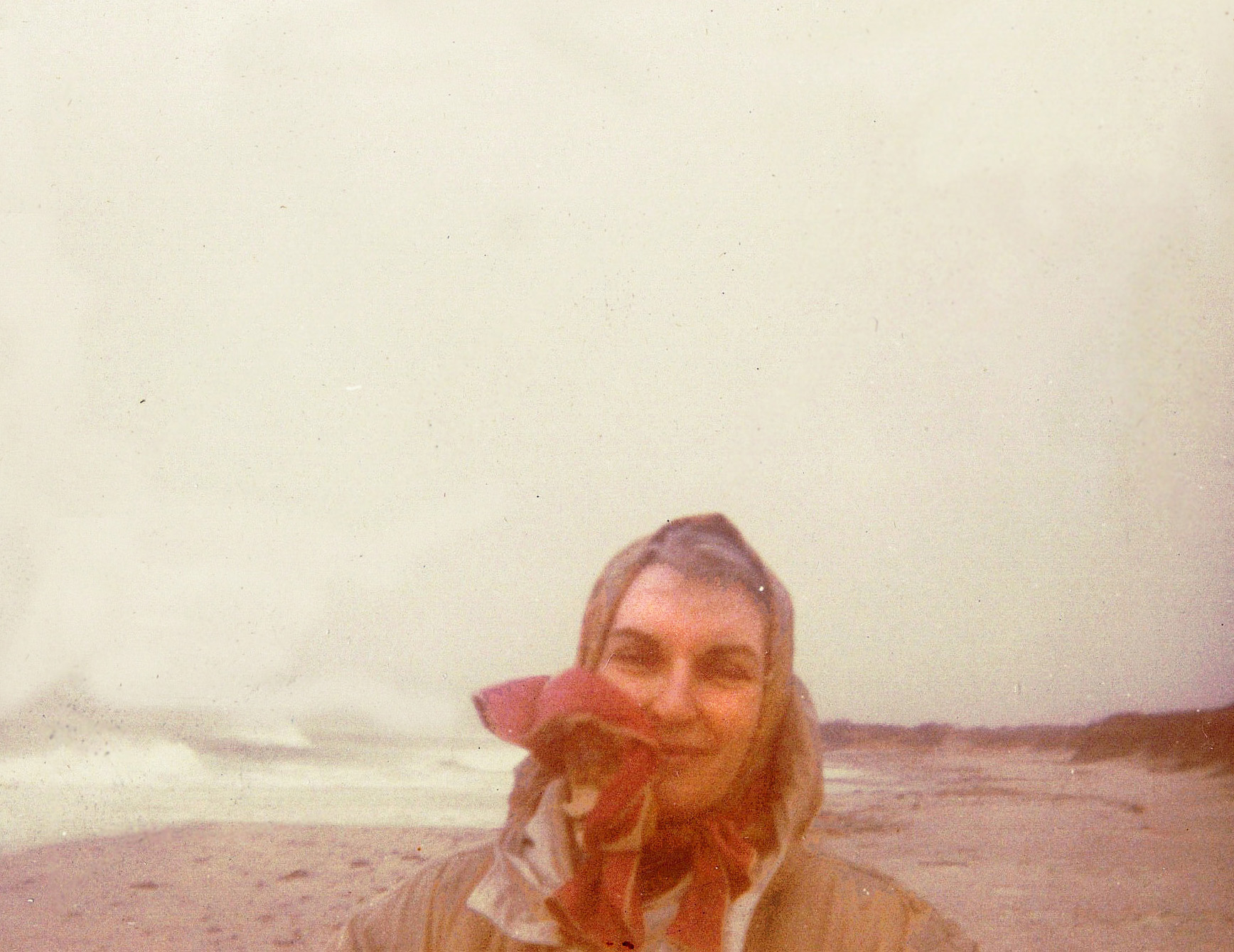
Hilda Lindley near Shagwong Point, Montauk, New York, 1970

In 1970, Eugene Haas Jr., chairman of the East Hampton Town Zoning Board of Appeals, proposed a plan to build up to 1,800 houses in Indian Field, or nearly two houses per acre. Among other things, he also proposed to cut a new harbor entrance through Little Reed Pond, which connects to the freshwater Big Reed Pond, to join the saltwater Lake Montauk, a busy sport and commercial fishing port, to Block Island Sound near Shagwong Point. The channel would have changed the salinity and biology of Big Reed Pond, later designated a National Natural Landmark after Indian Field was saved from development by Lindley and the CCOM.

Using newspaper advertisements, public meetings, and personal appeals, Hilda Lindley rallied friends and neighbors as upset about the development project as she was and formed the CCOM, which was to become the hamlet's leading environmental organization. The group began petitioning officials, from the federal government down through the state and local levels, to buy the land to preserve its open space, natural and cultural history, and, not least on a crowded island, the clean groundwater in the aquifer the undeveloped land helped protect.

The U.S. government and the State of New York turned down Lindley and the CCOM, refusing to purchase Indian Field. But in 1971, Suffolk County Executive John V.N. Klein approved a county purchase of Indian Field for parkland.

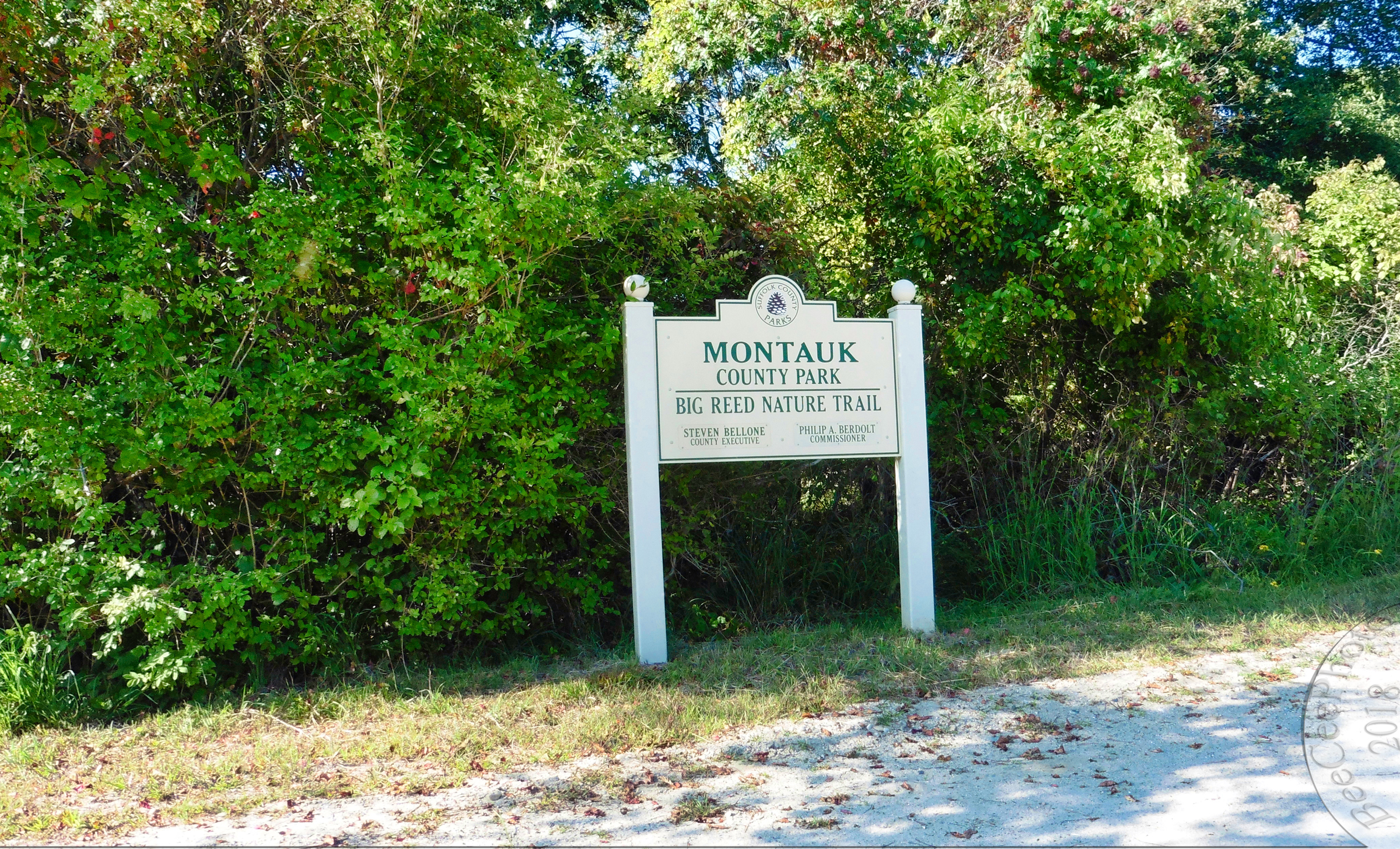
Montauk-County-Park-Nature-trail2017

The acquisition did not take place immediately, however. It was complicated by political maneuvering and by allegations of profiteering on the part of landowners on the perimeter of the proposed parkland, and by inflated appraisals of some private holdings slated for public purchase. It was not until November 1973 that the legislature and County Executive Klein approved final purchase of some 900 acres of parkland in Indian Field. The place was named Indian Field County Park. Later the name was changed to Montauk County Park and later still to Theodore Roosevelt County Park.

Although Hilda Lindley successfully spearheaded the effort to save Indian Field, she was ordered by Suffolk County to give up her house, under the threat of eminent domain. The demand that Lindley vacate the Hilda Lindley House was made by the Suffolk County Legislature, under the leadership of R. Thomas Strong, an East Hampton Republican and head of the legislature's parks committee, despite the opposition of County Executive (also a Republican) Klein and his suggestion that the Lindley House might be left out of the county acquisition. The county had no policy in place for eminent domain in such takings, and the parks committee, led by Strong, made her the first victim of a new policy, which was to seize land unconditionally. In fact, the taking of Lindley's house was viewed by many as a political act of revenge, because her successful effort to save Indian Field had challenged the local power structure and deprived developers and developer-friendly politicians of a chance to make a large amount of money developing Indian Field. Hilda Lindley continued to fight her eviction from her house, using lawyers and the press to wage a war of words and negotiating with Suffolk County representatives. She received support from, among others, Charles A. Lindbergh, the celebrated aviator, and William F. Buckley, the conservative columnist, who wrote an essay for Long Island's biggest newspaper, Newsday, from a libertarian standpoint berating the county for its behavior.

Negotiations dragged on, with agreements seemingly close and then falling apart. One of Lindley's lawyers, Hal Lary, pushed for a 99-year lease, saying such a term was typical in similar situations in other parkland purchases in other places. At other times, talks appeared ready to collapse completely, with the county threatening to evict Lindley summarily from her house. Finally, in February 1976, an agreement was reached, in which Lindley and her family retained the right to stay in their house for 35 years, at the end of which it was to be handed over to county government without compensation.

Hilda Lindley, who had remarried and taken the name of Hilda Lindley-Waller, died of breast cancer in December 1980. Her family continued to live in the house in Indian Field, maintaining it and occasionally aiding lost hikers, bikers, and horse riders who sometimes became disoriented in the county park's dense underbrush, swampy thickets, and winding trails.

In August 2010, Joseph Montuori, the Suffolk County Parks Commissioner under Steve Levy, a Republican, wrote a letter to the Lindleys ordering them to leave the house by February 2011. Suffolk County employees subsequently changed the lock on the gate leading to the house, preventing the Lindley family access to the Hilda Lindley House.

== Recent developments ==
The East Hampton Press, calling the Lindleys “good stewards,” proposed in an editorial in September 2010 that Suffolk County negotiate a lease with the Lindleys for 10 more years of their residency in the Hilda Lindley House. Later, Suffolk County Legislator Jay Schneiderman of Montauk proposed that the house be officially named the Hilda Lindley House, and the Suffolk County Legislature passed his bill in December 2010. In February 2011, the Montauk Citizens Advisory Committee unanimously passed a resolution asking the county to keep the Lindleys in the Hilda Lindley House.

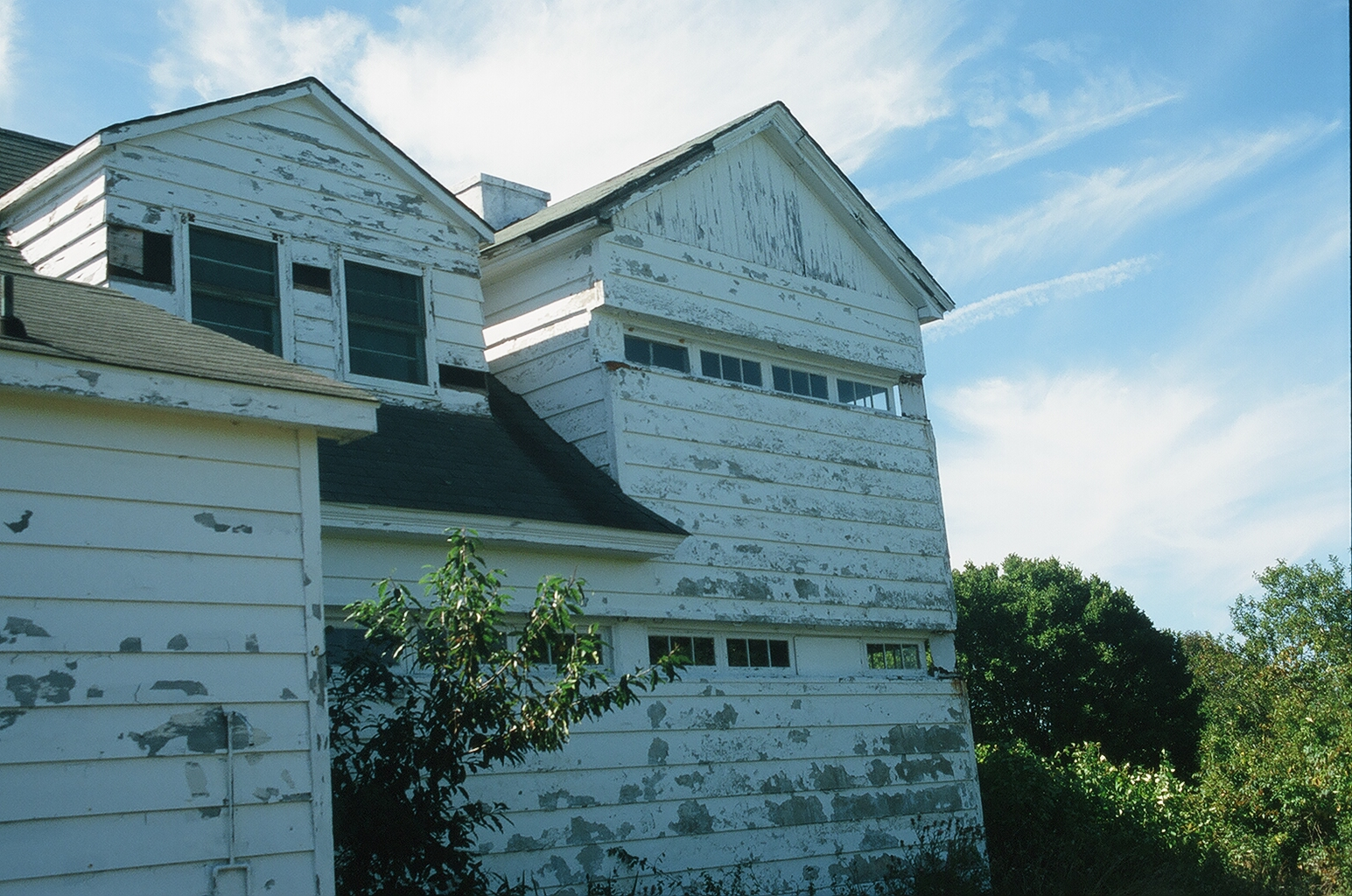
Hilda Lindley House, October 2015

The Suffolk County parks department, however, under the leadership of Greg Dawson, a Republican appointed by County Executive Bellone, a Democrat who had succeeded County Executive Levy, continued to let the house deteriorate. In February 2014, County Legislator Schneiderman introduced legislation in the Suffolk legislature ordering the county parks department “to develop a plan for the care and use” of the Hilda Lindley House. The legislature passed the bill, and County Executive Bellone signed it into law.

As of February 2015, however, the Lindley family's offer to renew the lease, maintain the house in a caretaker capacity, or reach some other agreement with Suffolk County to ensure preservation of this historic structure had not been accepted. The house remained alone and uncared for, paint peeling off its walls and weeds growing in its yard.

Vandalism and break-ins had occurred, and windows had been broken, but Suffolk County officials and employees had done little or nothing to repair the damage, protect the house, or come up with a plan for saving it, despite pleas from the Lindleys and the Montauk community. Parks Commissioner Dawson told the East Hampton Star he didn't know when his department would come up with a plan for the house.

=== See also ===
Poggatacut (sachem)
