= Azurest South =

Historic house in Virginia, United States

- U.S. National Register of Historic Places
- U.S. National Historic Landmark
- Virginia Landmarks Register
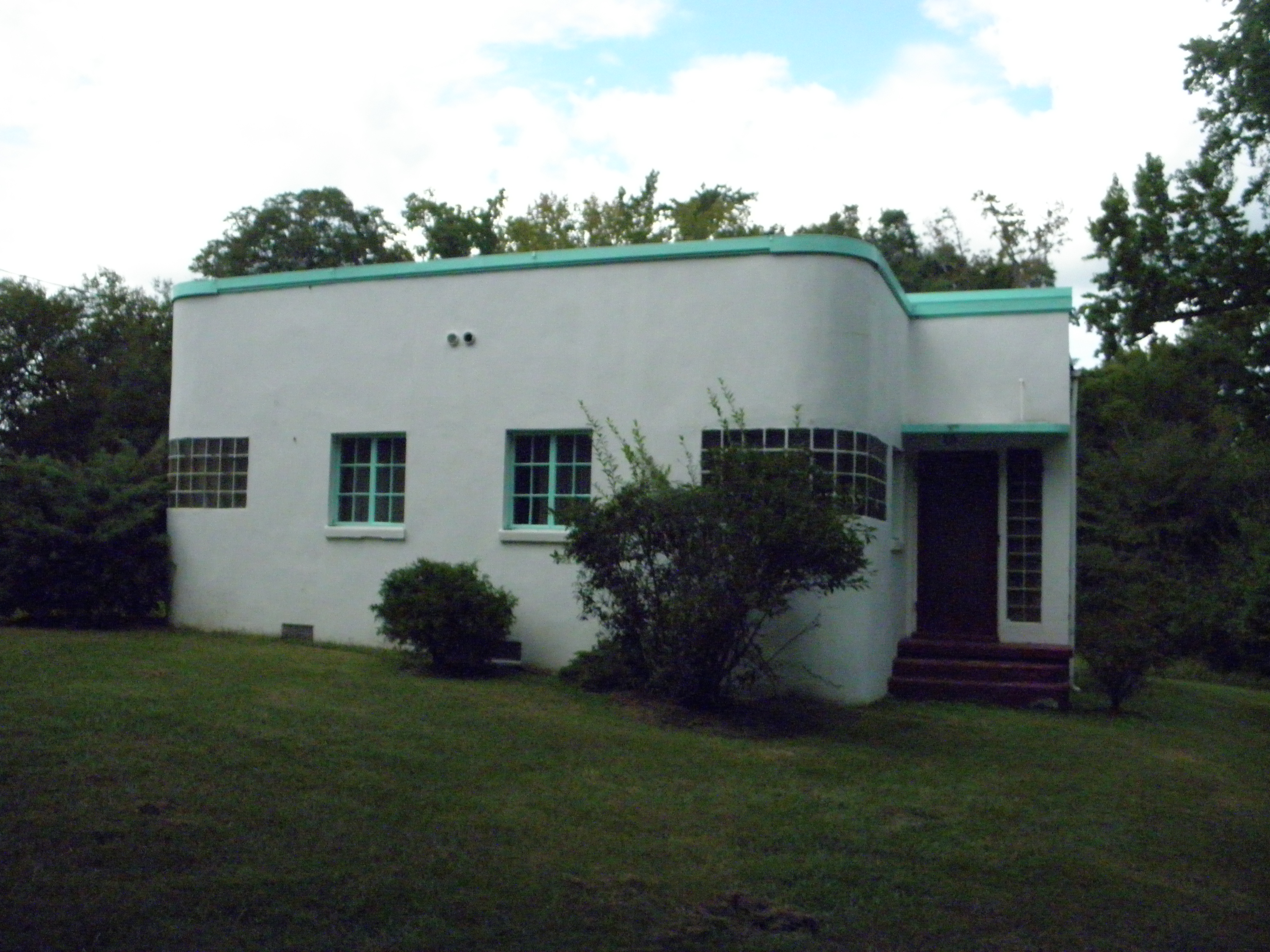

- Location within Virginia Location within the United States
- Location: 2900 Boisseau St. Ettrick, VA 23803
- Coordinates: 37°14′26″N 77°25′02″W
- Area: 2 acres (0.81 ha)
- Built: 1938
- Architect: Meredith, Amaza Lee; Holmes, Russell
- Architectural style: International Style
- NRHP reference No.: 93001464 (NRHP nomination); 100011351 (NHL designation)
- VLR No.: 020-5583

Significant dates
- Added to NRHP: December 30, 1993
- Designated NHL: December 13, 2024
- Designated VLR: October 20, 1993

Azurest South was the home and workplace of Amaza Lee Meredith, one of the nation's first black female architects. Located on the campus of Virginia State University, the home is one of the few examples of the Post World War I German style: International Style in Virginia. She shared the home with her partner, Dr. Edna Meade Colson, who served as dean of the Virginia State University School of Education. Meredith founded Virginia State University's fine arts department in 1930. When Meredith died, she left half of the property's interest to the Virginia State University National Alumni Association, and after Colson's death, the association purchased the other half of the estate.

It was listed on the National Register of Historic Places in 1993, and was designated a National Historic Landmark in 2024.

Azurest South displays "a fascination with modernity, a familiarity with new materials and construction details, and a love of nature." The building is located in a dell on the eastern edge of campus. The exterior consists of white stucco concrete blocks, while the interior incorporates reds and blues, creating a sense of "playfulness." The kitchen used to feature colored mosaic tiles. They were removed at some point after 1984, but the Virginia State University Alumni Association hopes to restore them.
