= Amaza Lee Meredith =

American architect

- Born: August 14, 1895; Lynchburg, Virginia, U.S.
- Died: 1984 (aged 89)
- Resting place: Eastview Cemetery, Petersburg, Virginia, U.S.
- Education: Virginia State University, Columbia University
- Partner: Edna Meade Colson

Amaza Lee Meredith (August 14, 1895 – 1984) was an American architect, educator and artist. Meredith was unable to enter the profession as an architect because of "both her race and her sex" as an African-American woman, and worked primarily as an art teacher at Virginia State University (then Virginia State College / Virginia Normal and Industrial Institute), where she founded the art department. Sex and race wasn't the only factor that was challenging at the time. Amaza Lee Meredith lived authentically as an African-American Queer artist despite at the time heterosexual norms. She is best known for her residence, Azurest South, where she and her partner, Dr. Edna Meade Colson, resided together. Moreover, she co-founded the Azurest Syndicate Inc., a vacation destination for black middle class Americans on Sag Harbor, New York. As an educated black woman, Meredith is a rare example of a financially and socially independent black woman living in the time of Jim Crow Segregation Laws.

== Early life and family ==
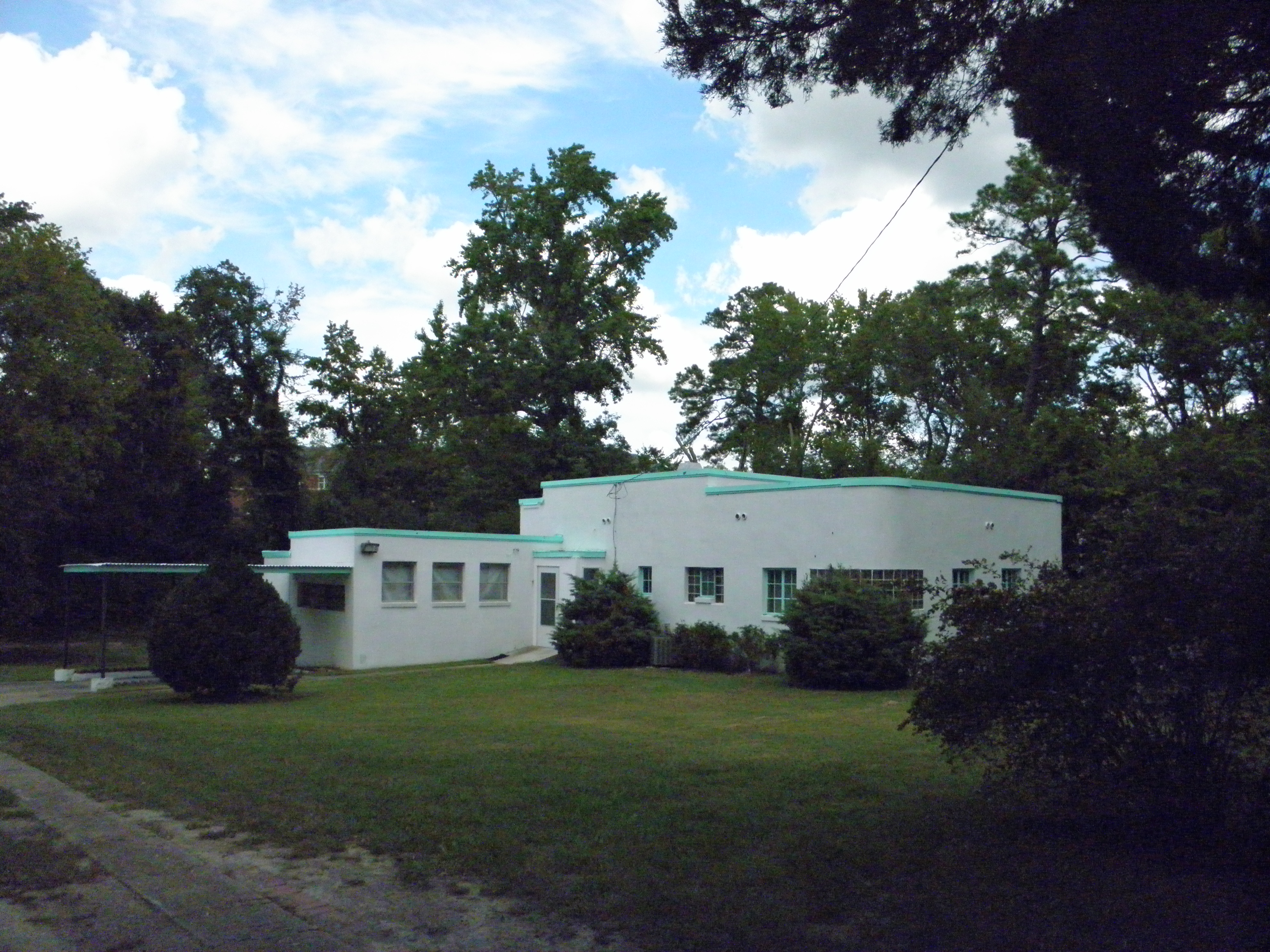
Azurest South

Meredith was born in Lynchburg, Virginia as a daughter of Samuel Peter Meredith and Emma Pink Kenney. She had three siblings, two sisters and a brother. Meredith maintained a lifelong good relationship with her older sister Maude. Samuel, Amaza's father, was a carpenter, and Emma, her mother, was a seamstress. Her father was white and her mother was black. Her parents were prohibited by anti-miscegenation laws from marrying in Virginia. In Amaza Lee Meredith's birth certificate, she is only identified as Emma Kenney's daughter. The name of the father is left out. Nevertheless, Samuel Meredith cared about his family and built them a house in which he moved in as well some years later. He also supported them financially. Eventually, her parents travelled to Washington, D.C. in racially separated railroad-cars to get married and finally moved in together afterwards. Not long after that, her father began to lose business as a result of the controversial marriage and was soon in debt. He committed suicide in 1915.

Despite the difficulties of being an interracial family in the era of segregation, both parents had a great influence on Meredith. Her carpenter father taught her how to draw blueprints and built models. He instilled in her the wish to become an architect. Her mother, who worked as a seamstress before having her children, believed education was the key against racist public opinion. Amaza's mother was relatively highly educated herself. She was a convincing, engaged woman and she built a local network of support at Lynchburg's Eight Street Baptist church, which was a center for female political and social activities. She supported her children's education by sending them to college. It was there when Amaza Lee Meredith met her future companion, Dr. Edna Meade Colson, with whom she held correspondence during her entire vocational education and later moved in with in their shared home "Azurest South". Although it is not quite clear (and not very likely given the time they lived in) whether they lived as an openly homosexual couple, it is safe to say their relationship was committed and loving. Both Meredith and Colson were honorary members of the Gillfield Baptist Church. They lived together until Meredith died in 1984 and are buried alongside each other in Petersburg, Virginia, at Eastview Cemetery.

== Education ==
Amaza Lee Meredith's educational journey started with her attending the Lynchburg elementary public schools. After that she attended Jackson High School (which was demolished in 1970.) She graduated at the top of her class in 1915, despite suffering the loss of her father that year. Determined to gain her teaching credentials she attended Virginia Normal and Industrial Institute (Now Virginia State University). It was in her first year that she met Dr. Edna Meade Colson who had an influence on Meredith's education through supporting her with advice and recommending pedagogical literature. Meredith finally got her "Summer School Professional Certificate" for teachers. Now being able to teach elementary school, she took her first teaching job and returned to Petersburg in 1922 to earn her teaching degree. This time she was the valedictorian of her class at Virginia Normal and Industrial Institute.

In 1926 she moved to New York City, where she lived together with her sister in North Harlem. She attended the teachers college at Columbia University to study fine arts and art appreciation and received a bachelor's degree in 1930. Among others, she took classes in interior design and home decoration and attended lectures, discussions, practical work and trips to museums which shaped her understanding of a modern design approach. During this time she also came in contact with the new negro movement and grew into it as a young, educated black woman who disagreed with the existing stereotypes. Moreover, she qualified herself as a member of the talented tenth, which after W.E.B. Du Bois was a group of culturally, socially and scientifically educated black Americans who would serve as sort of a mediator between blacks of lower education and the white society. She returned to New York to gain her master's degree at Columbia University in 1934.

== Career ==
=== Career in education ===
After she completed the "Summer School Certificate," Meredith started teaching in a one-room schoolhouse in Botetourt County, Virginia, called the Indian Rock. She spent two years in the village despite the fact that she found the circumstances alarmingly bad, and the black community "dispossessed, disenfranchise and complacent." Here she built the Parents-Teachers-Association, which worked in association with the Negro Organization Society of Virginia and was meant to improve the schools situation. Later, she went back to Lynchburg and taught elementary school, before returning to college. Upon graduating in 1922 she taught mathematics at Dunbar High School in Botetourt County for six years. After earning her bachelor's degree she returned to Virginia where she was hired by the then president of the Virginia Normal and Industrial Institute to teach art. In 1935, after returning to Virginia with her master's degree, she founded the arts department of Virginia State University and became the department chair, which she remained until her retirement in 1958. The art education Meredith taught was based on learning graphic design, fine arts and the principles of architecture. Furthermore, she successfully established two art scholarships and was an active part of the Alumni Association.

One of her students, Stafford W. Evans, became during World War II staff illustrator of The Mananan, the base newsletter for Manana Barracks at Pearl Harbor. Manana was the largest posting of African-American servicemen in the world, but prior to his arrival there, he was alone in a Jim Crow Navy that he describes to Meredith in sometimes chilling details. His extensive correspondence with Meredith, whom he considered his adoptive mother, is collected in her papers at Virginia State University. One of Evans' students at Armstrong High School in Richmond was Benjamin Leroy Wigfall.

=== Career in architecture ===
Meredith's commitment to her family, friends, and the advancement of Black cultural equity was a guiding thread throughout her career. Meredith received Virginia's first land grant for African American scholars. Despite the fact that Amaza was never a registered architect, she was one of just a few black architects in practice at the time, and one of the country's few female black architects. (On the basis of the 1910 U.S. Census, only 59 black architects and 47 black draftsmen were employed.) The fact that most of Meredith's historical work has been lost, Virginia State University continues to honor her famous achievements. While her exact number of works is unknown, Amaza has been attributed with architectural design for houses in Virginia, Texas, and New York. The most prominent of them are two mansions in Azurest North. Despite having no formal training in architecture, Meredith designed many homes for her family and friends in Virginia, New York and Texas. Her first building was Azurest South, which was completed in 1939 and was designed completely by Meredith in the International Style. She and her partner, Colson, moved in together after its completion and it would be their primary residence for the rest of their lives. Azurest South, demonstrates her fascination with the avant-garde design, her familiarity with modern materials and construction details, and her courage in expressing non-traditional ideas in the public eye of the state's first land grant college for African Americans.

Azurest South is considered a rare example of the International Style in Virginia and displays her interest in avant-garde design. Meredith also used Azurest South as her own art studio. She was active in documenting her lifestyle and accomplishments at Azurest through photographs. The archived documentation and remains of Azurest have inspired intersectional research on race, queerness, and spatial design during the Jim Crow Era. Also, she used her aesthetic and artistic talent to coordinate color schemes and draw blueprints for several campus buildings. For example, she worked with the Alumni House Committee from 1949 on in proposing the creation of an Alumni House. After her proposals were turned down, she decided to give half of Azurest South to the Alumni Association after her death, hoping it would be used as an Alumni House, as it actually is today. Meredith also worked as an advisor of interior decoration on the local better homes Committee. Azurest South became the home of the Virginia State University National Alumni Association in 1986, and the building was added to the National Register of Historic Places in 1993.

In 1947, Meredith started developing a 120 lot subdivision in Sag Harbor called Azurest North together with her older sister Maude. Azurest North was created as a vacation destination for middle class African Americans. In order to develop Azurest North, the two sisters and other developers formed a group, called Azurest Syndicate, which worked to create an African American leisure community. Lots were sold to investors who built cottages in Sag Harbor. Meredith designed at least two of these cottages. Terry Cottage, which belonged to her sister Maude Terry and was built in 1949 was designed with similar formal aspects to Azurest South. Edendot, which belonged to her friends Ed and Dot Spaulding, was a Prairie Style building. Following her retirement, she took a post as the official secretary of the Azurest Syndicate Inc.

=== Other achievements ===
Meredith was also an inventor. In 1955, she received a patent for an accessory to be attached to a golf bag. Also, she developed the "Kant Drop", a top that can be attached to any recyclable container. She continued to design buildings and paint throughout the 1960s. Some of her artwork was exhibited in the Virginia Museum of Fine Arts and galleries in New York and North Carolina, some is still displayed in the Gillfield Baptist Church or hangs in residents’ homes. In the 1970s, Meredith designed logos to be used as a proposed name change for the National Association for the Advancement of Colored People (NAACP). She created more than a dozen scrapbooks, devoting each to a different subject and/or person. They contain documents, photos, letters, news clippings, and ephemera, which combine to form a rich source of research on their topics. The materials cut across all the other sub-series in these collections.

== Legacy ==
Amaza Lee Meredith continues to gain recognition among new audiences. Azurest South was documented during Women's Month 2001 by the National Register of Historic Places. In describing this woman's talents, Azurest South was called a “significant landmark of African-American material culture and design.” The Virginia Department of Historic Resources dedicated a historical marker to Meredith in 2008, located at Azurest South. Meredith was named one of the Library of Virginia's African American Trailblazers in 2009, now represented on the Virginia Changemakers website. In 2018, the Virginia Capitol Foundation announced that Meredith's name would be on the Virginia Women's Monument's glass Wall of Honor.

Meredith's work became more widely recognized through Jacqueline Taylor's 2023 biography "Amaza Lee Meredith Imagines Herself Modern: Architecture and the Black American Middle Class," published by MIT Press. In "Dear Mazie," the Institute for Contemporary Art at Virginia Commonwealth University curator Amber Esseiva invited contemporary artists to respond to Meredith's legacy, as recorded in her extensive correspondence, now housed in the Virginia State University archives. Solange Knowles and Saint Heron published a research journal titled "Azurest Blue: The Life and Legacy of Amaza Lee Meredith" in 2025, featuring five essays on her life and work as well as reproductions of archival documents, such as blueprints, photographs, and letters.

== Works ==
- Amaza Lee Meredith, Edna Meade Colson “Azurest South”, 1939, Ettrick Virginia
- Richards, Dr. F.F. “Hillside”, 1946, Sag Harbor NY
- Virginia State University Alumni House, 1949, Ettrick Virginia – plan only
- Spaulding, Dorothy “Edendot”, 1951, Sag Harbor NY
- Terry, Maude “HIHIL”, Sag Harbor NY
- Johnson, Dr. James H, 1954, Ettrick, Virginia
- Preston, Ann C. “Anndot”, 1956, Prairie View
- Gillfield Baptist Church Education Building, 1964, Petersburg Virginia
- Parker, Evelyn L., 1975 - Plans only
- Reed, Ettrick – Plans only
