= Poggatacut =

Poggatacut (c. 1568 – 1651) also known as Youghco or Poggatticut, was sachem of the Manhasset Indian people of Shelter Island, New York and elder brother to Montaukett Sachem Wyandanch. Sachem Poggatacut and his wife Aswaw granted possession to Lion Gardiner for Gardiners Island in 1639. It was conveyed when they deeded Manchonat, an Island between the north and south fork in exchange for goods and alliance. By 1644 he had united the Corchaug, Shinnecock, Manhassets and Montaukett before retreating as Grand Sachem to his redoubt on Shelter Island, relinquishing control over the tribes to his younger brother, sachem Wyandanch. As “Sachem of Paumanacke", as Long Island was called, he was empowered to make treaties for the Montauketts.

== Early life ==
Son of Mongotucksee Longknife, Sachem of Montaukett (1550-1595) and Quashawan, of the Mohawk and Montauk Tribes (1556-1600), his 27 siblings constituted a royal family that had rivals as far away as the Narragansetts of Connecticut. The Montauk Tribe of Indians were tributary or allied to the Pequots, the Narragansetts enemies.

== Pequot War ==
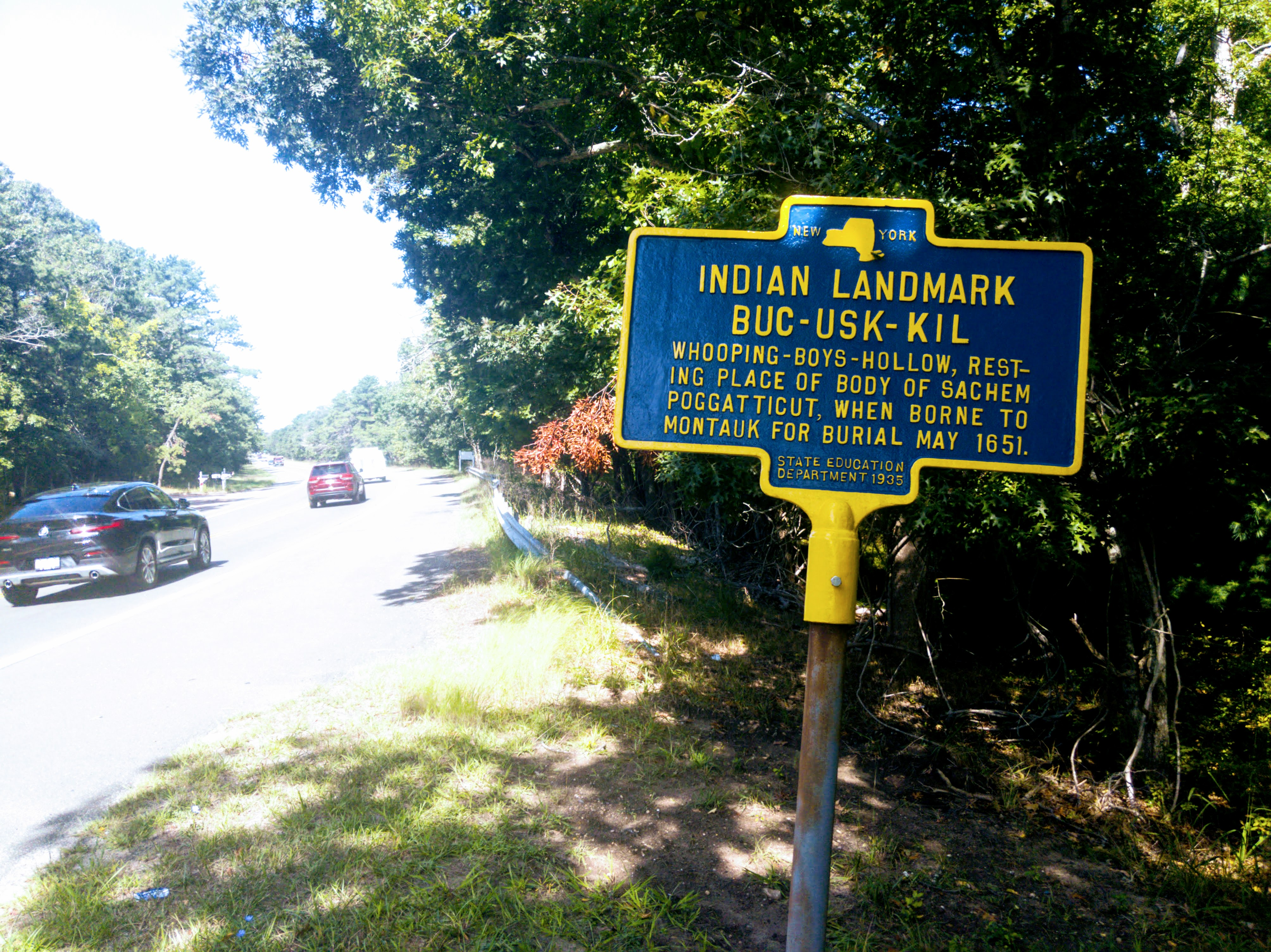
Resting place of Sachem Poggatacut, also known as Sachem's hole

The end of the Pequot war (1636–38) saw the Pequots decimated as the toll of contact with the Europeans via the fur trade and superior numbers of Narragansetts ended their dominance on Long Island. With the Narragansetts set to eradicate the Montaukett tribe, Poggatacut sought to ally with the settlers and Gardiner. By 1648 he was Sachem of Shelter Island and travelled from his residence on Sachem’s Neck to visit with the other tribes. It was on one of these visits that he died in 1651. His funeral train bore his body back to Montauk and stopped at Buc-Usk-Kil, a place on the road from Sag Harbor to East Hampton. Indian lore has that where his head rested there was a shallow hole in the ground, approximately 1 1/2 feet deep, later called the Sachem's hole, which for passing Indians became a sacred place. For 200 years passing tribes would stop and remove the twigs and leaves that had fallen into the hole; until the 1950s when the roadway (E Hampton-Sag Harbor turnpike/ NY 114) was widened and the sachems hole obliterated.

By 1663 East Hampton had passed laws prohibiting Indians from the town due to the smallpox plague that ravished the Montauketts. Grand sachem Wyandanch had united 13 tribes and moved the tribe off the Indian fields to gain the safety that being closer to the whites entailed. By the end of the 1800's barely 10-15 families were left on the east end.

== Buc-Usk-Kil ==
In 2001 East Hampton trustees created the Buckskill Nature Preserve, consisting of 140 acres belonging to the town and 170 acres of Suffolk county owned pine barrens. The town found preservation of the water table beneath the barrens to be beneficial to town water recharge ability and the water supply. Buc-Usk-Kil is the Algonquin word for 'resting place', the starting point for the nature preserve is between Stephen Hands Path and Daniels Hole Road on NY 114.

== See also ==
- The Poggatticut Hotel fire on Shelter Island.

Northwest Alliance
