= Henry Arthur Callis =

American physician

- Born: January 14, 1887; Rochester, New York, U.S.
- Died: November 12, 1974 (aged 87); Washington, D.C., U.S.
- Education: Cornell University; Rush Medical College
- Known for: Co-founder of Alpha Phi Alpha fraternity at Cornell University
- Spouse(s): Alice Dunbar Nelson(m. 1910, div.); Myra Colson Callis(m. 1927)

Henry Arthur Callis (January 14, 1887 – November 12, 1974) was a physician and one of the seven founders (commonly referred to as The Seven Jewels) of Alpha Phi Alpha fraternity at Cornell University in 1906. Callis co-authored the fraternity name with George Kelley and became the only Jewel to become general president of the fraternity (1915). Callis assisted in the organization of several chapters, including Xi Lambda Chapter (1924) in Chicago and Alpha Nu Lambda (1928) in Tuskegee, AL.

== Biography ==
Callis was born in Rochester, New York, and attended Cornell University and Rush Medical College. He became a physician and worked as a medical consultant at the Veterans' Hospital in Tuskegee, Alabama. He was professor of medicine at Howard University and a frequent contributor to medical journals.

Callis in 1940 was the first African American selected to be a diplomate of the American Board of Internal Medicine.

The Eta Tau Lambda chapter of Alpha Phi Alpha created Alpha Phi Alpha Homes Inc. to address housing for low-income families, individuals and senior citizens in Akron, Ohio. In 1971, Alpha Homes received an $11.5 million grant from HUD to begin groundbreaking on Channelwood Village with the Henry Arthur Callis Tower as its centerpiece.

Callis died on November 12, 1974, in Washington, D.C. His death was a milestone for the fraternity as Callis became the last Jewel to enter its Omega Chapter—distinguished to contain the names of deceased fraternity members, and the Alpha Phi Alpha entered a period when it had no living "Jewels". The Callis Papers - personal and family papers of Henry Callis including awards, certificates, clippings, correspondence, a diary, notebooks, photographs, programs and scrapbooks relating to Callis and his family - were donated to Howard University's Moorland-Spingarn Research Center.

== Personal life ==
Callis was the second husband of poet Alice Dunbar; their marriage ended in divorce. His third wife was social worker, employment specialist Myra Colson Callis; they married in 1927, and she survived him. He had two daughters, Jane and Helen.

Preceded by Henry A. Dickason	General President of Alpha Phi Alpha; 1915	Succeeded by Howard H. Long
