= Northwest Alliance =

Activist organization advocating for unoccupied land parcels

- Region served: East Hampton (town), New York

The Northwest Alliance is a New York state based organization of citizens formed in the early 1980s whose goal was to gain protection of two unoccupied parcels of East Hampton, Long Island, comprising The Grace Estate, Barcelona Neck, Northwest Creek, Little Northwest Creek and Northwest Harbor.

== History ==
The early activists group, Cathy and Tom Lester, Stuart Vorpahl, Arnold Leo, Helena Curtis and other concerned south fork residents pushed for the town to acquire both land parcels. This acquisition gained protection of the Sag Harbor side of Northwest Creek and the body of the southeastern shore of Northwest Harbor to Little Northwest Creek. They picked up the reins left by Nancy Boyd Willey (1902-1998), whose Old Sagg-Harbour Committee and the Sag Harbor Conservation and Planning Alliance (CAPA) saved Little Northwest Creek and wetlands from developers in 1974, and preserved Barcelona Neck.

The Paumanok Path winds through the Northwest harbor, where a ghost town and pastures were once part of East Hamptons early history prior to the advent of Sag Harbor's deeper port.

In 1993 a brown tide remnant affected Northwest harbor causing a gradual deterioration of the water quality and a die-off of shellfish and waterlife in Northwest creek. The marine nursery of wide eelgrass beds that protected the overall Creek vitality was in decline. Hoping that dredging the outlet to the harbor would improve water quality, the newly formed Northwest Creek Task Force pressed for dredging to expand the tidal flush from the Creek. Dredging was begun in 1995 and repeated roughly every three years since then.

In 2003, the group, renamed the Northwest Alliance, expanded its protective role over the Northwest area by attending meetings of the Community Preservation Fund Committee and the Harbor Management Committee of the East Hampton Trustees. They also teamed up with Suffolk Country Vector Control Citizens Action Committee and also the East Hampton Citizens Action Committee in becoming a vocal proponent of the environmental policy discussions being held over wetlands, land use and water protection issues.

== Programs ==
=== Town committee ===
In 2007, The Northwest Alliance formed the Northwest Comprehensive Coordinating Committee (NCCC) to unite all the government departments and interested private organizations whose purview was the Northwest Creek area. Due to overlapping jurisdictions covering the Northwest harbor area, there was difficulty getting the town to authorize dredging for environmental reasons, while dredging for navigation was being done by the county. The water quality had continued to decline and the NCCC set guidelines for going forward.

=== Alliance ===
The Alliance developed policy recommendations for state initiatives, including scientific study of the problems, the continued public acquisition of unoccupied parcels in wetlands, protection of aquifers and other sensitive watershed areas. They also developed a habitat restoration plan for Phragmite abatement, also hydrologically effective dredging and eel grass planting. A growing concern by 2009 was the proliferation of helicopters to the east end.

The Alliance commenced to work in close partnership with New York state, Suffolk county, and East Hampton town government and other private environmental organizations to cleanup and protect the Northwest Creek and surrounding ecosystem to the benefit of the community.

=== Environmental Policy Questionnaire ===
In September 2013, the NCCC posed three questions to candidates for East Hampton Town Board and Supervisor. The concerns were water quality, the Northwest creek sandbar and noise pollution caused by the approaches to the East Hampton airport.

=== Honors ===
On December 2, 2005, the East Hampton town board adopted Resolution 1524, renaming the Soak Hides Dreen as the Cathy Lester Nature Preserve, honoring the environmental activism of the former town Supervisor.

== See also ==
- Hilda Lindley
- Renee V. H. Simons
- Nancy (Boyd) Willey
