= The East Hampton Star =

- Type: Weekly newspaper
- Owner: Rattray family
- Founder: George Burling
- Publisher: Helen S. Rattray
- Editor: David E. Rattray
- Founded: 1885; 140 years ago
- Language: English
- Headquarters: 153 Main Street; East Hampton, New York
- OCLC number: 04954053
- Website: easthamptonstar.com

The East Hampton Star is a weekly, privately owned newspaper published each Thursday in East Hampton, New York. It is one of the few independent, family-owned newspapers still existing in the United States. The owners live in East Hampton Town.

The newspaper was founded by George Burling in 1885. His naming of the paper, using East Hampton as two words, created the modern spelling of the town's name. (It had been one word, "Easthampton", similar to neighboring Southampton.)

The Boughton family started publishing the paper in 1890 when Edward S. Boughton became publisher. It stayed in that family until 1935 when the Rattray family under Arnold E. Rattray began publishing it. Five members of the Rattray family have run the paper: Arnold, Jeannette, Everett (their son), Helen S. Rattray (who has been publisher since 1980) and David E. Rattray, the current editor. Jennifer Landes is the arts editor.

The broadsheet is regularly filled with several pages of letters to the editor, because of its policy to publish "every letter to the editor it receives exclusively, with the exception of those sent anonymously, or those judged to be proselytizing, an invasion of privacy, libelous, or obscene." It is one of the first and only newspapers in the nation to print all letters received (that meet these requirements). The paper has reported on emerging issues surrounding development, land preservation, and historic preservation, and it contributes to East Hampton's level of civic activism and engagement in these matters.
