= Freetown (East Hampton) =

Hamlet in New York, United States

Freetown is an unincorporated hamlet in the Town of East Hampton, NY, settled in the 19th century by free people of African and Native American descent, as well as people of European descent. Freetown retained its multicultural character throughout the 20th century, evolving into a largely working-class neighborhood occupied by East Hampton's labor force. During the 2010s and 2020s, surviving historic properties in Freetown are increasingly threatened by demolition and intensive redevelopment to make way for luxury real estate and other out-of-scale and out-of-character new construction.

In the early 19th century, following the passage of New York State's Gradual Emancipation Act of 1799, John Lyon Gardiner and other wealthy local slaveowners set aside portions of their extensive landholdings in what is now Freetown to sell or allocate for their African American and indigenous workers. The land they chose was unsuitable for agriculture, but conveniently situated along main roadways connecting to wealthy residential areas, farmlands, local businesses, and shipping ports like Northwest Harbor. Nineteen free households of color were listed in the 1810 Federal Census with 76 free people of color total. Some of Freetown's pioneering households of color endured for decades, as documented by Federal Censuses between 1810 and 1840. Some residents of color owned their own property, however, many others rented. Although Freetown was largely inhabited by people of color, East Hampton's elite white residents continued to own the majority of the property.

Freetown continued to grow as a multicultural community during the late 19th century. In 1879, a New York City real estate developer, Arthur W. Benson, acquired 10,000 acres (40 km^{2}) in Montauk, New York, where a group of Montaukett people maintained a small community. Benson and local officials relocated the Montaukett households to Freetown, offering them cash and deeds to newly subdivided lots.

Many direct connections to Freetown's past survive today. Archival records about the community of Freetown are preserved in East Hampton Library's extensive Long Island Collection. Oral histories and living memories are also plentiful. Moreover, a number of historic and culturally significant buildings and sites survive. For example, the George and Sara Fowler House, St. Matthews Chapel, and the Neighborhood House.
