= Paumanok Path =

Hiking trail in New York, United States

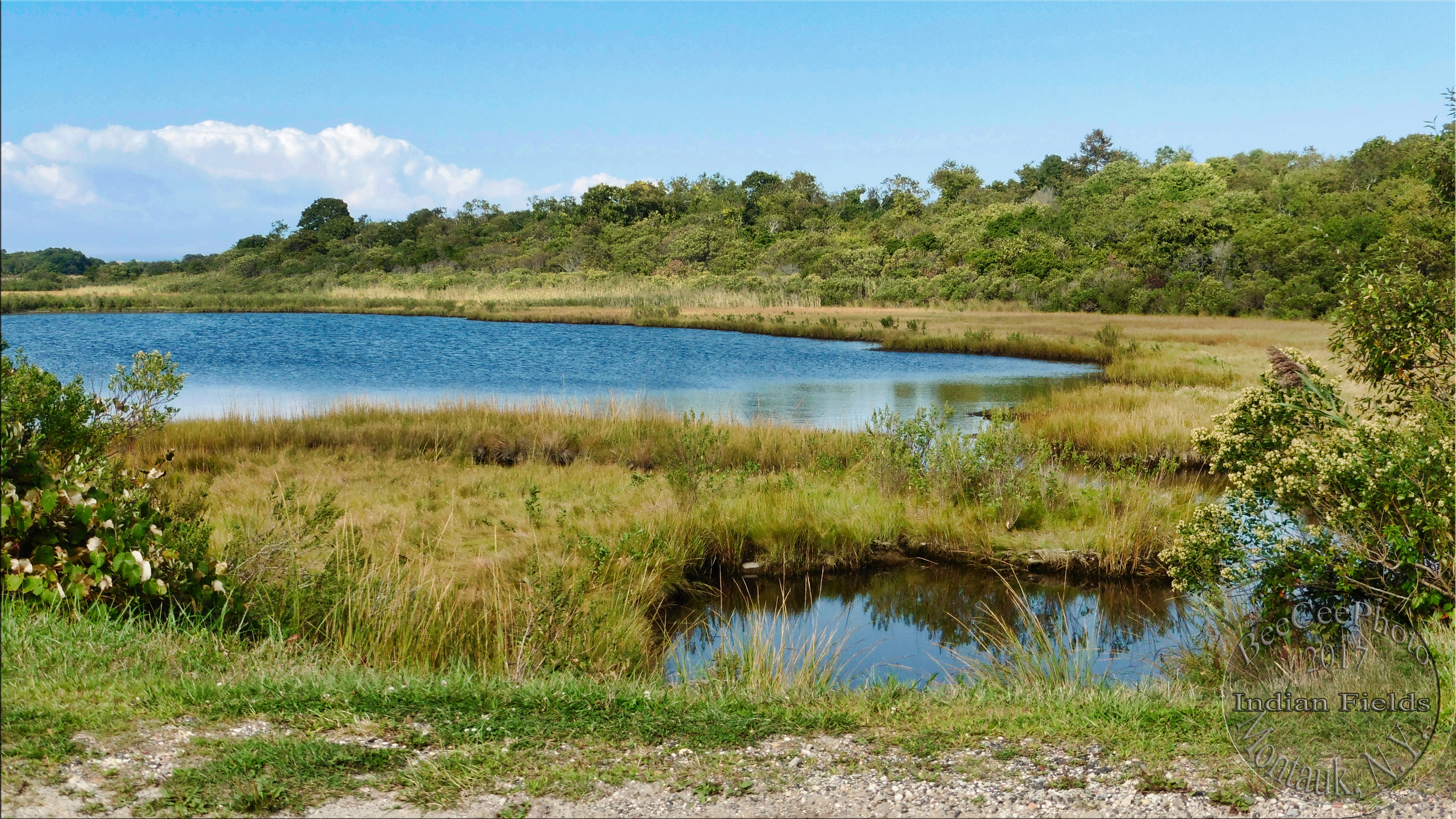
- Big Reed nature trail, Montauk

- Location within New York
- Location: NY 25A., Rocky Point, New York
- Coordinates: 40°56′40″N 72°56′55″W

The Paumanok Path is a 125-mile (201 km) hiking trail in New York on Long Island that goes from Rocky Point to Montauk Point State Park. It travels through four towns in Suffolk County: Brookhaven, Riverhead, Southampton and East Hampton. It is marked by white trail blazes.

== Description ==
The trail derives its name from the Native American name for Long Island. The trail was inspired by Stephen Talkhouse, a 19th-century Montaukett Indian famed for his 25-30 mile roundtrip walks from Montauk to East Hampton, New York and Sag Harbor, New York. Landmarks on the trail are said to be resting places for him. Talkhouse is buried off the trail in Theodore Roosevelt County Park near Montauk.

The trail is almost completely off-road, but there are a few short sections which are paved. There are gaps that total 20-odd miles that due to private ownership presented a challenge to overall completion until 2016.

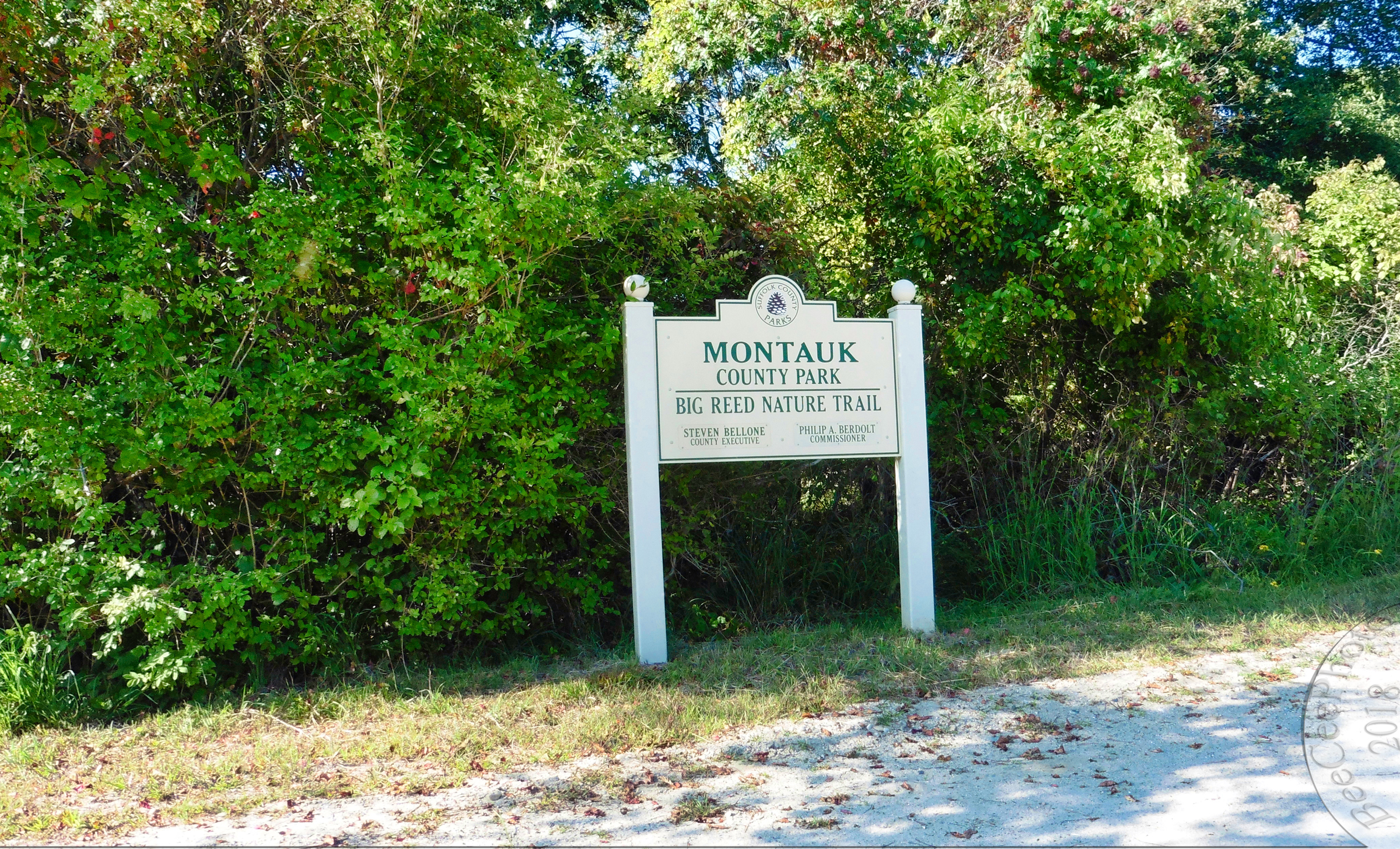
Montauk County Park in Indian Fields, Montauk, NY

== Activities ==
In October 2000, Byron Lane, an ultramarathon runner from Stony Brook, New York, who has Montaukett Indians in his family tree, ran the entire Paumanok Path as a fundraiser and awareness raiser for the trail. The path was altered since then and in 2016 hiker Joe Denny became the first to walk the 125-mile path. In 2021, Justin Kousky recorded a new fastest known time of 25 hours, 42 minutes.

The Paumonok path is a hiking trail with prohibitions for ATV's (Quads) and dirt bikes, however, a portion from East Hampton to Sag Harbor has been designated a bike trail, where mountain bikes are allowed. This section runs from Town Line road to the Sag Harbor turnpike (State road 114) where it lies opposite the trailhead for the Northwest Woods Trails.
