= Montauk County Park =

County park in Montauk, Suffolk County, New York

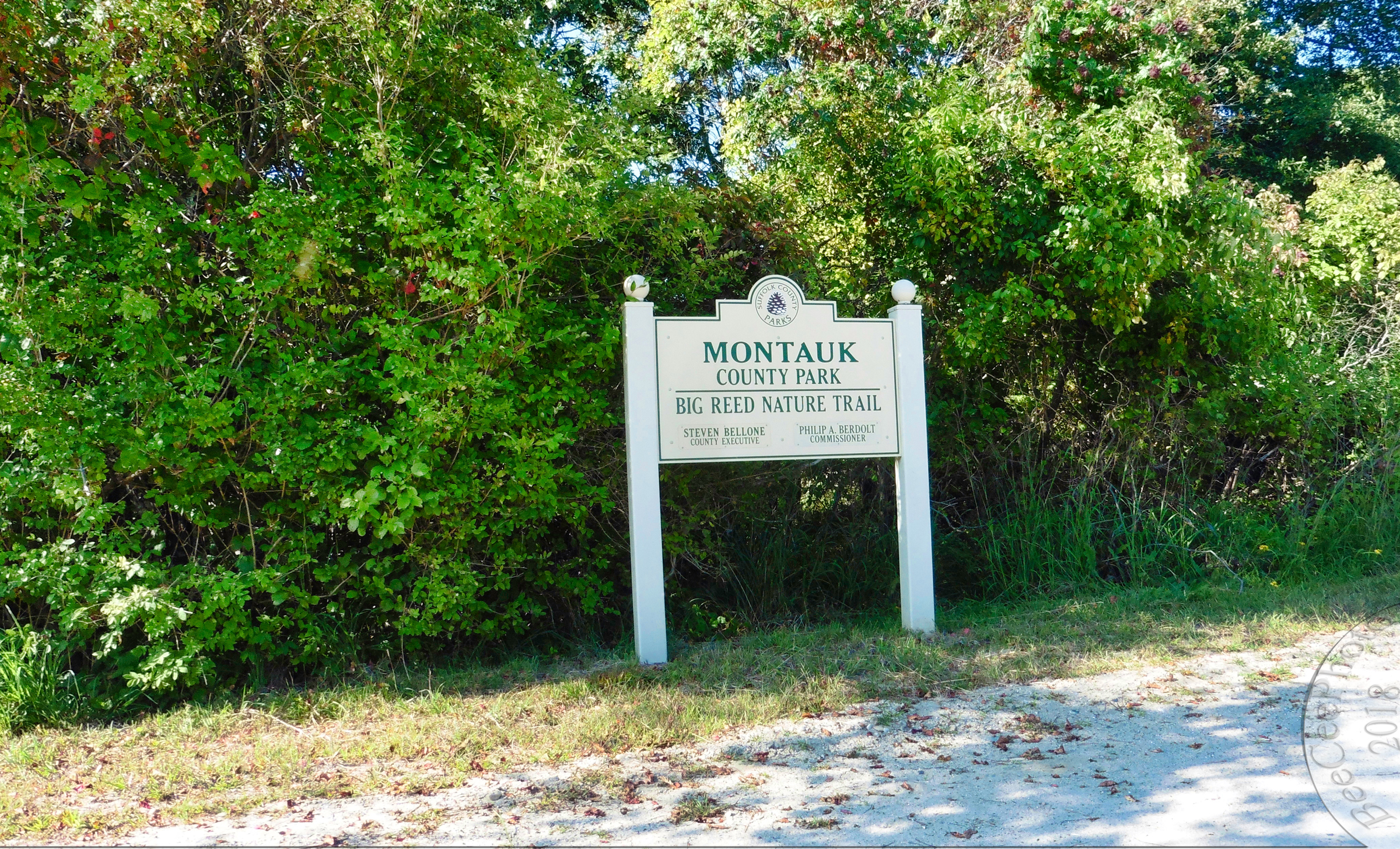
- Montauk County Park

- Location within New York
- Type: Regional park
- Location: Montauk, New York, U.S.
- Coordinates: 41°03′22″N 71°54′02″W
- Area: 4.68 square kilometres (1.81 sq mi)
- Operator: Suffolk County Department of Parks, Recreation & Conservation

Montauk County Park, formerly known as Theodore Roosevelt County Park, is located approximately three miles (4.8 km) east of Montauk, New York. The park measures 4.68 square kilometres (1.81 sq mi) in size, running from Montauk Highway north to Block Island Sound and is bordered on the east by Montauk Point State Park.

Montauk County Park was created from 1971 to 1986 through a series of land acquisitions by Suffolk County with the help of Hilda Lindley and the Concerned Citizens of Montauk. It was named for Theodore Roosevelt in 1998 to commemorate the centennial anniversary of his return to Long Island following the Spanish–American War, however it was renamed "Montauk County Park" in 2014 after concerns were raised about the insignificance of Roosevelt's actual involvement with the area.

The park includes:

- Big Reed Pond – a National Natural Landmark.
- Montaukett Village – a home and burial ground of the Montaukett tribe of Native Americans, which includes the grave of member Stephen Talkhouse
- Deep Hollow Ranch – the first cattle ranch in the United States, established in 1658
- Third House – the third residence constructed in the 18th century for cattle keepers, who brought cattle to graze in Montauk each summer. The house is open seasonally.
- Camp Wikoff – where Theodore Roosevelt and his Rough Riders were temporarily quarantined after returning from the Spanish–American War in 1898

== Big Reed Pond ==
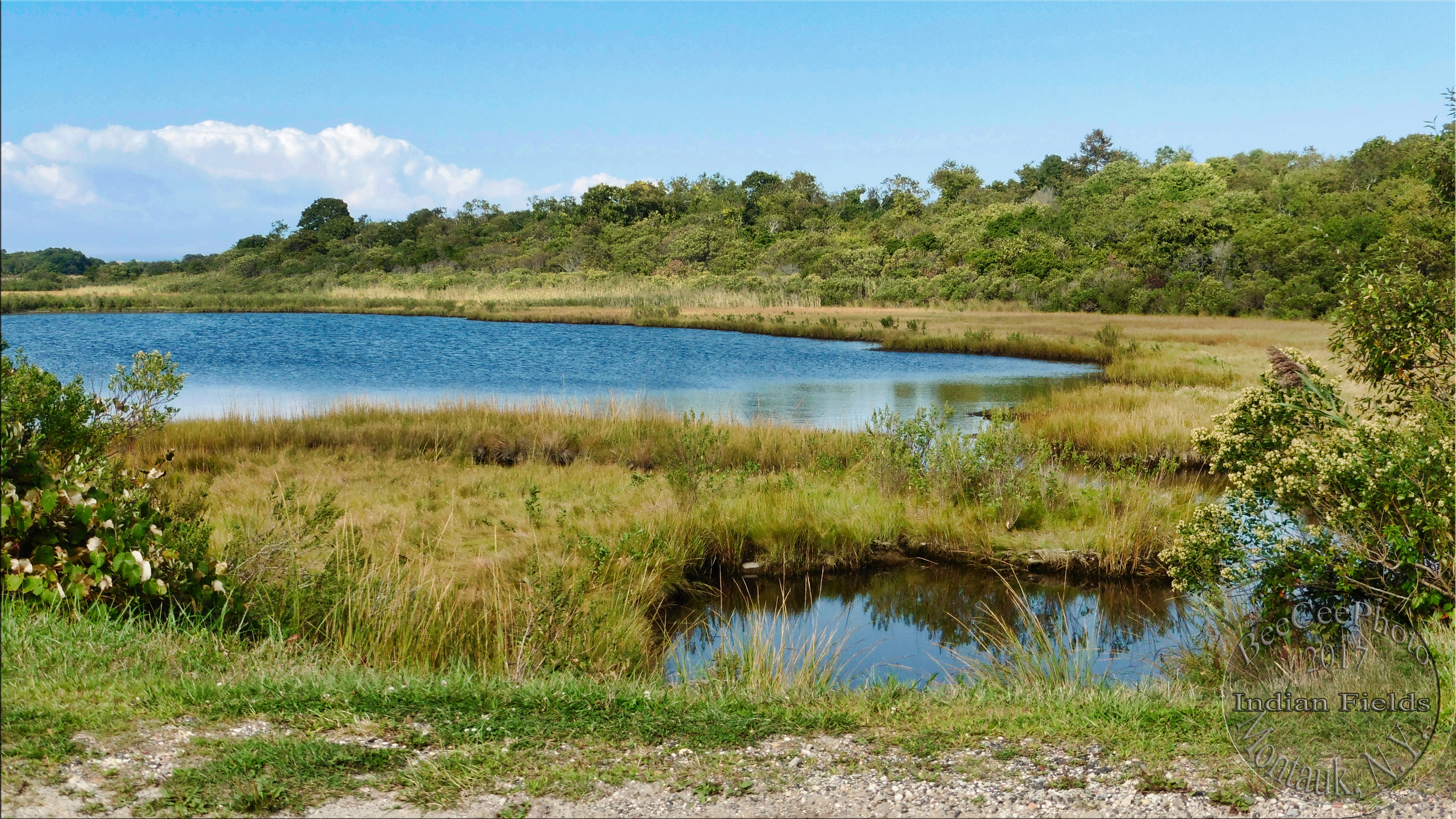
Indian Fields Montauk Big Reed Nature Trail

Big Reed Pond was designated as a registered National Natural Landmark in 1973. Its ecosystem is at the confluence between fresh water and brackish water, as the pond is fresh water but some of the wetlands that border it are brackish. The local sandy soil and high rates of precipitation create a fragile homeostatic balance between fresh water and saltwater. The maintenance of the County Park as open space helps to maintain this balance.

== Montaukett Village ==
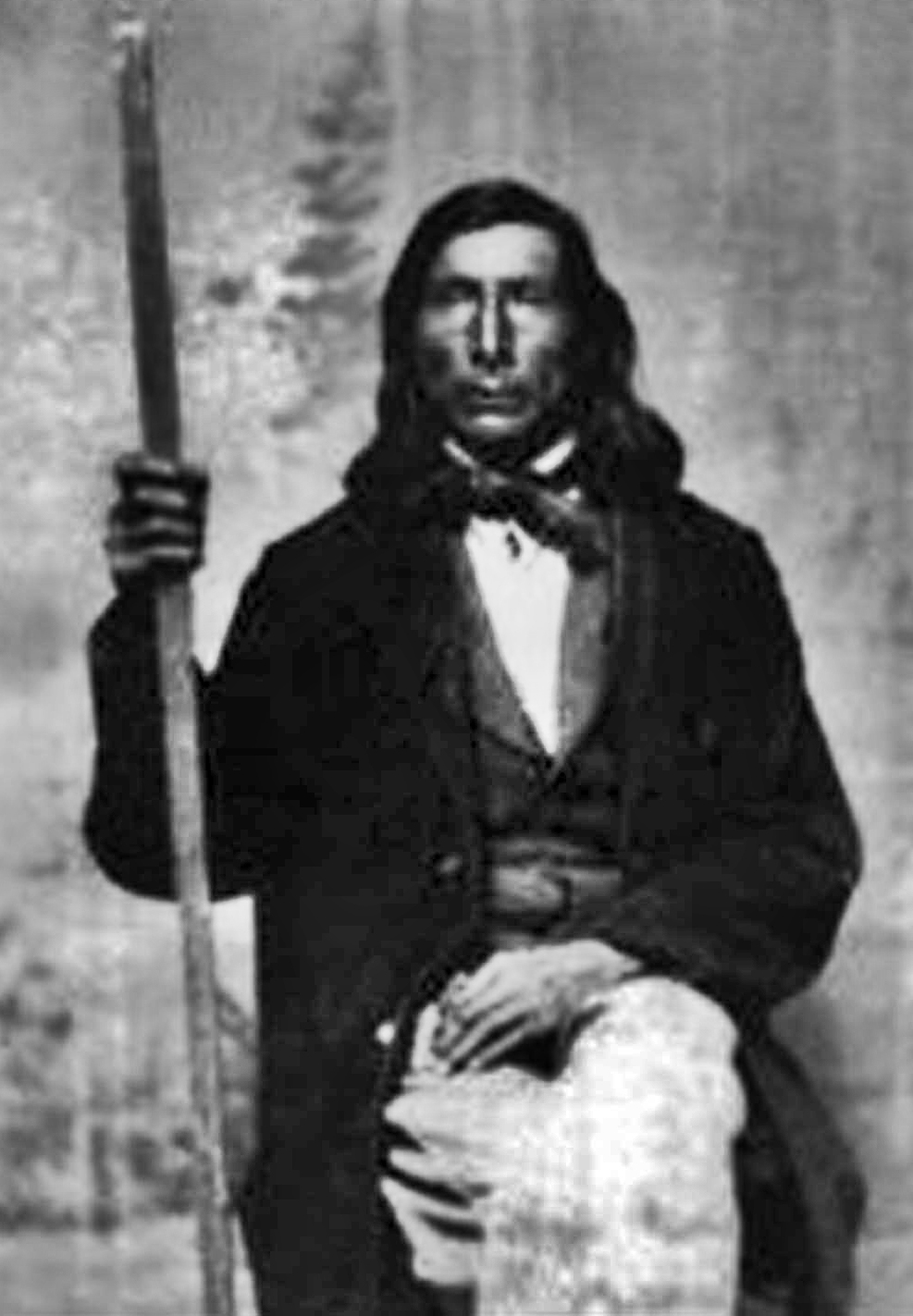
Stephen Talkhouse

The Montaukett tribe originally occupied this area of Long Island. In the late 17th century Chief Wyandanch gave much of the South Fork of Long Island to Lion Gardiner. The remaining Montauk were still living in the area until the Montauk peninsula was purchased by Arthur Bensen in 1879. The ruins of a sweat lodge and part of the village are still visible. The Pharaoh Museum is located in a small cabin near Third House and contains displays of the tools and pottery used by the Montaukett. Stephen Talkhouse, whose round trip walks of 30–50 miles (48–80 km) inspired the Paumanok Path, is buried in the cemetery.

== Deep Hollow Ranch ==
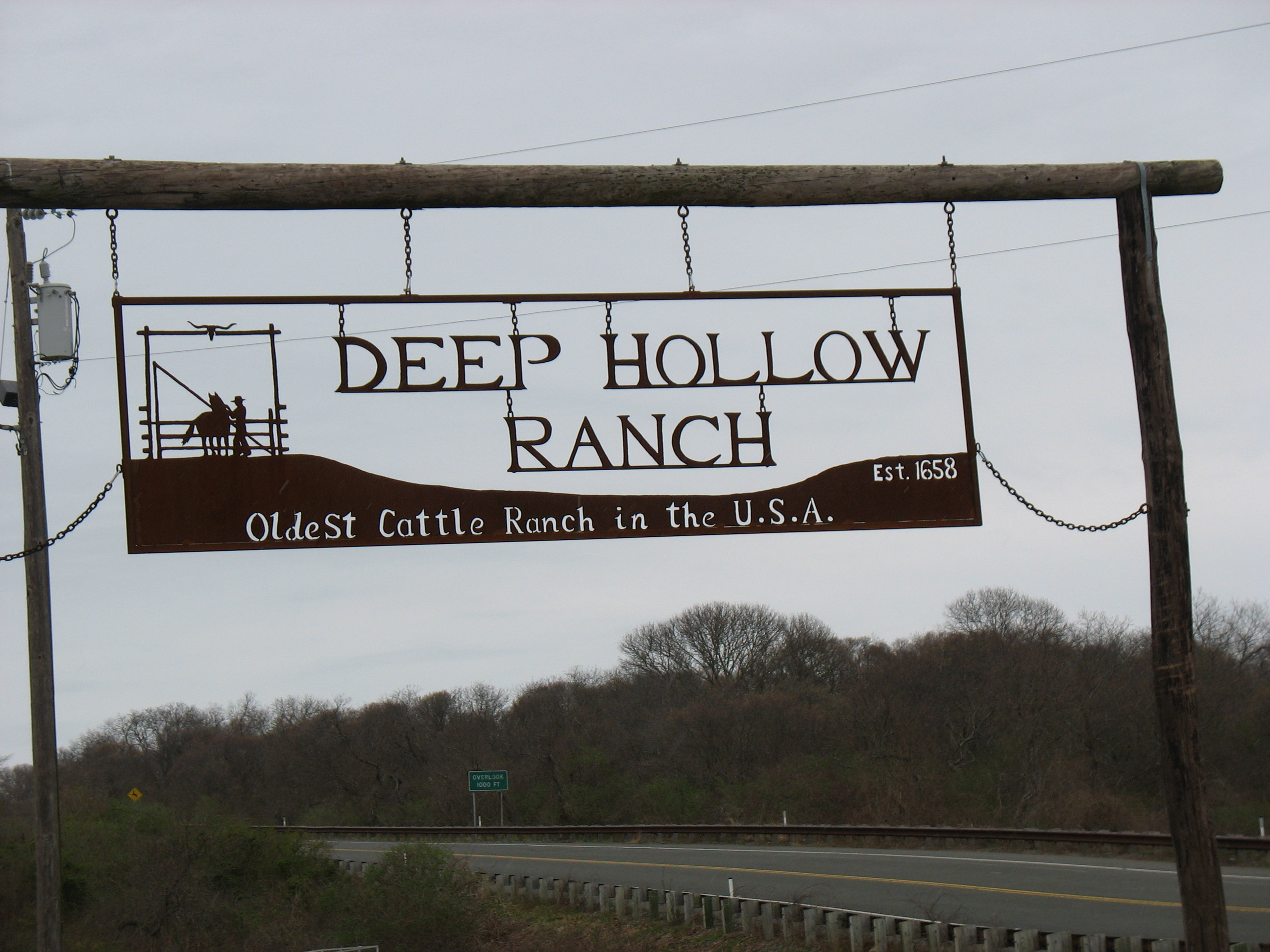
Deep Hollow Ranch sign

Deep Hollow Ranch claims to be the birthplace of the American cowboy, as it was founded as a cattle ranch in 1658. It has been operating continuously ever since; in the 21st century it offers horseback riding and hay rides.

From 1990 through 1999, Deep Hollow Ranch was the site of several "Back at the Ranch" concerts to raise funds for local charities. Most of the events were produced with the help of singer–songwriter Paul Simon, who owns a home near the ranch. The summer concerts had performers including The Allman Brothers Band, Edie Brickell, James Brown, Jimmy Buffett, The Cars, Ray Charles, Foreigner, Don Henley, The Highwaymen, Billy Joel, Lyle Lovett, Paul Simon and James Taylor, drawing as many as 10,000 attendees to each event.

== Third House ==
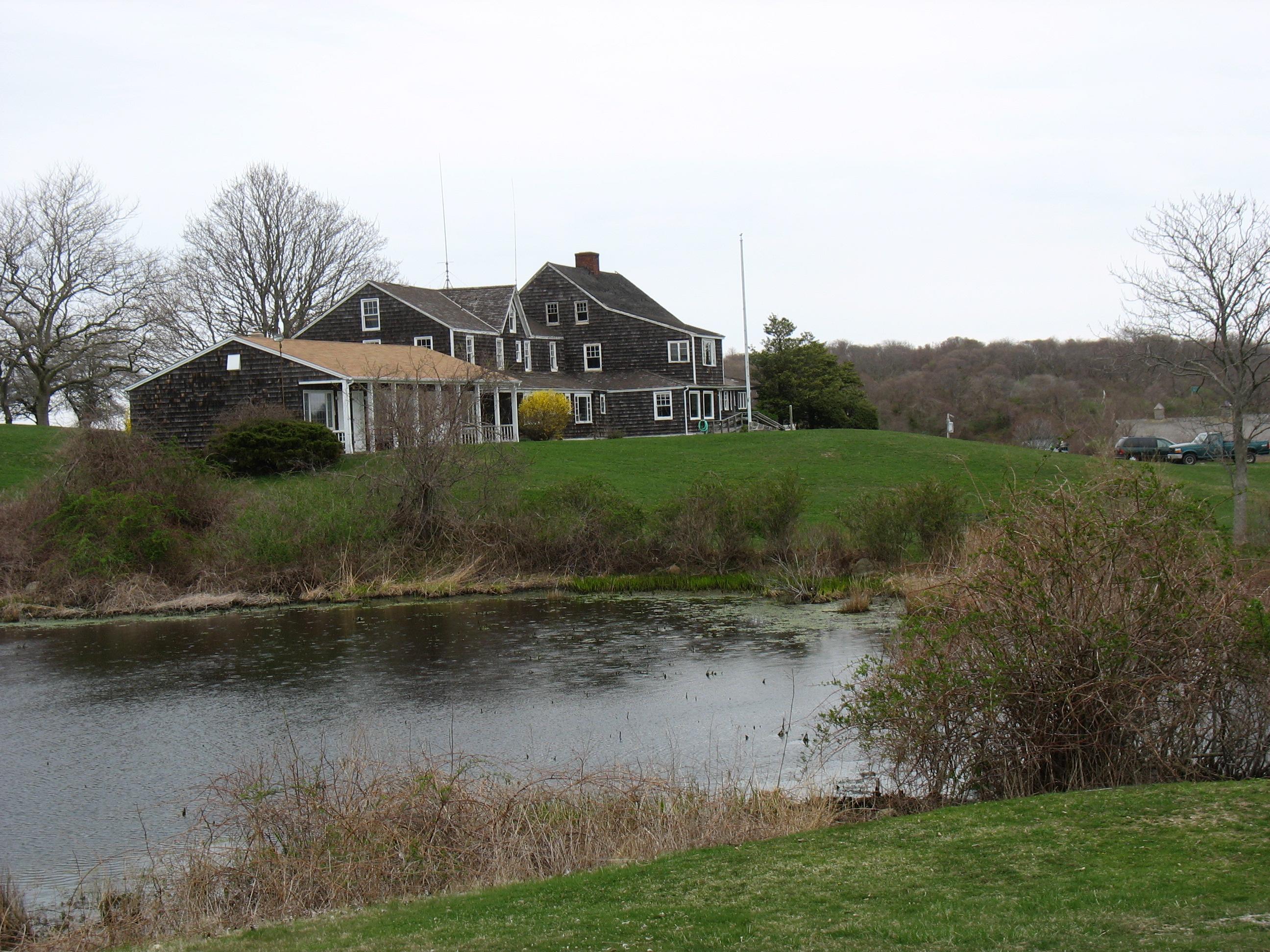
Montauk Third House

Running from west to east, First House, Second House and Third House were the first residences constructed on the eastern tip of Long Island after the keeper's quarters at Montauk Point Lighthouse. They were built in the 18th century for the cattle keepers who drove horses, sheep, and cattle to graze in Montauk each year from May through November. During summers, as many as 6,000 cattle, horses and sheep roamed pastures in Montauk, having been brought from as far west as Patchogue, a distance of approximately 70 miles (110 km).

First House was located near what is now Hither Hills State Park in Napeague and no longer exists. Second House is located at the west end of Montauk village and is now operated as a museum. Third House is used as the headquarters of Deep Hollow Ranch. In 1879 Arthur Bensen bought virtually all of the land on the eastern end from Napeague to Montauk Point. The purchase was intended to force the Montaukett off the land. Benson made Third House his residence, hoping to develop the area as a summer resort following Austin Corbin's extension of the Long Island Rail Road to Montauk.

== Camp Wikoff ==
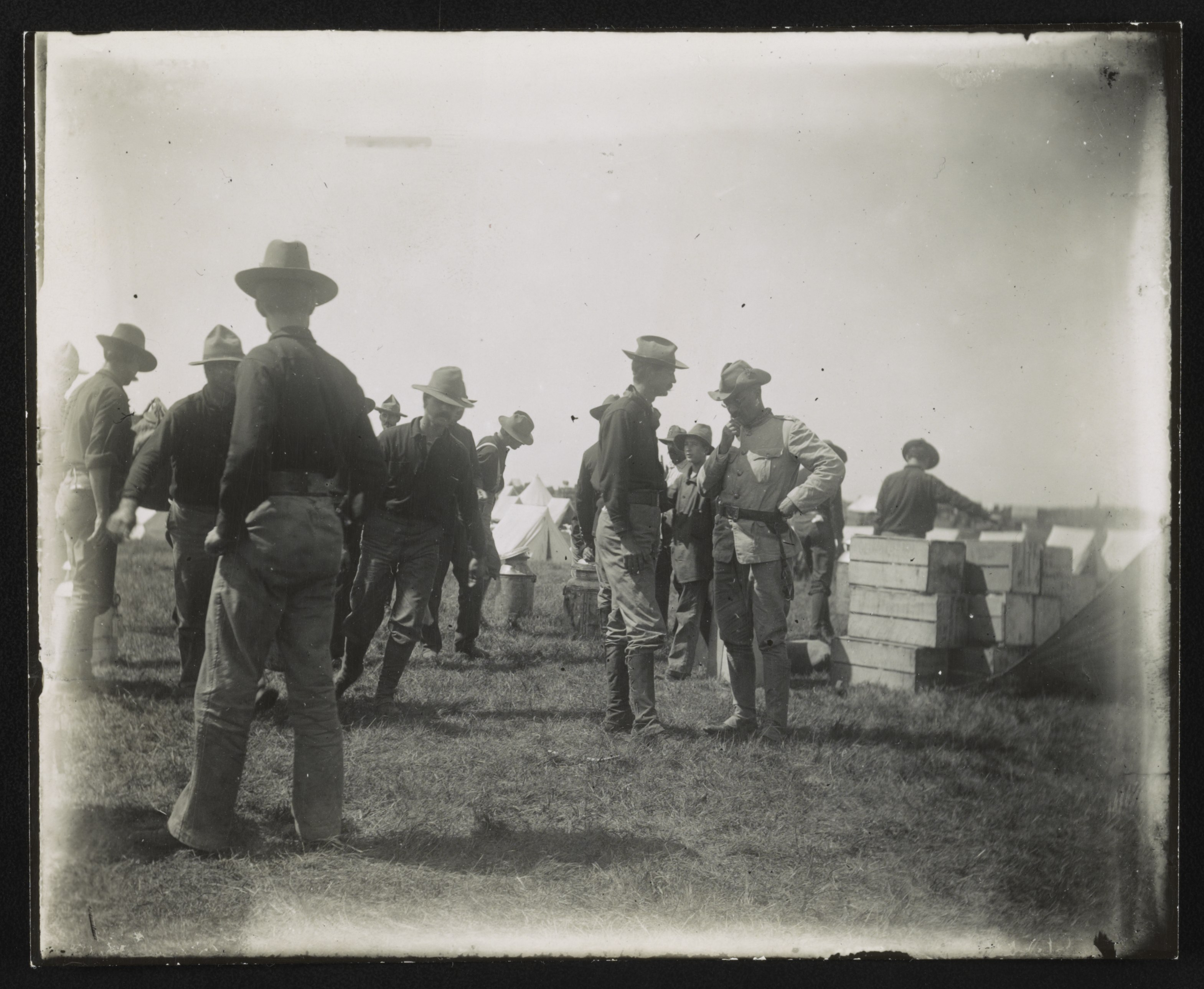
Theodore Roosevelt and Rough Riders quarantined at Camp Wikoff in 1898

Benson failed to realize his plans, and sold much of the land to the federal government, which used it for Army, Navy, and eventually Air Force bases.

Camp Wikoff, constructed on 5,000 acres (20 km^{2}) of land, was used to quarantine 29,000 soldiers, including Theodore Roosevelt and the Rough Riders, at the conclusion of the Spanish–American War to prevent the spread of yellow fever and other tropical diseases. It was named for Col. Charles A. Wikoff of the 22nd U.S. Infantry, who was killed in the San Juan Heights assaults of the Spanish–American War.

During World War II, sections of Camp Wikoff were developed for massive gun emplacements and concrete observation bunkers as part of the New York coastal defense. During the Cold War, a large radar tower was built at the Camp Hero section. Later the camp was abandoned by the military and sectioned off in three state parks.

Three state parks that include portions of the federal military complex and its infrastructure have been established:

- Camp Hero State Park
- Montauk Point State Park
- Shadmoor State Park

Other portions of the camp were sold to private developers.

Third House, formerly Camp Wikoff headquarters, now serves as the park headquarters. It contains a Spanish–American War exhibit with photo and memorabilia from the war and Roosevelt's disbanding of the Rough Riders. Camp Wikoff is open to the public May through October.

== See also ==
- Hendrick van der Heul
- Hilda Lindley House
