= Montauk Point land claim =

Three 1879 lawsuits in New York, US

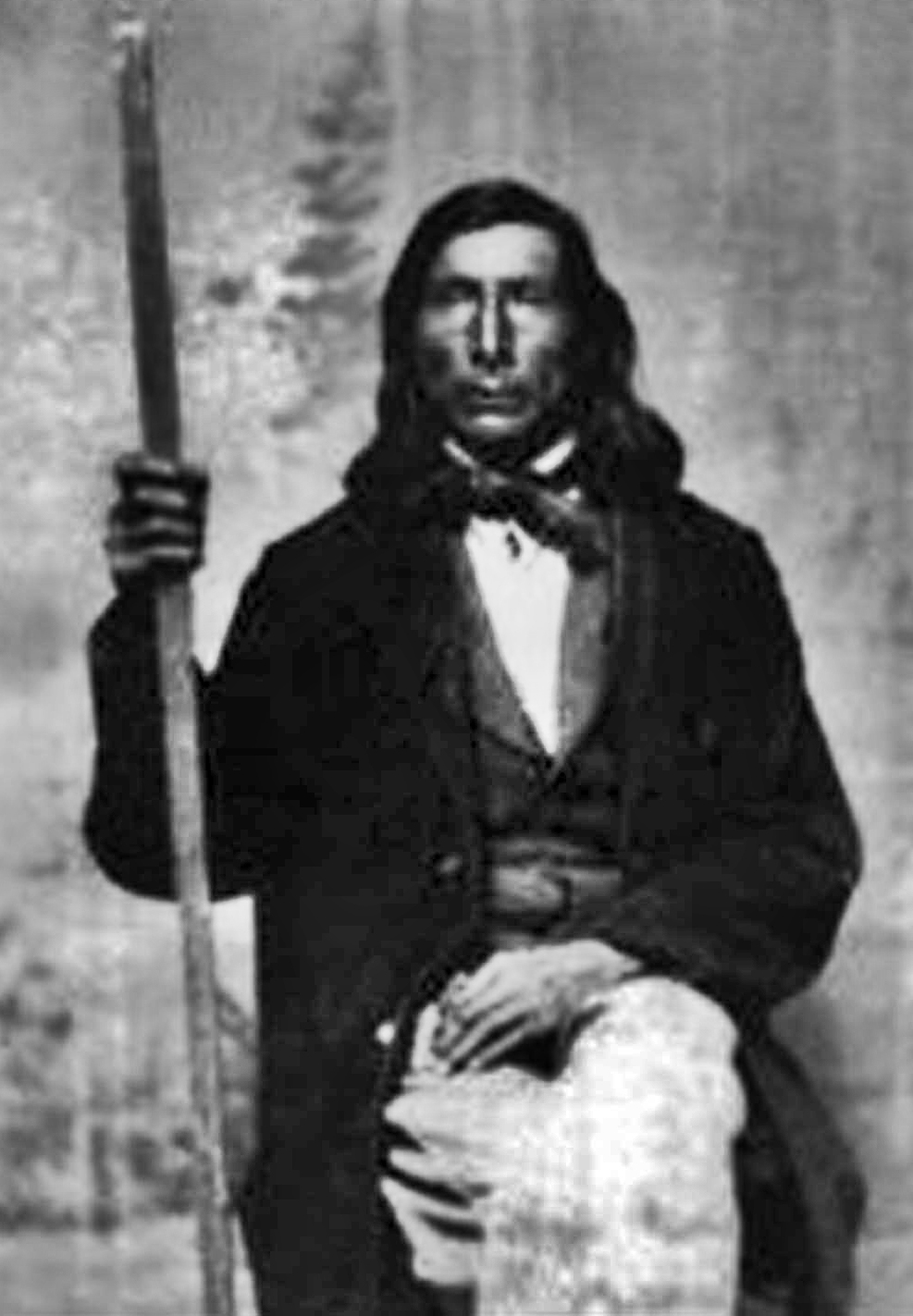
Stephen Talkhouse

The Montauk Point land claim was a series of three lawsuits brought by Chief Wyandank Pharaoh, nephew of the Stephen Talkhouse who died in the same year (1879) that the tribe lost the last remaining vestige of their territory in the New York state courts, claiming Montauk Point on behalf of the Montaukett Indians, against the Long Island Rail Road (LIRR) and its predecessors in title.

The first suit, Montauk Tribe of Indians v. Long Island R.R. Co., brought by Wyandank Pharaoh in the name of the tribe, was dismissed because the tribe had not been explicitly authorized by the state to sue in its own name.

As recommended by the Appellate Division's opinion, the second suit, Johnson v. Long Island R.R. Co., was brought in the name of Eugene A. Johnson, a citizen and tribal member. The New York Court of Appeals disavowed the previous dicta of the Appellate Division, and held that neither an individual Indian nor a tribe could sue in court without enabling legislation.

The tribe failed in its efforts to convince the federal government to pass legislation enabling the tribe to bring the claim in federal court. In 1906, the state passed a statute enabling the tribe to sue, and Wyandank Pharaoh brought a third suit, Pharaoh v. Benson, in the name of the tribe. Reaching the merits, the New York courts held that the tribe no longer existed and that the transactions were valid. Since the litigation, the Montauks have failed in their efforts to obtain compensation from the federal and state government, and much of the land in question has come to be held by public parks.

== Background ==
Map of the Long Island Rail Road, circa 1876

Circa 1875, the Montauk tribe began renting out Montauk Point for pasturage through the Proprietors' Company; the company took possession of the grazing allotments, and paid the tribe an annuity. Circa 1880, the shareholders of the company disagreed over whether the lands should continue to be leased, or whether they should be re-apportioned. In 1878, Robert M. Grinnell sued Edward M. Baker et al. for partition and division of the allotments. In Grinnell v. Baker (unreported), the court ordered the lands sold at public auction (subject to the Montauk claim), with the proceeds distributed equally among the non-Indian lessees, rather than the Montauk tribe.

The auction took place at the home of Jehial Parsons. Arthur W. Benson bought the 11,000 acres (45 km^{2}) at auction for $151,000 in 1879. In turn, Benson sold 5,000 acres (20 km^{2}) of the land to the Long Island Rail Road for $600,000.

Benson hired Nathaniel Dominey to negotiate the removal of the Montauks still living on the reservation. At a later, Senate Sub-Committee hearing, Dominey testified that eight Indians remained on the reservation at the time, including: future Chief Wyandank Pharaoh (10 years old at the time), his mother, and two of her brothers. Later, Dominey experienced a change of heart and cooperated with the Montauks in their claim, and turning over his letters from Benson. Dominey testified that he compensated Wyandank Pharaoh's mother with a $100 semi-annual annuity and two houses, to be inherited by Pharaoh, $80 each to her two brothers, and $10 to Wyandank.

Arthur Benson had viewed Montauk as "his private playground"; after his death, his son approached Austin Corbin, President and controlling shareholder of the Long Island Rail Road, and Charles Pratt, of Standard Oil, about the possibility of voiding his fathers will and opening Montauk to development. Montauk Point was purchased by Corbin and Pratt in 1895.

On October 30, 1895, Chief Wyandank Pharaoh returned from a research trip to Brooklyn and Washington, D.C. to gather evidence to pursue a claim. Pharaoh declared his intentions to undertake a hunting trip on the disputed land and initiate a lawsuit if he was interfered with.

The New York Times blamed Chief Pharaoh for the dispute:

If King Wyandank Pharaoh of the Montauk Tribe of Indians had not given for $10 the living members of the Montauk tribe might now be wealthy, instead of being poor and fighting for their rights with a desperate hope of regaining at least part of what they claim to be their lawful heritage.

== Montauk Tribe of Indians v. Long Island R.R. Co. (App. Div. 1898) ==
=== Supreme Court ===
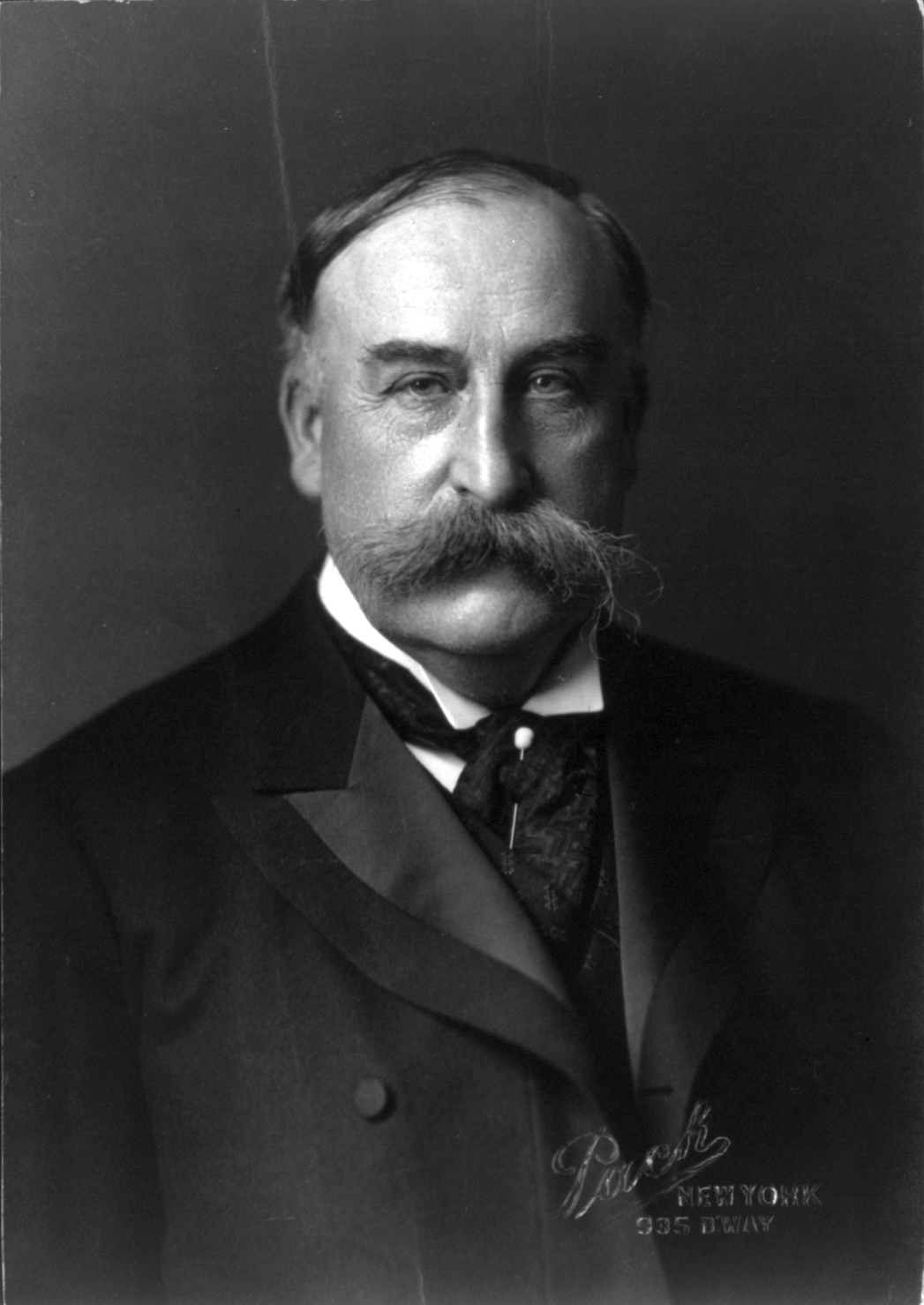
Judge Edgar M. Cullen delivered the opinion of the Appellate Division.

Chief Wyandank Pharaoh, on behalf of the tribe, filed suit, stating a cause of action for ejectment on February 5, 1897. For proof of tribal status, the tribe cited a partition action decided by Judge Dykman and the 1890 United States census. The complaint valued the land at approximately $300,000.

On June 5, 1897, Judge Wilmot Moses Smith of the New York Supreme Court set a hearing date for June 19 in Patchogue to hear the oral arguments for the defendants' demurrer. The matter was transferred to Judge Samuel T. Maddox in Brooklyn. Judge Maddox granted the demurrer, dismissing the action but allowing the tribe to re-plead if they paid costs.

=== Appellate Division ===
The Montauk's, represented by ex-judge George M. Curtis, filed a notice of appeal on December 22, 1897. Before the Appellate Division, the Montauk's case was argued by Leman B. Treadwell, with Francis M. Morrison (both Boston lawyers) also on the brief. Alfred A. Gardner argued on behalf of the LIRR, with William J. Kelly on the brief. The Appellate Division panel consisted of Judges Goodrich, Edgar M. Cullen, Willard Bartlett, Hatch, and Woodward.

The Appellate Division of the Second Department unanimously affirmed the judgment of the Suffolk Special Term on April 19, 1898. Citing Strong v. Waterman and Seneca Nation of Indians v. Christy, Judge Cullen noted that "no provision had been made by law for bringing ejectment to recover possession of [Indians]" and "as a body or tribe, the Indians have no corporate name by which they can institute such a suit." Judge Cullen suggested that the tribe either petition the legislature for enabling legislation to allow them to sue as a tribe, or have individual members bring the suit.

== Johnson v. Long Island R.R. Co. (N.Y. 1900) ==
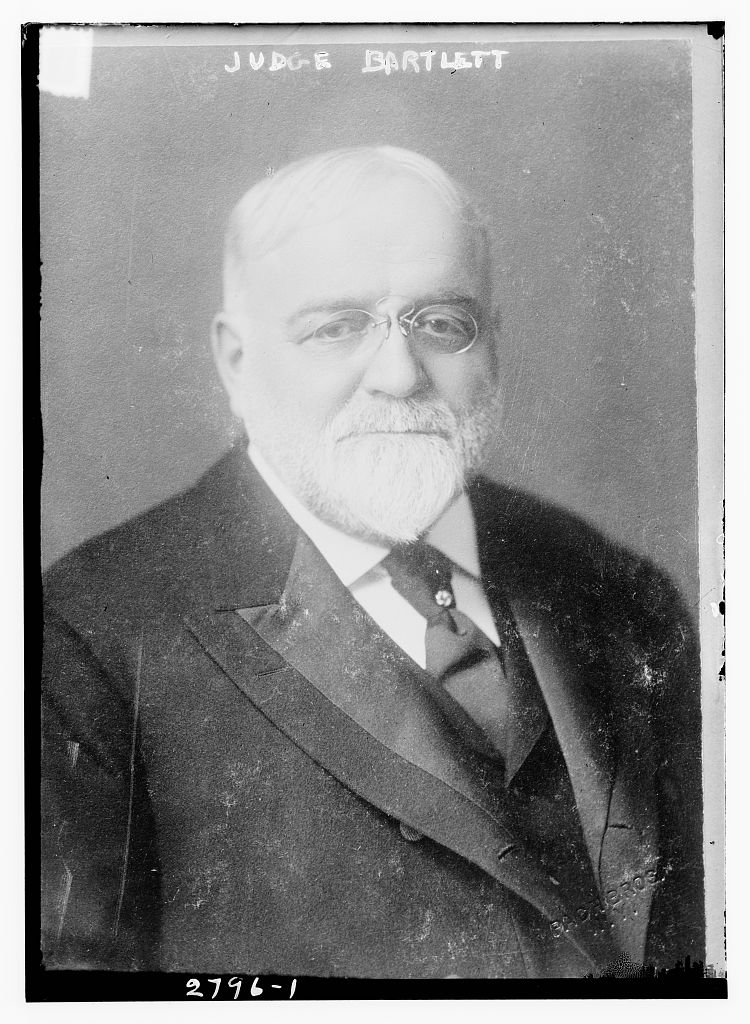
Judge Edward T. Bartlett held that neither an individual Indian nor a tribe could sue, unless authorized by state statute.

=== Supreme Court ===
Eugene A. Johnson, a U.S. citizen of Montauk descent, and a member of the tribe since birth, brought a similar suit in his own name, on behalf of himself and other similarly interested. The Special Term sustained a demurrer.

=== Appellate Division ===
The divided panel of the Appellate Division of the Second Department reversed on July 1, 1899. In a per curiam opinion, joined by all but Judge Willard Bartlett, the Appellate Division held:

While the right to maintain this action in its present form is not free from doubt, still, as it is brought in accordance with the view expressed by us on the prior appeal, we think we should adhere to our former decision, and allow the question to be finally determined by the court of appeals.

=== Court of Appeals ===
The Appellate Division certified three questions to the Court of Appeals:

1. Has the plaintiff in this action legal capacity to sue?
2. Is there a defect of the parties plaintiff in this action, in that the members of the alleged Montauk Tribe of Indians are not made parties plaintiff?
3. Does the complaint herein state facts sufficient to constitute a cause of action?

Before the Court of Appeals, Treadwell and Morrison again argued for the Montauks, while Gardner and Kelly again argued for the LIRR.

The New York Court of Appeals reversed the Appellate Division, and affirmed the Special Term, on April 17, 1900. The court answered all three certified questions in the negative, without costs to either party. Judge Edward T. Bartlett, joined by Judges Denis O'Brien, Albert Haight, and Celora E. Martin, held that Johnson had no capacity to bring a suit on the tribe's behalf. The Court held that Indians, as wards of the state, had no right to sue unless conferred by statute:

A decision holding that this action could be maintained either by the tribe, or an individual member thereof on behalf of himself and all others who should come in and contribute, would be contrary to the policy and practice which have been long established in our treatment of the Indian tribes. They are regarded as the wards of the state, and, generally speaking, possessed of only such rights to appear and litigate in courts of justice as are conferred upon them by statute.

Chief Judge Alton B. Parker concurred in the result, without separate opinion; Judges Irving G. Vann and Landon dissented, without opinion.

== Senate Indian Affairs Sub-Committee hearing (1900) ==
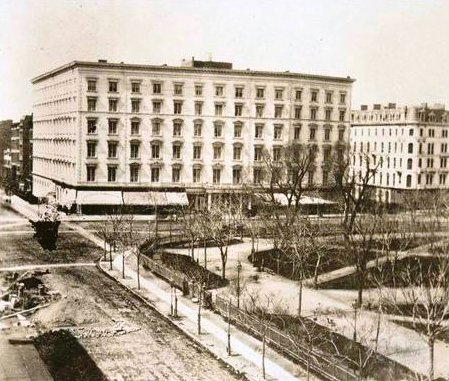
The Fifth Avenue Hotel, the site of the Sub-Committee hearing

Chief Pharaoh, along with representatives of the Shinnecock Tribe, Narragansett Tribe, and Mohegan Tribe, testified before a Sub-Committee of the Senate Indian Affairs Committee on September 22, 1900, at the Fifth Avenue Hotel. The Sub-Committee consisted of Senators John M. Thurston (R-NE) and Orville H. Platt (R-CT). In addition to Pharaoh, the testifying Indians were: Rev. Eugene A. Johnson, Nathan J. Cuffee, and James Cuffee (of the Montauk Council), John Noka, Joshua Noka, and Donald Seeter (of the Narragansett Council), David Kellis (of the Shinnecock Council). Maria Crippen and Dr. William H. Johnson of the Montauk tribe were among the spectators.

Rev. Johnson testified that there were 300 living members of the Montauk tribe. Johnson also testified that the New York state legislature had denied the Montauks a hearing because they were not "persons." Johnson argued that the Montauks could not alienate property without the consent of both New York and the federal government. He valued the disputed property at $3,000,000.

The tribes requested special legislation to allow them to bring their land claims, for fraud, in the United States circuit court. The Montauks and Shinnecocks claimed 11,000 acres (45 km^{2}) of Montauk Point; the Narragansetts an eight-square-mile tract near Narragansett Bay; the Mohegans a reservation in and near Norwich, Connecticut. Tredwell and Morrison continued to represent the tribes before the hearing.

== State enabling legislation (1906) ==
A bill granting the Montauks permission to sue was introduced in February 1903. The Montauk's lawyer, Charles O. Maas, was the key lobbyist for the bill.

On April 10, 1906, the New York legislature passed a statute enabling the Montauk tribe to bring suit, The act contained the following proviso: "the question as to the existence of the Montauk Tribe of Indians shall be a question of law and fact to be determined by the court." Judge Blackmar interpreted the act as "providing that the act should not be construed as conferring tribal rights on any individuals, but that the question of the existence of the Montauk Tribe should be determined by the court."

== Pharaoh v. Benson (N.Y. 1918) ==
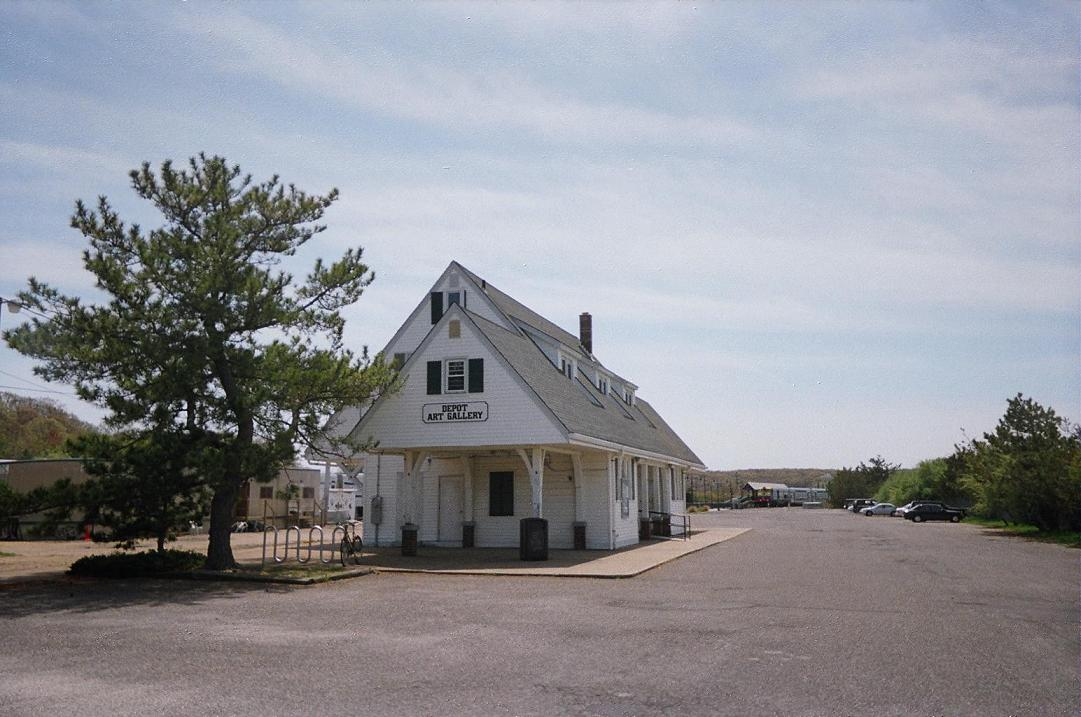
The former Montauk LIRR station house

=== Supreme Court ===
Pursuant to the enabling act, Chief Wyandank Pharaoh brought a third suit on behalf of the tribe in 1906. The named defendants were: Jane Ann Benson and Mary Benson, the executrices of Arthur Benson's will, John J. Pierrepoint and Henry R. Hoyt, the executors and trustees of Frank Sherman Benson's will, Mary Benson, the Montauk Company, the Montauk Dock and Improvement Company, Alfred W. Hoyt, the Montauk Extension Railroad Company, and the Long Island Rail Road. An area of 4,200 acres (17 km^{2}) was named in the third complaint (1,200 acres (4.9 km^{2}) of it adjacent to the LIRR).

Chief Pharaoh was represented by Maas and Lawrence W. Trowbridge (of counsel). The defendants were represented by Daly, Hoyt & Mason (for the Bensons), Austin & McLanahan (for the Dock and Improvement Co.), A. T. Mason (for Pierrepoint and Henry Hoyt), P. Tecumseh Sherman (for Alfred Hoyt), and Joseph Keany (for the LIRR). According to a 1910 Q&A in the New York Times, the lawyers fees were "long since supposed to have eclipsed the value of the land in litigation."

The trial took place, without a jury, before Judge Abel Blackmar of the Supreme Court of Suffolk County, Special Term. Fourteen of the sixteen living Montauk men appeared as witnesses at trial.

Judge Blackmar, ruled against the Montauks on October 11, 1910. According to Blackmar, the Montauks individually conveyed all their lands and claims to Arthur Benson between 1885 and 1894, in exchange for $100 to $250 each, except for Wyandank Pharaoh who received only $10, plus between 5 and 45 acres (20,000 and 182,000 m^{2}) in Freetown and East Hampton, plus a $240 annuity to be divided per capita.

Judge Blackmar also relied upon a December 1686 patent granted by Governor Thomas Dongan to the freeholders of East Hampton, granting them the exclusive right to purchase Indian lands in the area. Benson had separately purchased the fee rights from the descendants of the patentees.

Judge Blackmar also held that the Montauks were no longer a tribe:

During this long period the number of the Indians was greatly reduced. Their blood became so mixed that in many of them Indian traits were obliterated. They had no internal government, and they lived a sort of shiftless life, hunting, fishing, cultivating the ground 'Indian fashion' as a witness called it, and often leaving for long periods and working in some menial capacity for the whites.

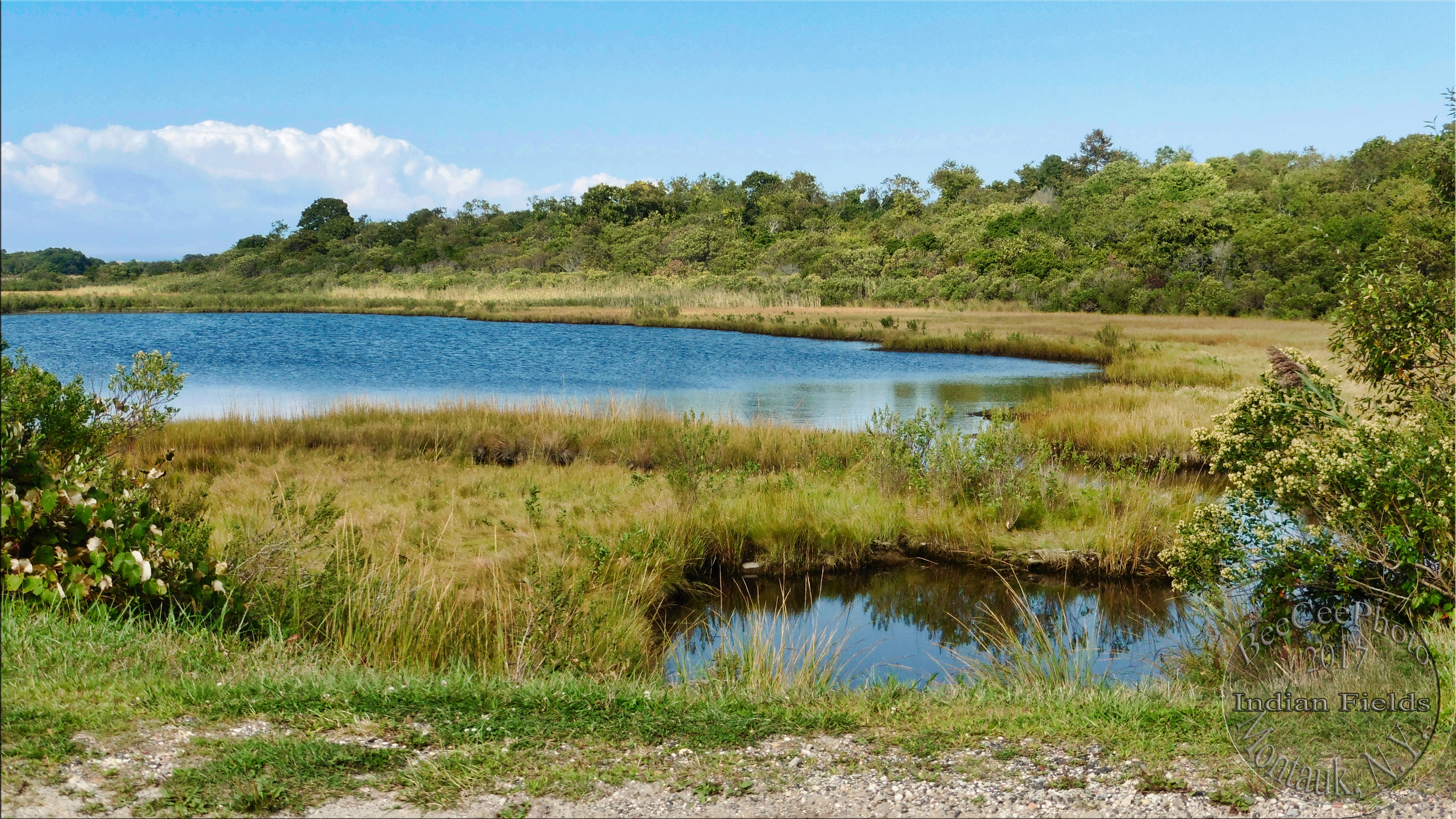
Indian Fields Montauk Big Reed Nature Trail

=== Appellate Division ===
On appeal, the Montauks found a new lawyer: Allen Caruthers.

The Appellate Division—composed of Judges Jenks, Burr, Rich, Stapleton, and Putnam—affirmed on October 16, 1914. On appeal, the Montauks were represented by Allen Caruthers, while the defendants were represented by Charles K. Carpenter, with Alexander T. Mason and George T. Austin on the brief. Judge Burr, for a unanimous court, wrote the opinion.

=== Court of Appeals ===
The Court of Appeals—composed of Chief Judge Frank Harris Hiscock and Judges Emory A. Chase, Frederick Collin, William Herman Cuddeback, John W. Hogan, McLaughlin, and Frederick E. Crane—affirmed (per curiam, without opinion) on January 29, 1918, without costs.

== Aftermath ==
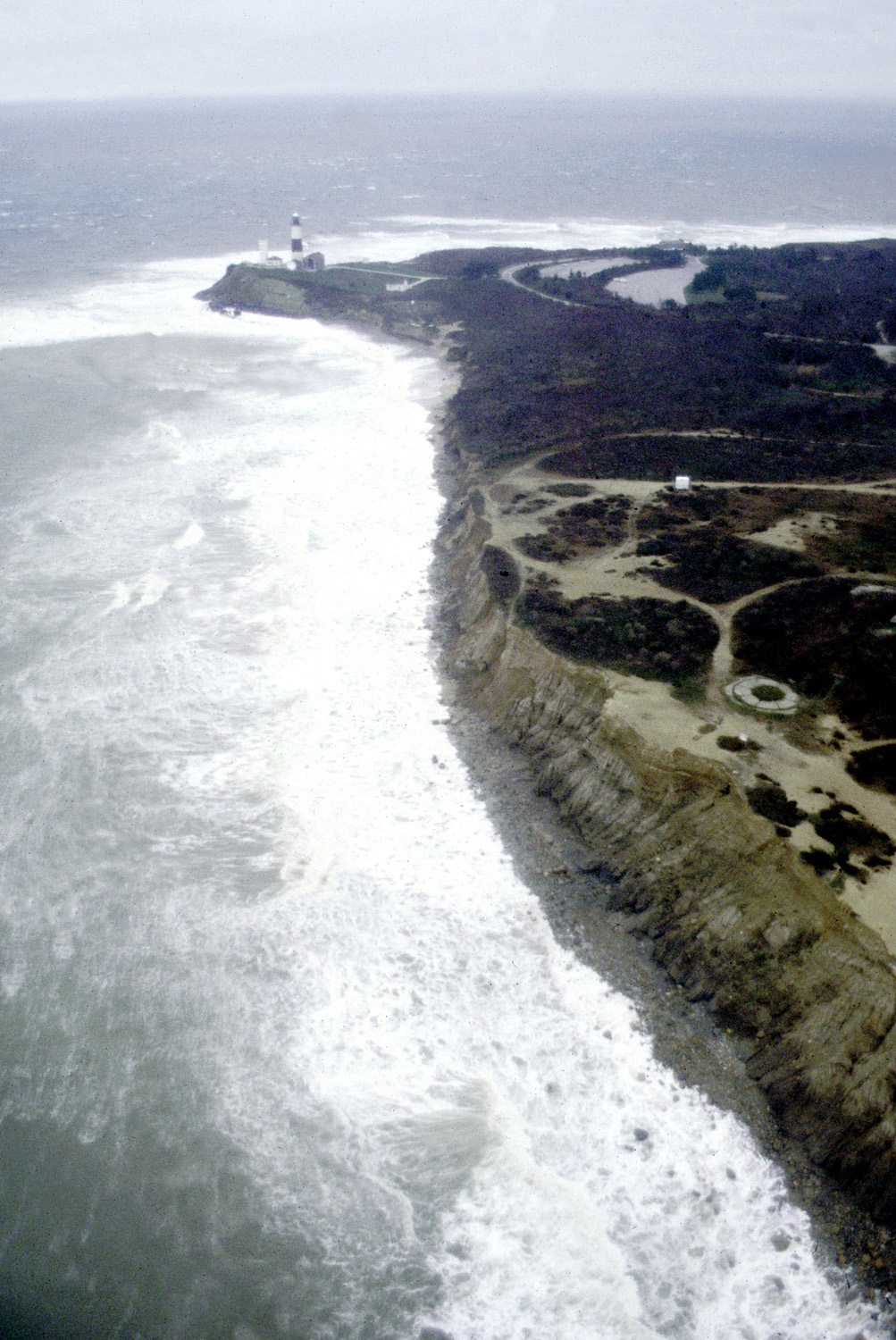
Montauk Point State Park

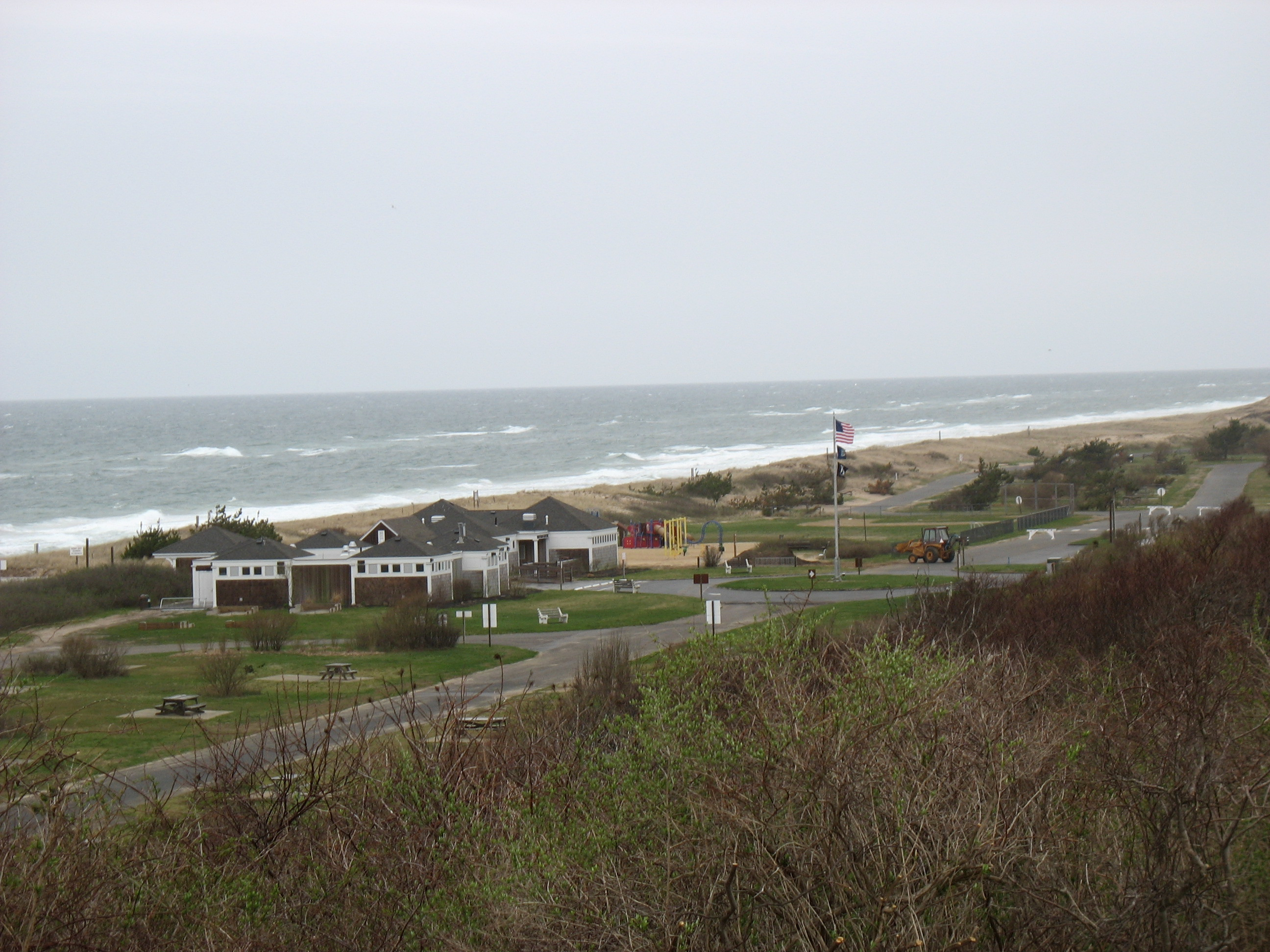
Hither Hills State Park

=== Federal lobbying ===
Maas departed for Washington, D.C., after the passage of the state enabling legislation. The Interior Department endorsed the idea on July 7, 1906.

In January 1921, Senator James Wolcott Wadsworth, Jr. (R-NY) and Representative Homer P. Snyder (R-NY) introduced legislation and asked the Interior Secretary to report to Congress on the Montauk's tribal status and the merits of their land claim. The Secretary prepared a report agreeing with the conclusions of Judge Blackmar and the New York appellate courts in Pharaoh v. Benson. The Senate Committee on Indian Affairs received the report on April 22, 1922, and introduced the Wadsworth bill that June; the bill did not make it out of committee.

In 1996, represented by Bell, Boyd & Lloyd, the Montauks filed a letter of intent with the Branch of Acknowledgement and Research of the Bureau of Indian Affairs, the first step towards federal recognition. The petition for recognition was submitted on June 23, 1998. The tribe received a request for documents from the BIA in January 1999.

=== State lobbying ===
On February 14, 1922, New York state assemblyman John J. O'Connor introduced legislation to compensate the Montauks. The bill excluded James Waters and the other members of the Montauk diaspora. The bill would have created a three-person committee—composed of two assembly members and one state senator—to determine whether the land claim had been meritorious. The bill never reached the floor.

=== Montaukett burial grounds ===
In 1983, Fort Hill Associates and Signal Hill Associates applied to the town of East Hampton for a permit to build homes on North Neck hill, above the Montauks’ ancestral burial ground. As quoted in the New York Times, the East Hampton town supervisor said, "Who cares about a bunch of dead Indians?" The Montauketts won a temporary injunction in court that July. That November, the town board voted to purchase the 30 acres (120,000 m^{2}) for $1.4 million and preserve the burial ground.

In 1989, developers announced plans touching on a different Montaukett burial ground in North Neck. After protests, the town government agreed to preserve the site in 1991.

=== State parks ===
In 1984, the federal government announced plans to sell Montauk Air Force Station, a 278 acres (1.1 km^{2}) air force installation southwest of Montauk Point, to real estate developers. New York State and the Town of East Hampton sued to block the sale. The land was eventually turned over to the New York State Park Service, becoming Camp Hero State Park. The state purchased 1,000 acres (4.0 km^{2}) of Hither Woods in 1986 and created Hither Hills State Park. In 1988, the state purchased 777 acres (3.1 km^{2}) more to augment the park.
