= Stephen Talkhouse =

Native American walker (c. 1819–1879)

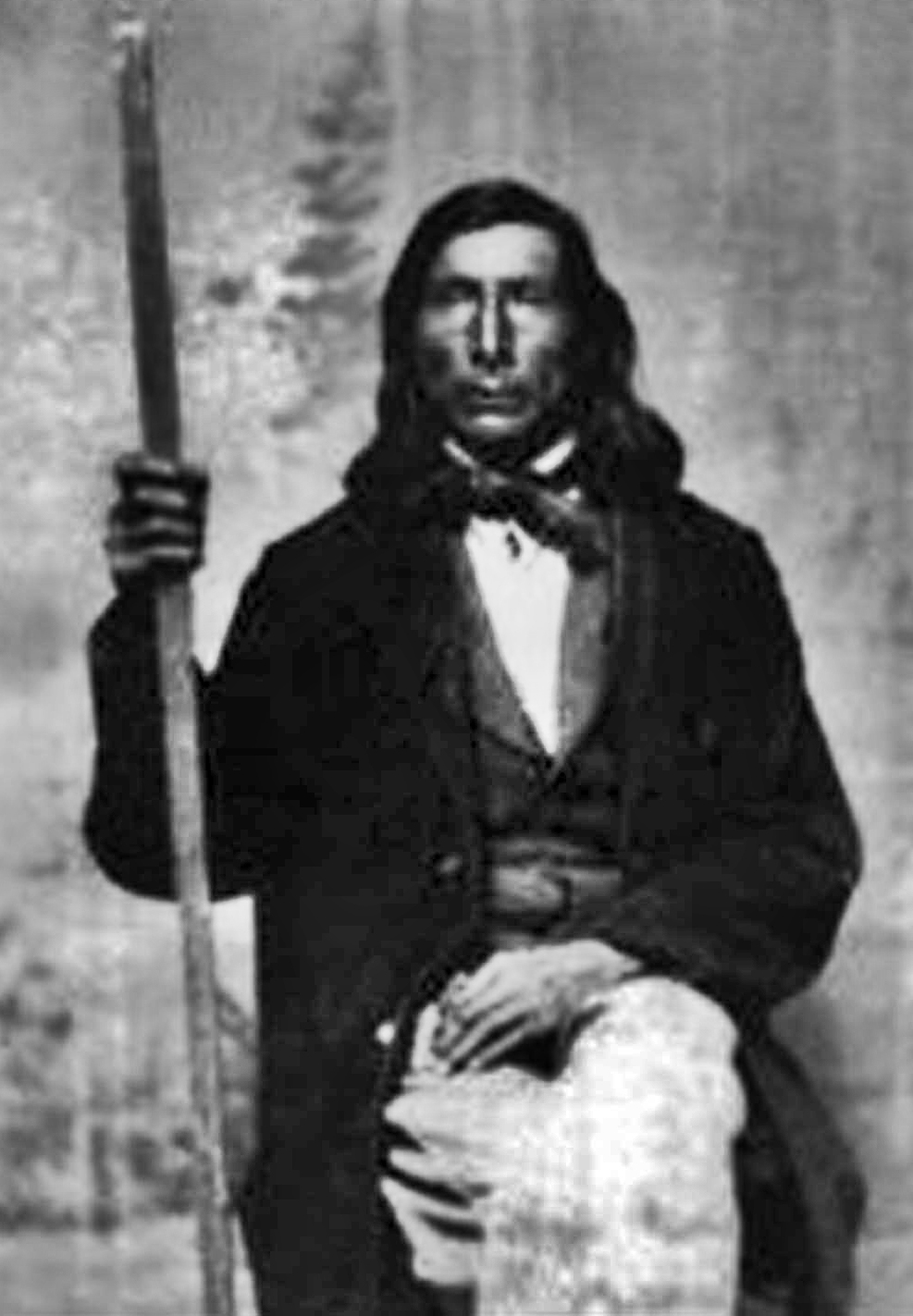
- Died: August 30, 1879

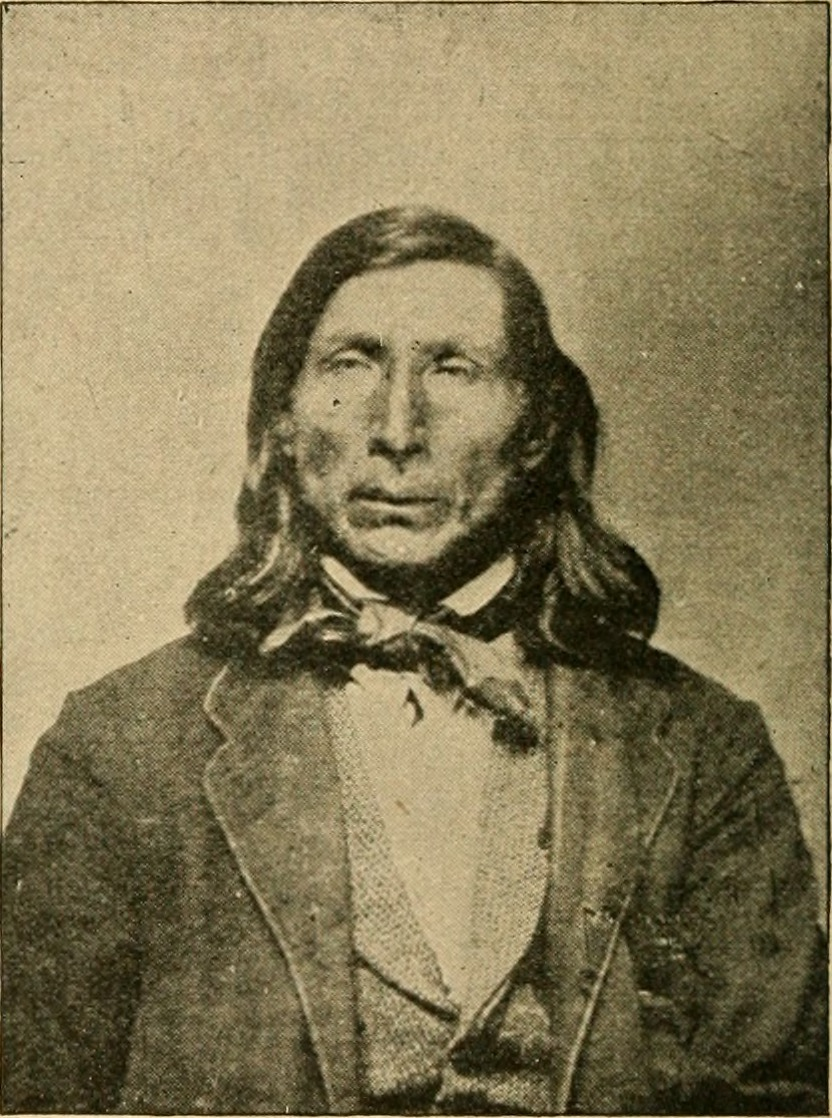
Close-up of Talkhouse, aka David Pharaoh, "Last King of the Montauk"

Stephen Talkhouse (Stephen Taukus "Talkhouse" Pharaoh, ca. 1819–1879) was a Montaukett Native American of the late 19th century who was famed for his 25–50 mile daily round trip walks from Montauk, New York to East Hampton and Sag Harbor. Landmarks along the route have been named for him.

He was said to be a descendant of Chief Wyandanch, who sold much of the eastern end of Long Island to Lion Gardiner.

P. T. Barnum featured Pharaoh as "The Last King of the Montauks", despite his being neither a king nor the last Montaukett.

Talkhouse died August 30, 1879, aged about 60. He was buried in a small Indian burial ground on Talkhouse Lane off East Lake Drive in Montauk, now located within Theodore Roosevelt County Park. The remains of his home are also located there.

Part of his route has been commemorated as part of the Paumanok Path.

== See also ==
- Montauk Point land claim
