= Big Reed Pond =

Lake in New York, United States

- Location within New York
- Location: Montauk, Long Island, New York
- Coordinates: 41°04′40″N 71°54′38″W
- Basin countries: United States

U.S. National Natural Landmark
- Designated: May 1973

Big Reed Pond is a freshwater pond located in Montauk, New York on Long Island. A 128-acre (0.52 km^{2}) site including the pond, brackish marshland and natural sand dunes was designated as a National Natural Landmark in 1973. The largely undeveloped pond is located within Theodore Roosevelt County Park.

The Montaukett tribe lived in the vicinity of the pond until the mid-19th century.

The pond and its associated wetlands are accessible via hiking trails that are open to the public.

== See also ==
- List of National Natural Landmarks in New York
