= Shadmoor State Park =

State park in Suffolk County, New York

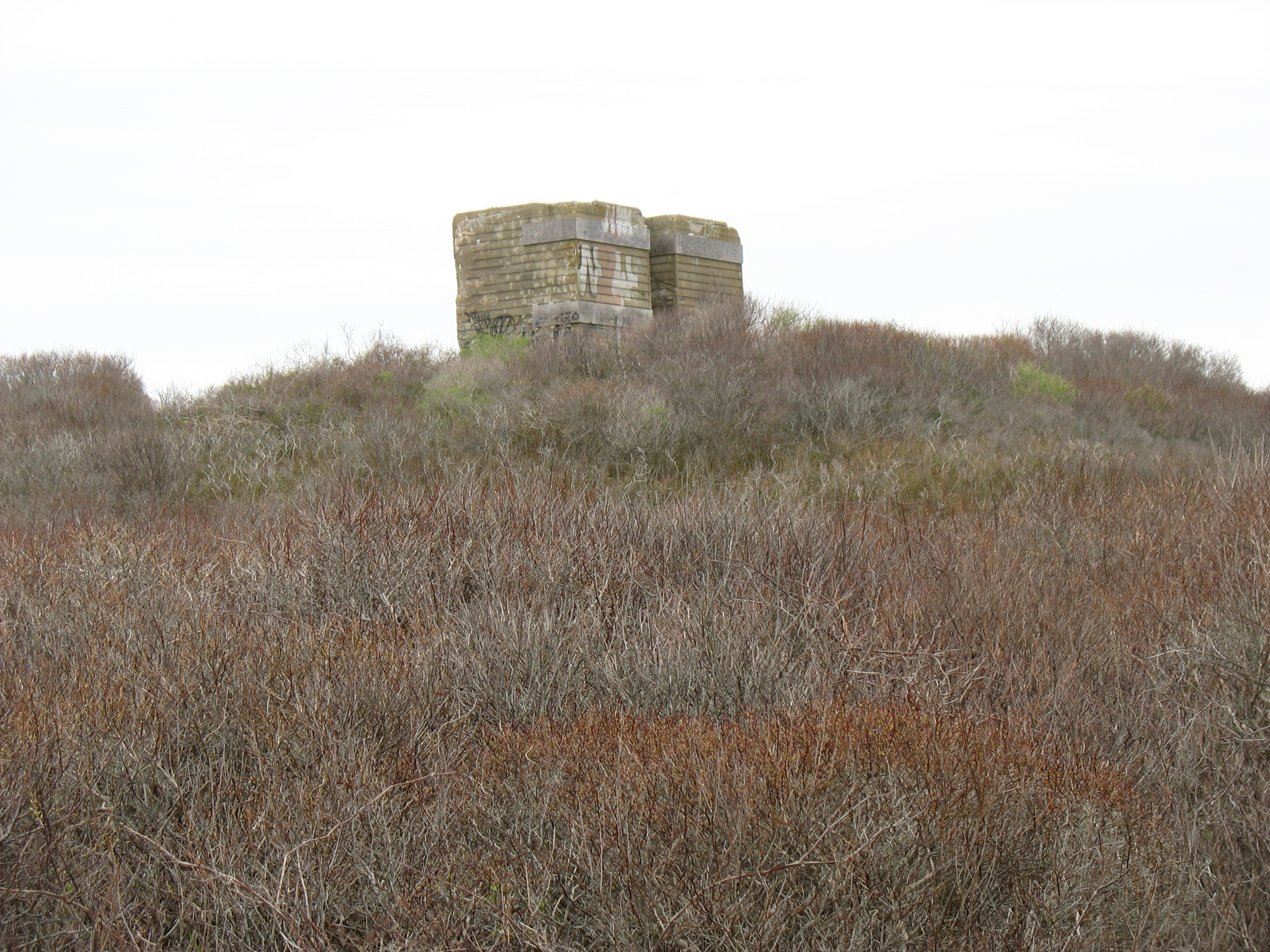
- World War II-era observation bunker rising above the shadbush at Shadmoor State Park

- Location within New York
- Type: State park
- Location: 900 Montauk Highway; Montauk, New York
- Nearest city: Montauk, New York
- Coordinates: 41°02′14″N 71°55′31″W
- Area: 99 acres (40 ha)
- Created: 2000
- Operator: New York State Office of Parks, Recreation and Historic Preservation
- Visitors: 131,318 (in 2024)
- Open: All year
- Website: Shadmoor State Park

Shadmoor State Park is a 99-acre (40 ha) state park located in Suffolk County, New York in the United States. Created in 2000, the park is located in Town of East Hampton on the South Fork of Long Island, one-quarter mile (0.40 km) east of the hamlet of Montauk.

== History ==
Prior to becoming a park, the land was used as part of the coastal defense system for New York City during World War II. Two concrete observation bunkers from that time remain visible at the site. It was also part of Camp Wikoff where troops led by Theodore Roosevelt were quarantined after the Spanish–American War.

Attempts to purchase the land to preserve it as a public park had been ongoing for years prior to the park's creation in 2000. After the previous owners won approval to subdivide their property into several residential lots, preservation efforts intensified. The parkland was purchased in October 2000 for $17.7 million, with the cost split between New York State ($5.6 million), the Town of East Hampton ($5.5 million), Suffolk County ($5.4 million), and The Nature Conservancy ($1 million).

== Park description ==
The park, maintained by the Long Island Region of the New York State Office of Parks, Recreation and Historic Preservation, features more than 2,400 feet (730 m) of beach and 100-foot (30 m) bluffs along the Atlantic Ocean. The park is largely undeveloped, and has no infrastructure beyond elevated platforms for birdwatching and trails for hiking, biking, and cross-country skiing. The park also offers accessibility for salt water fishing.

Shadmoor State Park derives its name from the thick shadbush (Amelanchier) found growing atop the bluffs. Also found growing in the park are black cherry trees (Prunus serotina) and the endangered sandplain gerardia (Agalinis acuta).

== See also ==
- List of New York state parks
