= Arthur W. Benson =

Arthur W. Benson (c.1798–1889) was a president of Brooklyn Gas Light who developed the New York City suburbs of Bensonhurst and Montauk.

Benson founded the Brooklyn Gas Light company in 1823, when Brooklyn had 9,000 people.

He began buying farmland that was formerly owned by the Polhemuses family in 1835. Between 1830 and 1850 Benson divided the farmland into lots that were sold in the newly created suburb of Bensonhurst.

In 1869 Benson was one of only nine individual investors in the Brooklyn Bridge with the first planning meetings held at the Brooklyn Gas Light headquarters.

In 1879 Benson paid US$151,000 for 10,000 acres (40 km^{2}) of government land around Montauk in an auction (with Benson paying 10% down). In the middle of the land was Indian Field which was the home for the Montaukett tribe. The land had been held in trust for the tribe. Benson moved to get clear title to the land with promises of buying it from tribesmen for $10 each; in one case one of the tribesmen houses was burned. The legitimacy of the transaction is still being contested in court by the tribe. The transaction cleared the way for Austin Corbin to bring the Long Island Rail Road to Montauk with the first train pulling on December 17, 1895.

Benson envisioned the Montauk area as a playground for the rich. Stanford White and his McKim, Mead, and White firm designed seven houses at the Ditch Plains area of Montauk. Frederick Law Olmsted and his sons designed a private park system. Tick Hall, one of the houses owned by television personality Dick Cavett, was destroyed by a 1997 fire. Its reconstruction was followed in a Public Television documentary.

== See also ==
- Montauk Point land claim
