= Montaukett =

Native northeastern American people

Regions with significant populations
- United States (Long Island)

Languages
- English, formerly Mohegan-Pequot

Religion
- Christianity, Native

Related ethnic groups
- Shinnecock, Pequot, Narragansett, Algonquin, Lenape

The Montaukett, more commonly known as Montauk, are an Algonquian-speaking Native American people from the eastern and central sections of Long Island, New York, United States.

== Name ==
The exact meaning of the name Montauk is unknown, although it derives from a place name in the Mohegan-Montauk-Narragansett language; it roughly translates to "the fort country." The Montaukett were Native Americans on Long Island. Their bands were often referred to in colonial writings by the place name of their geographic territories, such as the Montauk and the Shinnecock peoples, which may or may not have been the same as their name for themselves. European colonists tended to mistakenly assume that the different bands they encountered were different tribes, even in cases where the bands clearly shared the same culture and language.

== Anthropology ==
=== Language ===
The Montaukett are an Algonquian-speaking Native American people from the eastern and central sections of Long Island, New York. The Montauk spoke an Eastern Algonquian language. Prior to the 17th century, the Montauk people spoke the Mohegan-Pequot language, also known as the Algonquian "N" dialect, until about 1600 when they moved to the "Y" dialect.

On March 25, 1798, John Lyon Gardiner wrote:

“March 25, 1798. A vocabulary of the Indian language spoken by the Montauk tribe. George Pharoah, aged 66, oldest man of that tribe and their chief gave me this specimen of their language. There are only about seven persons that can now speak this language and a few years more and it will be gone forever. It was spoken with little difference by all the Indians upon the East end of Long Island and perhaps the whole Island and the adjoining Islands. George says the Moheags of Connecticut speak the same language. George repeated these words several times and I write them as near as he pronounced as I can with the English alphabet.”

=== Class, race, and ethnicity ===
The Native Americans of the east end of the Island shared a common culture with each other and with Lenape groups along most of the northern shore of what is now called Long Island Sound. The Montauk are specifically related in language and ethnicity to the Pequot and Narragansett peoples who live across Long Island Sound in what are now Connecticut and Rhode Island. American ethnologist John R. Swanton identified the following subdivisions of the Montauk: Corehaug, Manhasset, Massapequa, Matinecock, Merric, Montauk (proper), Nesaquake, Patchoque, Rockaway, Secatogue, Setauket, and Shinnecock. Swanton also identified several Montauk villages including Aquebogue, Ashamomuck, Cutchogue, Massapequa, Merric, Montauk, Nesaquake, Patchogue, and Rechquaakie.

=== Subsistence ===
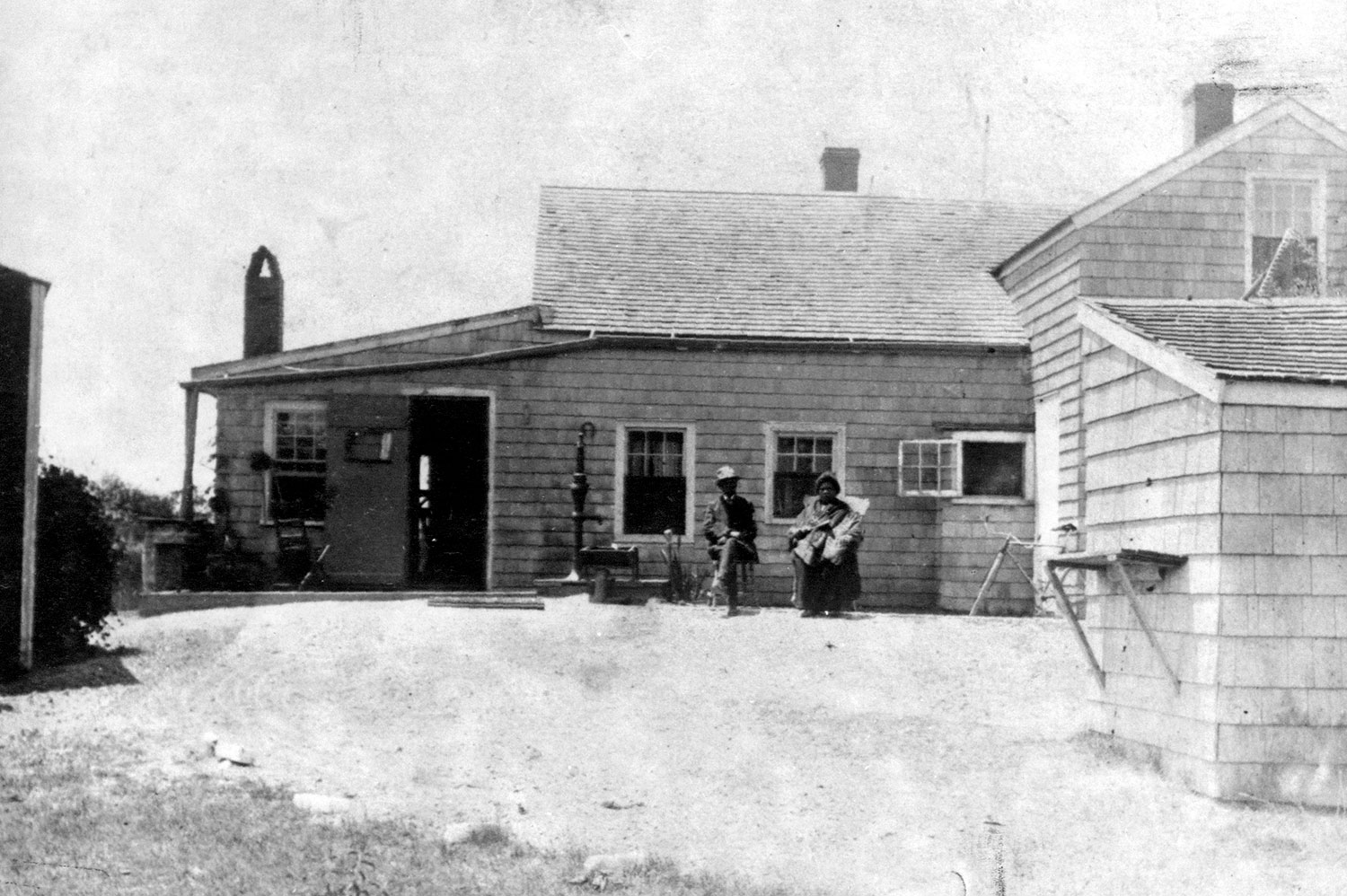

The pre-colonial Montaukett manufactured wampompeag (or wampum) from quahog clamshells available on Long Island. Before the Montaukett obtained metal awls from the Europeans, the Montaukett artisans would make "disk-shaped beads from quahog shells ... used for trade and for tribute payments" with the nearby tribes. The Montaukett farmed, fished, hunted, and gathered food. The colonial Montaukett participated in the new European economic and cultural systems by using their traditional skills: hunting to provide game and fowl for colonists' tables; woodworking to make bowls, scrubs, tools, toys, and later, houses and mills; craftwork to make baskets, eel pots, and rush and cane bottoms for chairs. The "women would harvest corn, squash, and beans." While the men fished and hunted whales, by using their dugout canoes, made by hollowing out large trees. They also participated in the economy by purchasing their guns and sometimes furniture from the local colonial craftsmen. The Montauketts skilled at whaling were eagerly sought after by those engaged in the trade. Between 1677 and 1684, a documented system of credit allowed indigenous men (and their families) to purchase goods from local merchants and traders, in exchange for their share (or “lay”) of the catch during the following whaling season. Eventually, the in-shore whaling operations over-fished the local seas, and Indigenous labor from the Montauketts and other Native American groups was vital to deep-sea whaling throughout the late eighteenth century. Even both Rev. Horton and Rev. Occum mentioned in their records (as late as ca. 1740–1760) that Montaukett men were working at sea during their visits.

== History ==
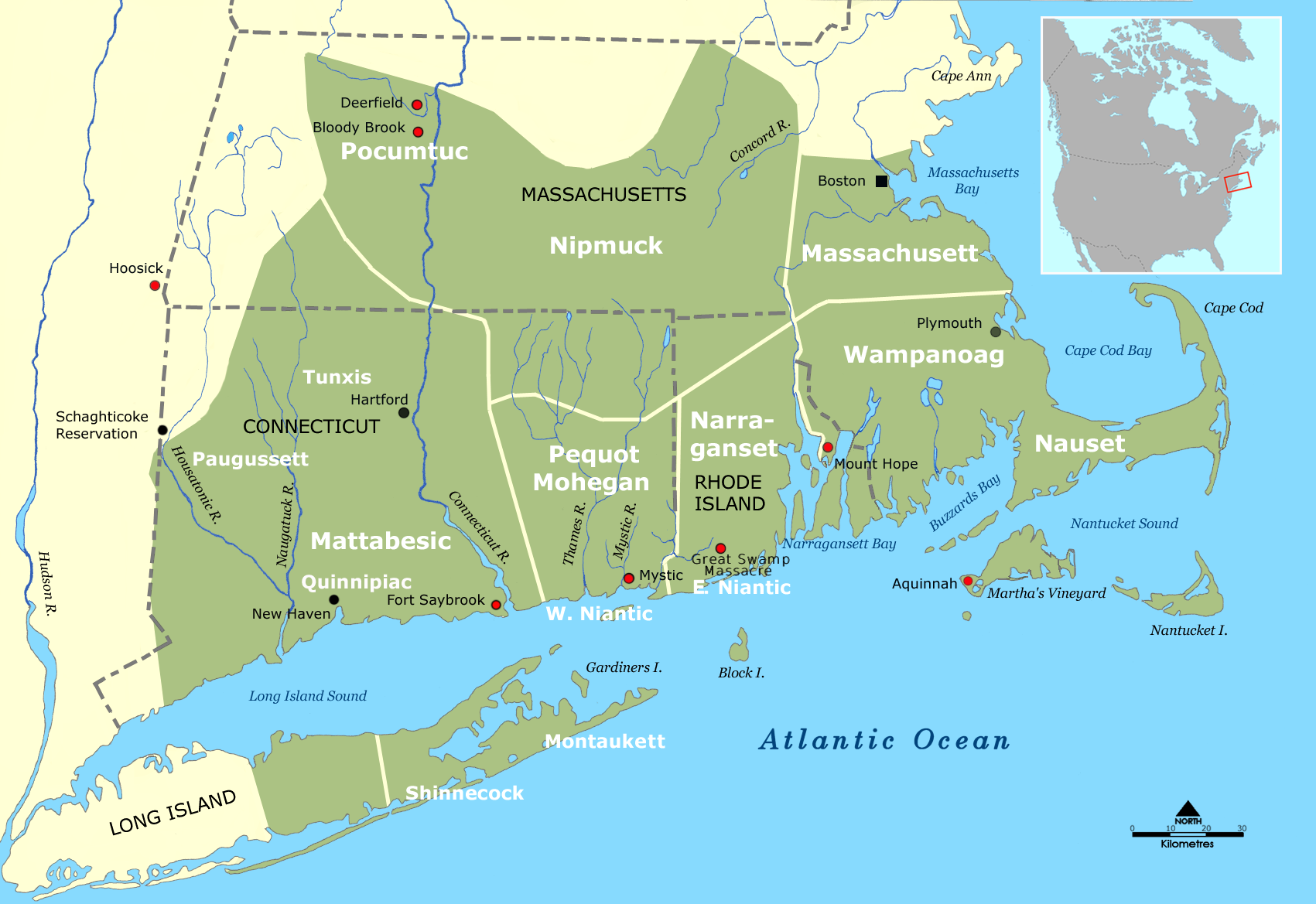
Montaukett and their neighbors, circa 1600

=== 16th century ===
In 1524, Giovanni Verrazano explored and mapped the area. It is unclear whether these specific expeditions had any contact with the Montauk tribe.

=== 17th century ===
In 1609, an expedition by Henry Hudson, explored the area. It is unclear whether these specific expeditions had any contact with the Montauk tribe.

In 1619, Adriaen Block, sailed around the point, naming it Visscher's Hoek while mapping the area around the point and nearby Block Island. It is unclear whether these specific expeditions had any contact with the Montauk tribe.

In 1637, during the Pequot War, the Montauketts sided with the settlers for protection, but Cockenoe, a Montaukett native, was captured and wound up working with John Eliot in Boston in the 1640s to translate the first parts of the Eliot Indian Bible, before returning to Long Island.

In 1639, during the aftermath of the war, settler-colonist Lion Gardiner purchased an island from the Montaukett chief Wyandanch and named it Gardiner's Island. It is one of the largest privately owned islands in the United States.

In 1648, the settlers purchased from Connecticut the lands that would become the town of East Hampton, with the western boundary of today's Hither Hills State Park (also known as the 1648 purchase line), leaving only the lands to the east of the point for the Montaukett.

Throughout the 1650s, as the white settlement was expanding, the Montaukett population was in decline. In 1653, Narragansetts under Ninigret attacked and burned the Montaukett village, killing thirty Montaukett warriors and capturing fourteen prisoners, including one of Chief Wyandanch's daughters. The daughter was recovered with the aid of Lion Gardiner, who in turn was given a large portion of present-day Smithtown, New York, in appreciation. The Montaukett, ravaged by smallpox and fearing extermination by the Narragansett, were provided temporary refuge by white settlers in East Hampton. Many short but famous battles ensued. Fort Pond Bay derives its name from a Montaukett "fort" on its shores.

After 1653, three different groups of East Hampton colonial settlers purchased Native land, each expanding East Hampton rights further and further east. Further purchase agreements were entered into in 1660, 1661, 1672 and 1686 which, among other things, allowed Easthampton townsmen to graze cattle on the Montaukett lands.

The native skirmishes ended in 1657. By 1658, historians estimate that only five hundred Montauk remained. In 1659, Montaukett Sachem Wyandanch died. The following year, Wyandanch's widow sold all of Montauk from Napeague to the tip of the island for one hundred pounds to be paid in ten equal installments of "Indian corn or good wampum at six to a penny".

In 1661, a deed was issued titled "Ye deed of Guift," which granted all lands east of Fort Pond for the common use of both the Indians and the townsmen.

In 1686, New York Governor Thomas Dongan issued a patent creating the governing system for East Hampton. The patent did not extend beyond Napeague to Montauk. This lack of authority has formed the basis for various control disputes ever since. The Dongan Patent allowed the Montauk Proprietors to purchase the remaining unpurchased lands between the ponds and east of Lake Wyandanee (Lake Montauk). This further separated the Montauketts from governing their tribal lands.

In a purchase that was finalized in 1687, in which the East Hampton town purchased the remaining Native lands east of Fort Pond for one hundred pounds, and granted the Montauketts residency rights in perpetuity (but no governance). The Montauketts agreed to accept two pounds per year instead of the lump sum of one hundred pounds, in addition to amounts that they already received yearly for grazing access. The Montaukett noted in 1702 that the fees had never been paid. Dissatisfied with their treatment by the town, the Montauketts negotiated a more lucrative sale of the same lands east of Fort Pond to two wealthy men from New York. This deal, however, violated a previous agreement between the Montauketts and the town that permitted the Town Trustees exclusive rights to the purchase of Montauk lands. The town challenged the Montaukett sale to the New York men and moved quickly to establish a new agreement with the Montauketts, detailing transactions and rights between the two parties.

=== 18th century ===
A 1703 agreement included a limit on Montaukett livestock to 250 swine and 50 head of cattle or horses. The subsequent 1703 “Agreement Between the Trustees of East Hampton and the Indians of Montauk” (reprinted in Stone 1993:69) specified that the Montauketts were to inhabit the land referred to as North Neck (between Great Pond and Fort Pond), establishing fencing where necessary. The land east of Great Pond (including Indian Fields) was reserved for colonial use, which primarily consisted of cattle grazing. The Montauketts were permitted to move east of Great Pond if they did not interfere with the colonists's right to graze. The agreement also specified how the Montauketts were able to use their land: fields were expected to remain open for livestock owned by colonists grazing and they were permitted to keep a 30-acre field enclosed to protect crops of winter wheat. If the Montauketts were to move from North Neck and relocate to Indian Fields, they must take possessions with them; they could return to North Neck, but not inhabit both locations concurrently.

In 1719, despite the enforced limitations on lifeways, the Montaukett population grew in small numbers and reinforced social and economic networks through exogamous marriage practices. The colonial government responded to this threat of an expanding Montaukett population with yet another “agreement” that prohibited Montaukett marriages with non-Montauketts. Altogether, these eighteenth-century encumbrances left the Montauketts, resentful of their white neighbors, in a position of tenancy on their ancestral homelands.

During and after the 1730 - 1740 First Great Awakening, the Montauketts received attention from New Light preachers, most notably James Davenport and Azariah Horton. The Settler colonists continued to pursue an idea of making the Montauketts become Christianized and therefore integrated into society by having the Rev. Azarlah Horton, originally of Southold, to minister to them from 1740 to about 1750. Staying and preaching in their wigwams, the reverend traveled a circuit from Jamaica to Montauk, but spending most of his time at Montauk. In a diary entry from December 1741, Rev. Horton mentioned visiting the wigwams of Montaukett people in Montauk who were suffering from illnesses.

By the 1740s, the population was around 160 people.

In 1749, Samson Occom a Mohegan Native American of Connecticut, came to Montauk to minister and to educate them (from 1749-1761), and began to take over Azariah Horton’s mission, while Rev. Horton eventually left for New Jersey. Rev. Occom was an exceptionally talented man, not formally educated until 16, but mastering English, Greek, and Latin, as well as theology beginning in 1743. Later he was ordained a Presbyterian minister by East Hampton's Rev. Samuel Buell.

Around 1759, the Narragansett attacked the Montauk, until the latter sought refuge with white colonists in Easthampton. Disease had greatly reduced their population.

In 1773, Samson Occum and his brother-in-law, David Fowler (c. 1735-1807, Montaukett native) form the "Brothertown Plan" with members of the neighboring Shinnecock and Christian Algonquins, including contingents of the Mohegan, Pequot, and Narragansett, to move them to the Oneida Territory. They moved from Long Island to escape colonial encroachment.

In 1784, the Brotherton were forced to move westward (and throughout the United States), ending up in Wisconsin, founding a town they named Brothertown, and became the Brothertown Indian Tribe. They have married into many of the northeastern native tribes and live on many reservations throughout the country. Today they are part of the Brothertown Indians movement.

By 1788, most Montaukett had left their ancestral lands and joined the Brotherton Indians of New York. The attempts at assimilation continued for some time afterwards for those who stayed behind when the Brothertown group left.

=== 19th century ===
Off-shore and deep-sea whaling operations continued into the 19th century even though exploitative labor practices continued. Still, not all Indigenous men in southern New England faced coercion, debt, and indentured servitude in seafaring. Through the 19th century, whaling ships often included tri-racial and multi-national crews. White, Indigenous, and African-American seamen encountered sailors from international ports as vessels travelled for sometimes years at a time.

In 1830 while the Rev. Thomas James (minister, born 1804) was in Sag Harbor on an anti-slavery ministry for the free black former slaves in the whaling industry, he was engaged to preach to the Montauketts too. The Reverend James gave the Montauketts shelter near the village during their problems with the Narragansett, and allegedly got them to sell from Napeague to Montauk Point to himself and a few other men (maybe Hedges / Benson / et al. ?). Rev. James allegedly composed a Catechism In the Montauk language, a variant of Mohegan-Pequot, which has never been found.

From 1830 to 1920, Indigenous whalers went to work as free agents. Indigenous men voluntarily went to sea, as viable alternatives to mainland and reservation opportunities and Indigenous men from eastern Long Island continued to work in whaling through the early 20th century.

In 1839, slaves who had seized the schooner La Amistad came ashore in the hamlet (possibly "Indian Fields") looking for provisions after being told by the white crew they had returned to Africa. American authorities were alerted, and the slaves were recaptured and ultimately freed in a historically significant trial.

In 1851 a judgment was entered against the Trustees of the Freeholders and Commonalty of the Town of Easthampton and on March 9, 1852 a deed to Montauk was entered at Riverhead in liber 63 of deeds p. 171 to plaintiffs Henry P. Hedges and others including Arthur W. Benson, the claimant equitable owners of Montauk (Proprietors), because their predecessors had contributed the money to purchase Montauk from the native Montaukett Indians in the 1600s. Mr. Hedges (with Benson, and others) paid US$151,000 for 10,000 acres (40 km^{2}) for the east end. The deed releasing claim to Montauk was entered on March 9, 1852. Mr. Benson also received clear title to the Montaukett property at Big Reed Pond, buying it from tribesmen for $10 each. This deed caused the lands covered by the Dongan Patent to be split, leaving the still unsettled lands at Montauk without government. Less than one month later, on April 2, 1852, a NY state law was passed that incorporated the Proprietors Montauks, establishing the corporation of the trustees of Montauk and affirming its right to govern.

The 1859 discovery of petroleum in Pennsylvania, along with the growing demand for kerosene and the onset of the Civil War, led to the start of the demise of whaling.

Montaukett men sailed from ships out of Sag Harbor until 1871, a year that marked the final deep-sea departure from the port. After 1871, Montaukett men sailed out of New Bedford. Men of all backgrounds left whaling for employment in factories.

In 1879, an extension of the Long Island Railroad began construction to Montauk. This potential increasing tourism sparked the idea of the sale of the entire Montauk peninsula by the Town Trustees to Arthur W. Benson in 1879 for development as a resort. Mr. Benson began buying up any additional available land in the area with an eye to future development. The entirety of Montauk that was not already owned by Mr. Benson was eventually sold in 1890 to Mr. Benson "subject to the rights of the Montauk tribe of indians," noting that a few members and their families still survived. According to Marla Pharoah's autobiography, the remaining Montaukett families were allegedly contestibly "bought out" and two of those houses were moved off Montauk to Freetown, while the others were simply burned down and all their possessions stolen.

The first train from the Austin Corbin extension of the Long Island Rail Road pulled into Montauk in 1895, (to the station built in fort pond bay) the land having been bought in 1882.

A court case was begun by the Montauketts In 1896 to regain their land: It continued until 1917 and bankrupted them.

In 1898, after the Benson / Corbin plan did not work out as planned, the United States Army bought the Benson property to establish a base called Camp Wikoff to quarantine Army personnel returning from the Spanish–American War – and that's how Teddy Roosevelt and His Rough Riders wound up exposed to the few remaining Montauketts as they stayed in what became known as "Third House."

=== 20th century ===
In 1906; Amid their court case, New York State passed legislation to enable the Montaukett to establish land claims through colonial deeds from 1660 through 1702, but, as a result of the court battle, the Montaukett lost their legal status and right to compensation, and Judge Abel Blackmar declared to more than 20 Montauketts in the courtroom and scores waiting outside that the tribe had ceased to exist and that they had therefore lost their claim to the reservation. This was probably the proverbial straw that broke the camel's back for a while at least.

In 1910, there were an estimated 29 Montauk on Long Island, and in 1923, there were 30.

In 1924, Robert Moses began condemning the Benson land to establish state parks on either end of Montauk − Hither Hills State Park in the west and Montauk Point State Park in the east. The two parks were to be connected via the Montauk Point State Parkway.(State Route 27)

In 1926, Carl G. Fisher bought all of the remaining (non-state park) Montaukett Lands in Long Island (10,000 acres (40 km^{2})) for only $2.5 million. He planned to turn Montauk into the "Miami Beach of the North", a "Tudor village by the sea". His projects included blasting a hole through the freshwater Lake Montauk to access Block Island Sound to replace the shallow Fort Pond Bay as the hamlet's port; establishing the Montauk Yacht Club and the Montauk Downs Golf Course; and building Montauk Manor, a luxury resort hotel; the Montauk Tennis Auditorium, which became a movie theater (and is now the Montauk Playhouse); and the six-story Carl Fisher Office Building (later the Montauk Improvement Building and now The Tower at Montauk, (commonly called the "white elephant") now a residential condominium).

In the Great Hurricane of 1938, water flooded across Napeague, turning Montauk into an island. Floodwaters from the hurricane inundated the main downtown, which was then located in fort pond bay, and it was moved 3 miles (5 km) to the south, immediately next to the Atlantic Ocean, with State Route 27 as the main drag.

==== Current status ====
Currently, there is no state or federally recognized Montauk tribe. The Montauk Tribe of Indians (as known as the Montauk Indian Nation) and the Montaukett Tribe of Long Island, both unrecognized tribes, submitted letters of intent to petition for federal recognition in the 1990s; however, neither has followed through with submitting a petition. Assemblyman Fred Thiele Jr. has introduced legislation to restore state recognition of the Montaukett Indian Nation in 2013, 2017, 2018, and 2019, but Governor Andrew M. Cuomo vetoed these bills, "arguing that a tribe must follow a prescribed federal administrative process to obtain recognition rather than achieve it through setting up a costly duplicated process at the state level." The last 2019–20 bill, sponsored by Senator Kenneth LaValle died after being referred to state senate investigations and government operations.

The Montaukett Tribe of Indians continues to petition for federal recognition. Today, the Montauk Tribe of Indians is trying to reverse the 1910 Blackmar decision and working to revitalize the Montauk language and culture.

In 2022, a bill to acknowledge the tribe was passed by the New York State Legislature for the fourth time, and Governor Kathy Hochul vetoed it in December 2022.

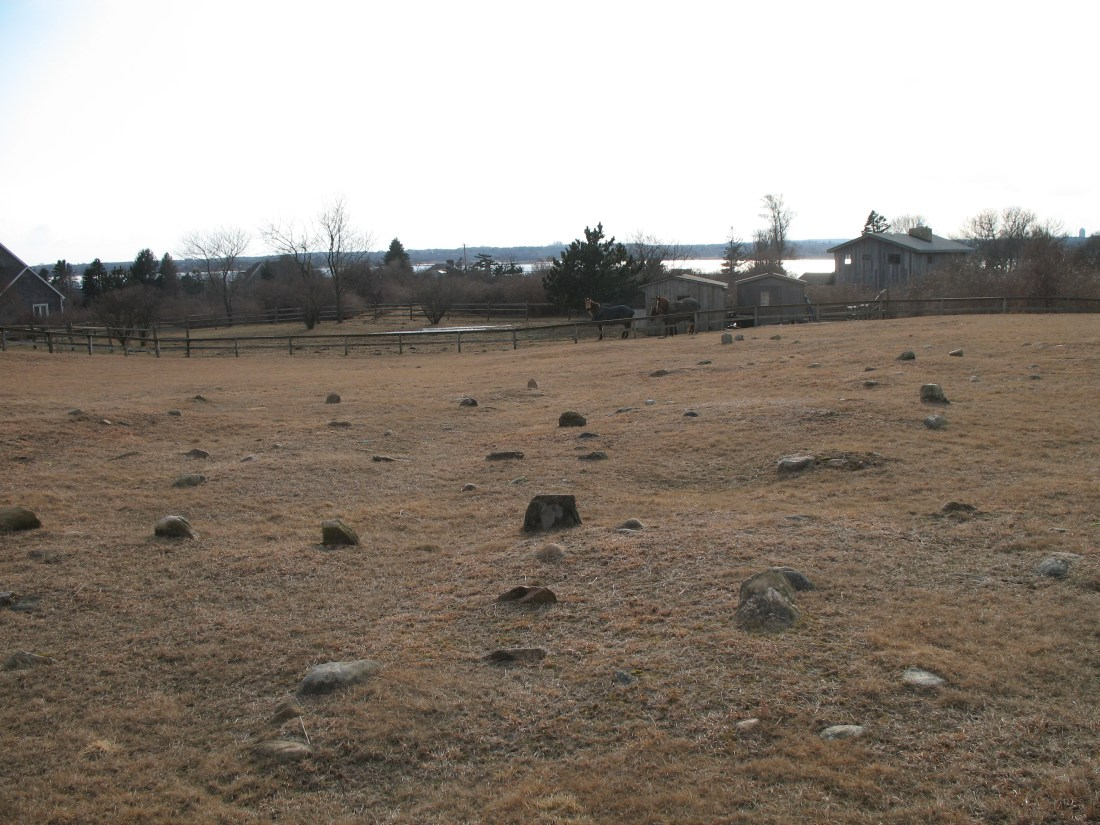
Montaukett graves - most notable is Stephen Talkhouse

== Archaeology ==
Allison Manfra McGovern who studied the archeology of the Montauketts over time (ca. 1750–1885) wrote a dissertation about two houses at Indian Fields compared to Freetown. Manfra McGovern concluded that "...despite the seemingly remote location of Indian Fields, Montaukett men and women were deeply entangled in local and global markets as producers and consumers; and they maintained social relationships with other laborers, employers, and kin throughout and beyond the East Hampton Town...".

Additionally, Stonybrook University puts forth some similarly interesting cultural observations when they studied the Pharoah Home(s) also at Indian Fields (Institute for Long Island Archaeology, Stony Brook University).

Some Relics and ruins of their settlements are visible at the Theodore Roosevelt County Park, on the edge of the village of Montauk, New York.

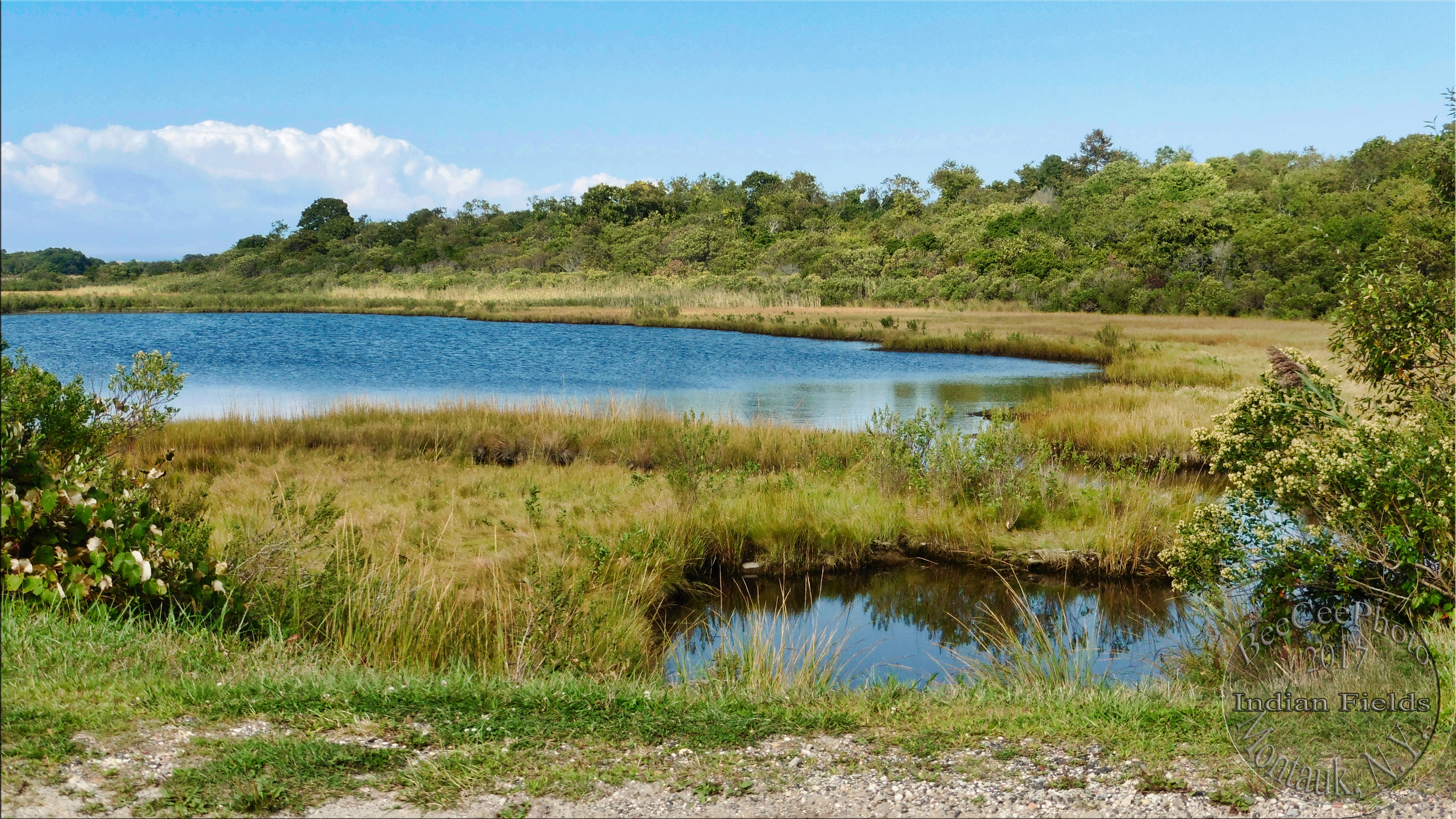
Indian Fields Big Reed Nature Trail - the last reservation...

=== Descendants ===
Historically, some of the Montaukett remained in the area in and around Montauk, chiefly because the land was often considered inaccessible. But over time, the Montauketts were increasingly dispersed from the last "reservation" at the tip of Montauk peninsula, to enclaves in Freetown (a multicultural neighborhood north of E.Hampton), Eastville (eastern Sag Harbor), the Shinnecock Reservation, and were appearing, (through the Federal censuses) in Southampton, East Hampton, Sag Harbor, Southold, Greenport, Brookhaven Town, Smithtown, Oyster Bay, and New York City – and other areas of Long Island and the nation – usually as laborers, farmhands, domestic servants, seamstresses, etc. Many Montauk descendants today live in Wisconsin (Brotherton Tribe), while others live on the Shinnecock Reservation.

== See also ==
=== Notable Montaukett people ===
- Sachem Mongotucksee (Long Knife) (c. 1550–1595)
- Cockenoe, (born before 1630 and died after 1687) early translator for the Eliot Indian Bible, the first Bible printed in America
- Grand Sachem Chief Wyandanch (c. 1620–1659); Wyandanch, New York is named after him.
- Quashawam, leader of the Montauketts and the daughter of Wyandanch
- Samson Occom (1723 – July 14, 1792), co-created the Brotherton Plan
- David Fowler (c. 1735-1807), co-created the Brotherton Plan
- Stephen Talkhouse (Stephen Taukus "Talkhouse" Pharaoh, c. 1821–1879)
- Olivia Ward Bush-Banks (née Ward; February 27, 1869 – April 8, 1944), African American–Montaukett author, poet, and journalist

=== Further reading ===
- Indigenous peoples of Long Island
- Montauk Point land claim
- John Lyon Gardiner
- Tribal sovereignty in the United States
- Shinnecock Reservation
- Praying town
