= Montauk Point State Park =

State park in New York, United States

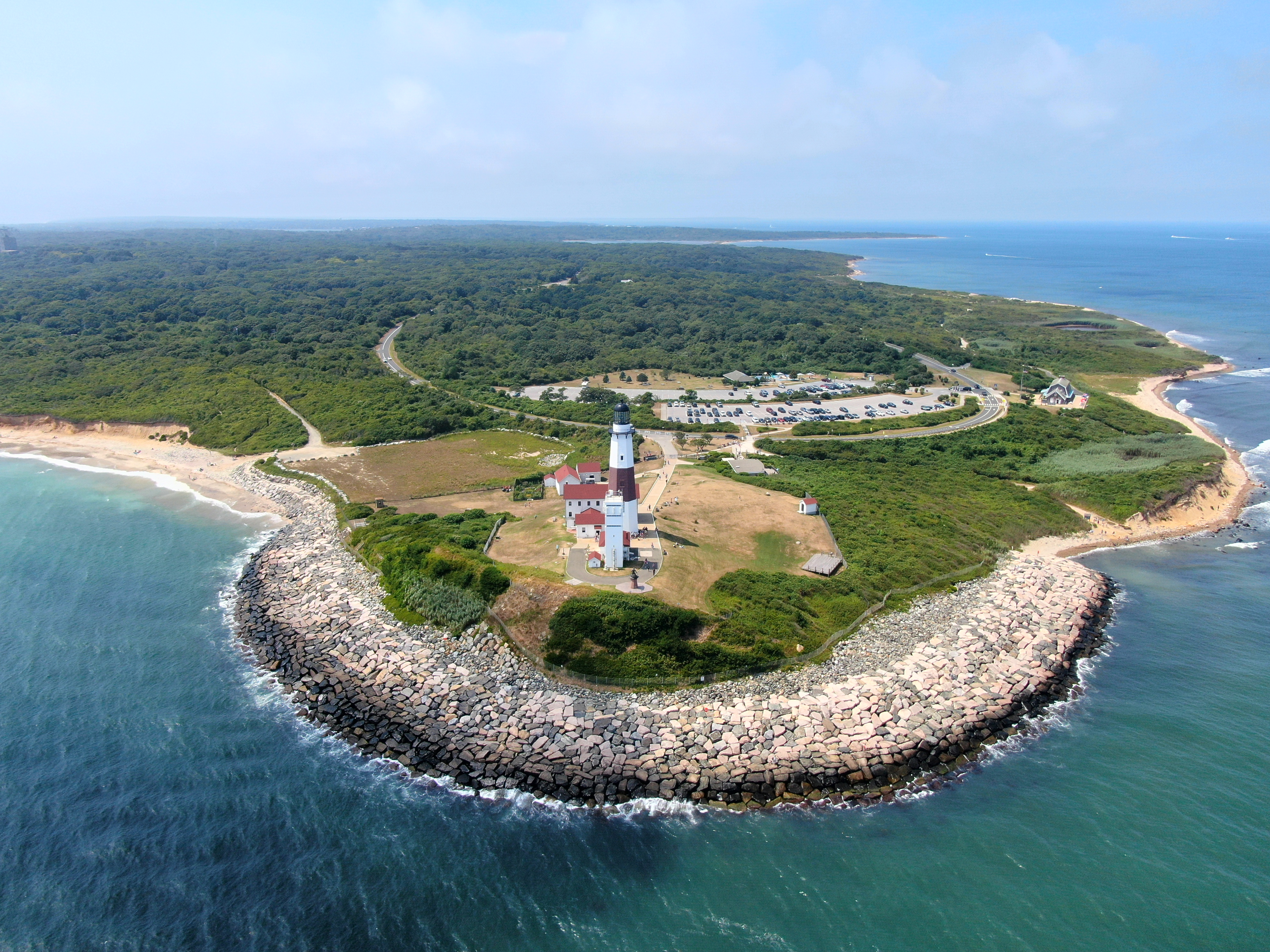
- Aerial view of the Montauk Point Light and Montauk Point State Park in August 2025.

- Location within New York
- Type: State park
- Location: 2000 Montauk Highway; Montauk, New York
- Nearest city: Montauk, New York
- Coordinates: 41°04′12″N 71°51′18″W
- Area: 3.49 square kilometres (1.35 sq mi)
- Operator: New York State Office of Parks, Recreation and Historic Preservation
- Visitors: 1,247,933 (in 2024)
- Open: All year
- Website: Montauk Point State Park

Montauk Point State Park is a 3.49-square-kilometre (1.35 sq mi) state park located in the hamlet of Montauk, at the eastern tip of Long Island in the Town of East Hampton, Suffolk County, New York. Montauk Point is the easternmost point of the South Fork of Long Island, and thus also of New York State.

== History ==
The park contains the Montauk Point Light, which was authorized by the Second Congress, under President George Washington in 1792. Construction began on June 7, 1796 and was completed on November 5, 1796. The lighthouse and adjacent Camp Hero were heavily fortified with huge guns during World War I and World War II. Those gun emplacements and concrete observation bunkers (which are also at nearby Shadmoor State Park and Camp Hero State Park) are still visible.

Amistad, a Spanish ship taken over by slaves in 1839, was captured by Washington near Montauk Point. The slaves were allowed to briefly disembark here before being re-imprisoned and taken to New London, Connecticut for trial. The Amistad case was heard before the Supreme Court of the United States, where John Quincy Adams successfully argued that the slaves had been kidnapped. Following the trial, the slaves were permitted to return to Africa. The case fanned the debate over the abolition of slavery.

== Park description ==
Montauk Point State Park features picnic tables, a food concession, playground, fishing, seasonal hunting, and trails for hiking and cross-country skiing.

Suffolk Transit's S94 route also serves the park seasonally connecting it with Montauk Village. The park is located at the end of New York State Route 27.

== In Literature ==
A memory of this district is related in Lydia Sigourney's poem Montauk Point, published in her Scenes in my Native Land, 1845.

== Image gallery ==
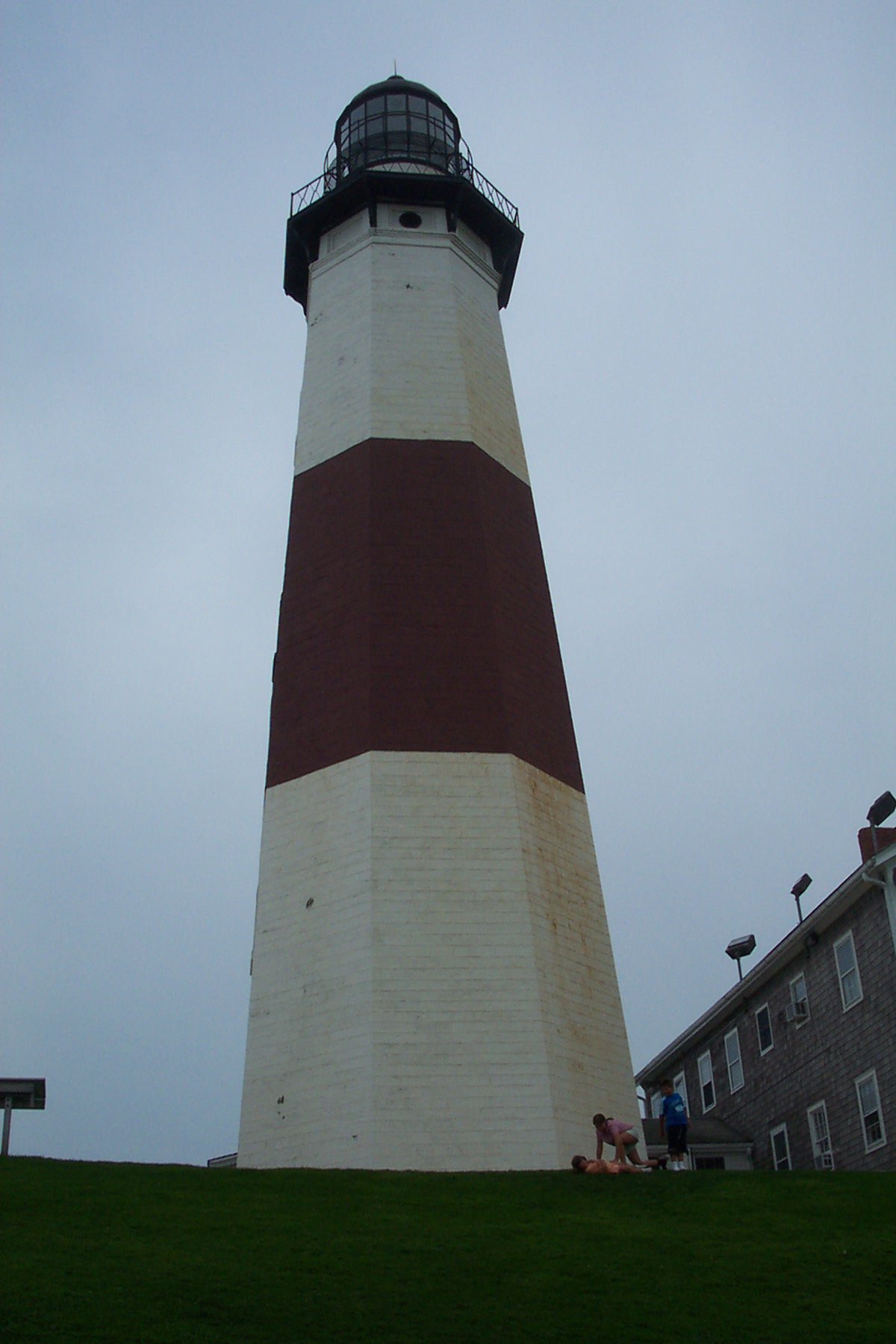
Montauk Point Light

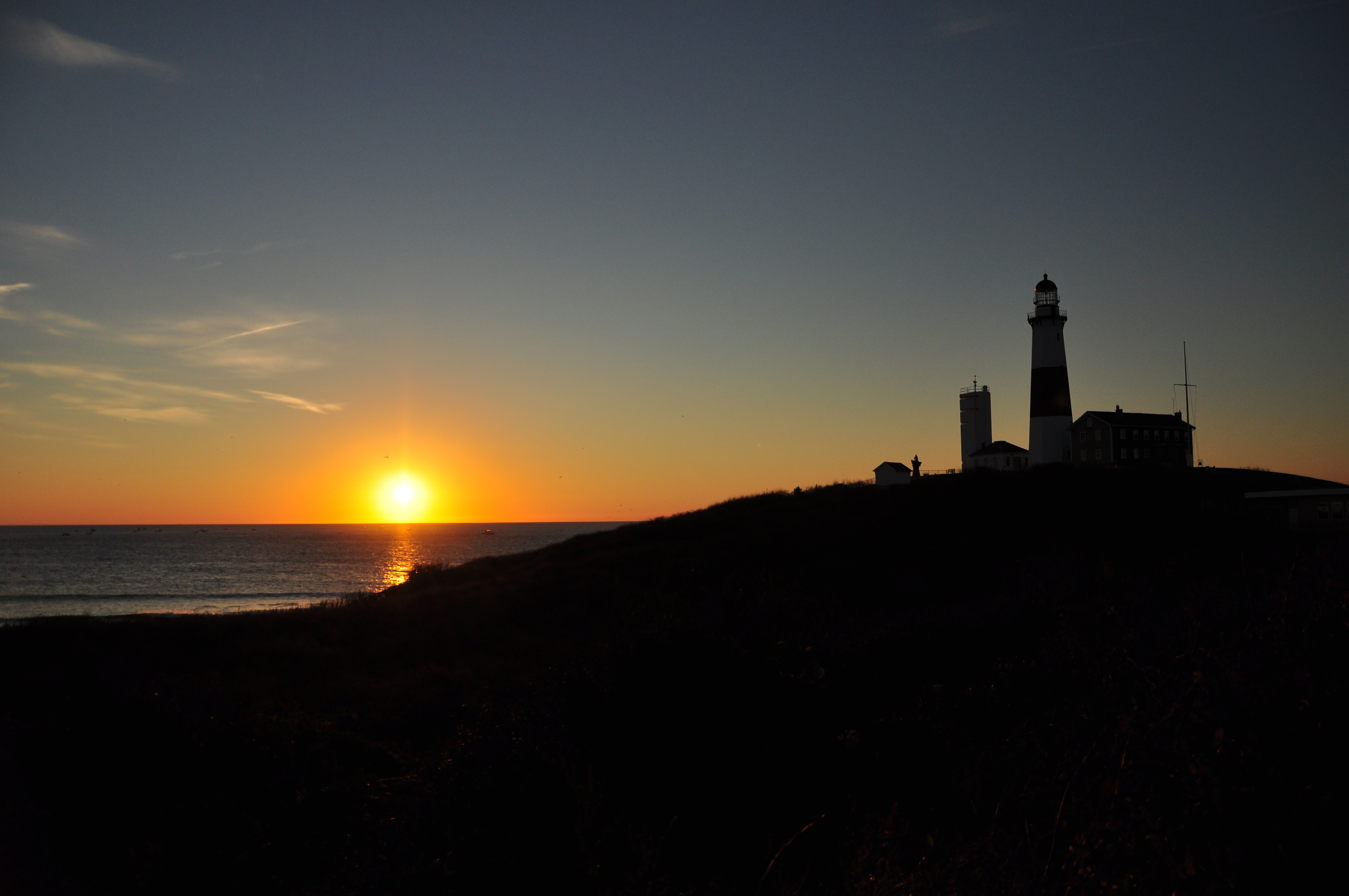
Montauk Light at sunrise

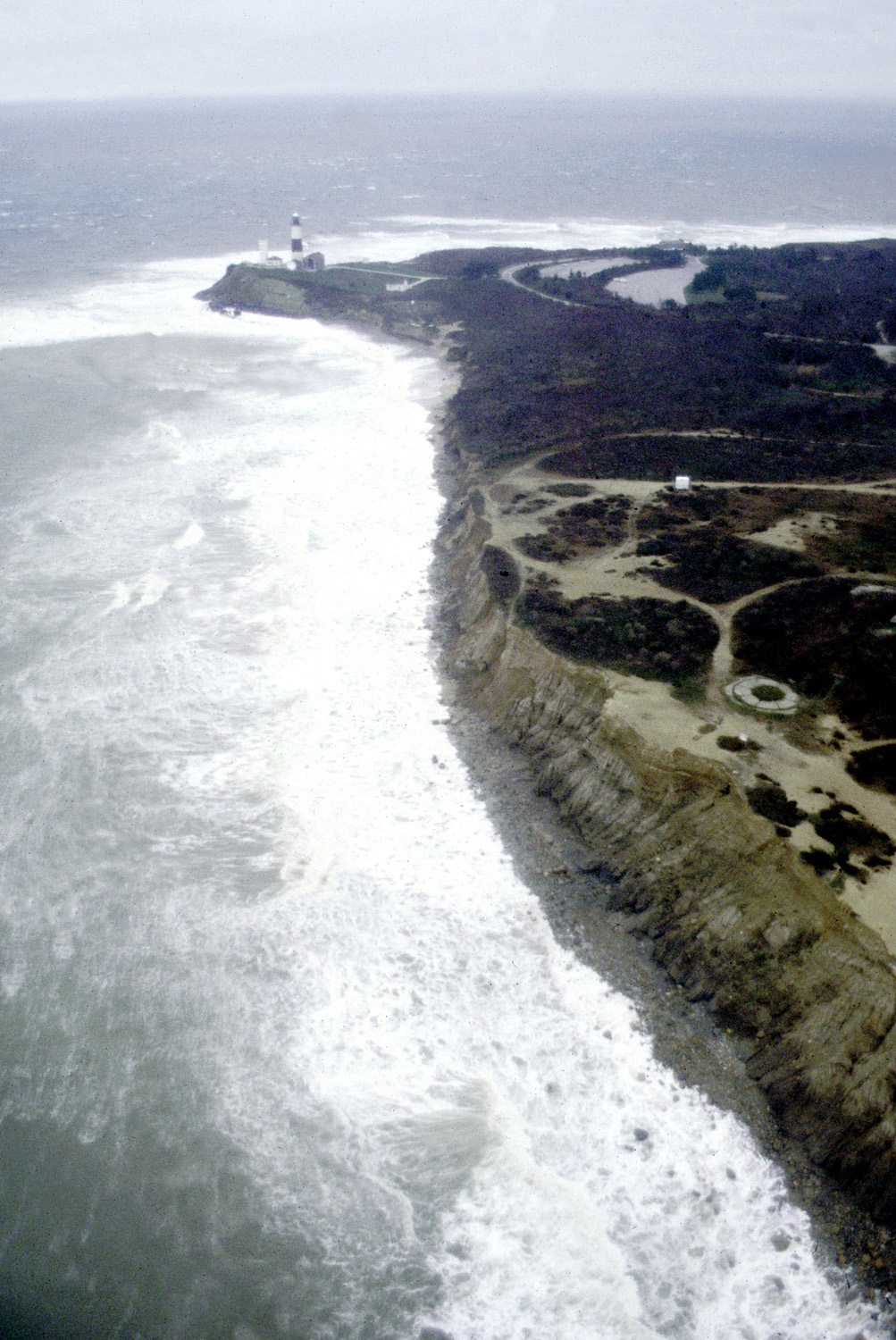
Montauk Point Light in stormy weather

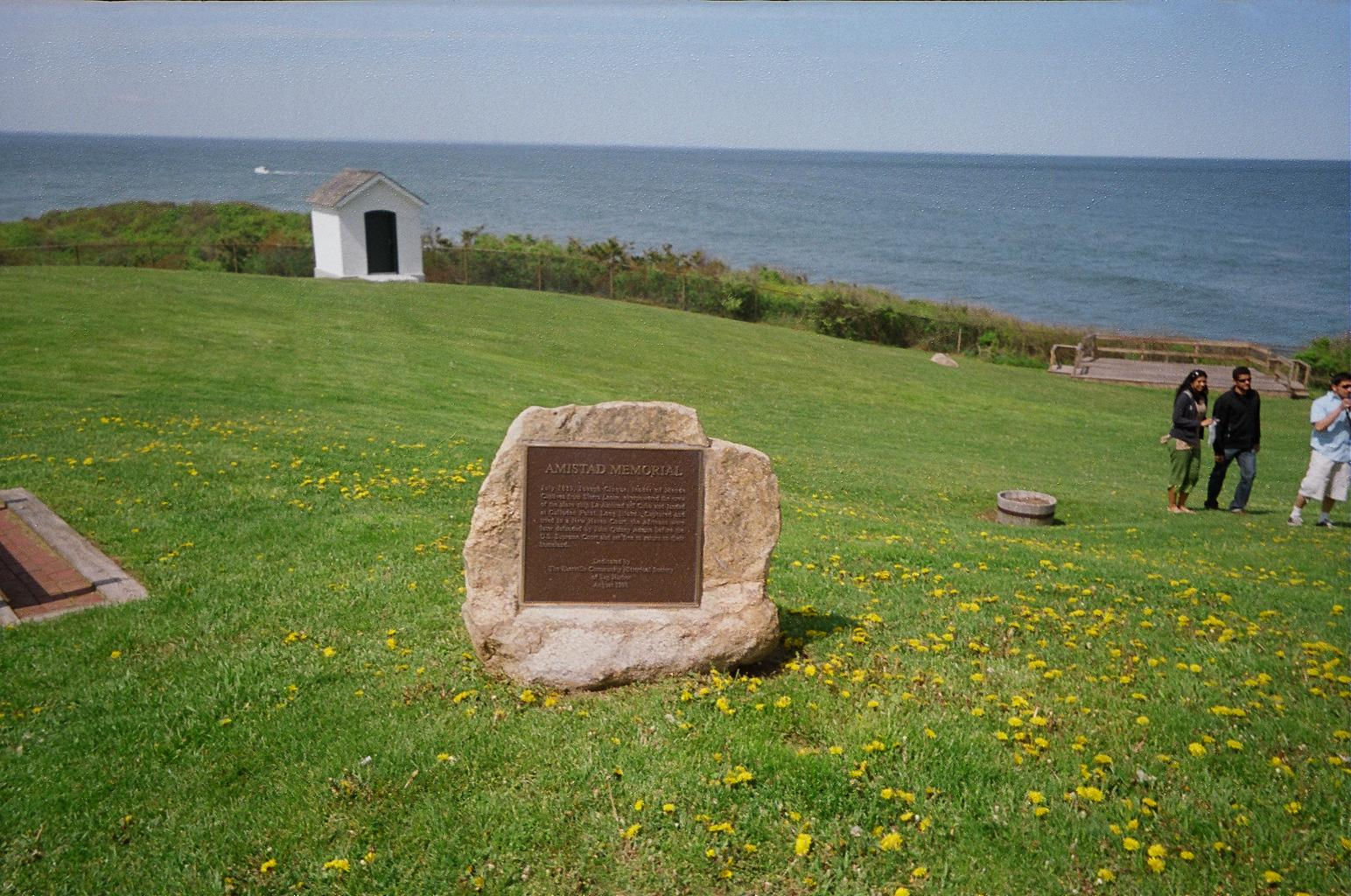
Amistad Memorial

== See also ==
- List of New York state parks
- Lighthouses in the United States
- Montauk Point land claim
