= National Register of Historic Places listings in East Hampton (town), New York =

This list is intended to provide a comprehensive listing of entries in the National Register of Historic Places in the Town of East Hampton, New York. The locations of National Register properties for which the latitude and longitude coordinates are included below, may be seen in an online map.

== Listings ==
	Name on the Register	Image	Date listed	Location	City or town	Description
1	Amagansett U.S. Life-Saving and Coast Guard Station	Amagansett U.S. Life-Saving and Coast Guard Station	July 27, 2018 (#100002743)	160 Atlantic Ave. 40°58′13″N 72°07′31″W	Amagansett	One of 20 such stations built by 1902 using the Quonochontaug Type; station's agents played a key role in 1942 interception of German saboteurs.
2	AN/FPS-35 Radar Tower and Antenna	AN/FPS-35 Radar Tower and Antenna	June 4, 2002 (#02000615)	Montauk Point State Parkway; 41°03′45″N 71°52′28″W	Montauk	Only surviving long-range radar station of 12 built by Sperry Corporation in the 1960s
3	Caleb Bragg Estate	Caleb Bragg Estate	November 2, 1987 (#87001895)	Star Island Road; 41°04′19″N 71°56′02″W	Montauk	
4	Briar Patch Road Historic District	Briar Patch Road Historic District	July 21, 1988 (#88001029)	End of Briar Patch Road along Georgica Pond; 40°56′33″N 72°13′41″W	East Hampton	
5	Buell's Lane Historic District	Buell's Lane Historic District	July 21, 1988 (#88001027)	47-114 Buell's Lane; 40°57′33″N 72°11′56″W	East Hampton	
6	Cedar Island Lighthouse	Cedar Island Lighthouse	April 18, 2003 (#03000248)	Cedar Point Road; 41°02′26″N 72°15′39″W	Northwest Harbor	
7	Elaine de Kooning House and Studio	Elaine de Kooning House and Studio	January 26, 2022 (#100007372)	55 Alewive Brook Rd. 41°01′15″N 72°13′02″W	East Hampton	The home and studio of abstract expressionist artist Elaine de Kooning, a hub of artistic innovation during a critical phase of her career.
8	East Hampton Railroad Station	East Hampton Railroad Station	June 2, 2000 (#00000581)	Railroad Avenue, between Race and Newtown Lanes; 40°58′00″N 72°11′36″W	East Hampton	
9	East Hampton Village District	East Hampton Village District	May 2, 1974 (#74001309)	Bounded by Main Street and James and Woods Lanes; 40°57′17″N 72°11′28″W	East Hampton	
10	Egypt Lane Historic District	Egypt Lane Historic District	July 21, 1988 (#88001031)	111, 117, and 129 Egypt Lane; 40°57′30″N 72°10′39″W	East Hampton	
11	Gardiners Island Windmill	Gardiners Island Windmill	December 27, 1978 (#78001912)	On Gardiners Island; 41°05′28″N 72°06′40″W	Gardiners Island	
12	Hayground Windmill	Hayground Windmill	December 27, 1978 (#78001913)	At Windmill Lane; 40°57′17″N 72°09′57″W	East Hampton	
13	H.M.S. CULLODEN Shipwreck Site	H.M.S. CULLODEN Shipwreck Site	March 5, 1979 (#79003795)	Culloden Point; 41°04′13″N 71°57′36″W	Montauk	
14	Hook Windmill	Hook Windmill	December 27, 1978 (#78001914)	North Main Street; 40°57′56″N 72°11′02″W	East Hampton	
15	Jericho Historic District	Jericho Historic District	July 21, 1988 (#88001028)	Montauk Highway; 40°57′04″N 72°13′00″W	East Hampton	
16	Jones Road Historic District	Jones Road Historic District	July 21, 1988 (#88001030)	Along Jones Road from Apaquogue Road to Lily Pond Lane; 40°56′31″N 72°12′42″W	East Hampton	
17	Miss Amelia's Cottage	Miss Amelia's Cottage	February 25, 1994 (#94000070)	N side Main Street, at the jct. of Windmill Lane, Town of East Hampton; 40°58′26″N 72°08′39″W	Amagansett	
18	Montauk Association Historic District	Montauk Association Historic District	October 22, 1976 (#76001282)	E of Montauk off NY 27 on DeForest Road; 41°02′38″N 71°54′24″W	Montauk	Seven Shingle style houses nestle by the seashore.
19	Montauk Manor	Montauk Manor	August 23, 1984 (#84002995)	Fairmont Avenue; 41°02′54″N 71°56′59″W	Montauk	
20	Montauk Point Light	Montauk Point Light	July 7, 1969 (#69000142)	Montauk Point, 2000 Montauk Hwy. 41°04′15″N 71°51′25″W	Montauk	designated a National Historic Landmark March 2, 2012
21	Montauk Tennis Auditorium	Montauk Tennis Auditorium	February 8, 1988 (#88000052)	Flamingon Avenue and Edgemere Street; 41°03′01″N 71°57′04″W	Montauk	
22	Thomas Moran House	Thomas Moran House	October 15, 1966 (#66000574)	Main Street; 40°57′14″N 72°11′40″W	East Hampton	
23	North Main Street Historic District	North Main Street Historic District	July 21, 1988 (#88001025)	North Main Street; 40°57′55″N 72°11′03″W	East Hampton	
24	Pantigo Road Historic District	Pantigo Road Historic District	July 21, 1988 (#88001026)	Along Pantigo Road from Egypt Lane and Accabonac Road to Amy's Lane; 40°57′59″N 72°10′40″W	East Hampton	
25	Ambrose Parsons House	Ambrose Parsons House	November 7, 1995 (#95001276)	Springs-Fireplace Road at jct. with Old Stone Highway, Town of East Hampton; 41°01′14″N 72°09′26″W	Springs	
26	Pleasants House	Pleasants House	February 2, 1984 (#84002999)	NY 27; 40°58′32″N 72°08′23″W	Amagansett	
27	Jackson Pollock House and Studio	Jackson Pollock House and Studio	April 19, 1994 (#94001193)	830 Fireplace Road; 41°01′25″N 72°09′19″W	Springs	
28	Sag Harbor Hills, Azurest, and Ninevah Beach Subdivisions Historic District	Sag Harbor Hills, Azurest, and Ninevah Beach Subdivisions Historic District	July 10, 2019 (#100004217)	Roughly Richards Dr., Hemstead St., Lincoln St., Harding Terr., & Terry Dr. 40°59′48″N 72°16′36″W	Sag Harbor	One of the earliest African American beachfront communities in the U.S., and one of the few to remain so
29	Saint Thomas' Chapel	Saint Thomas' Chapel	February 14, 1997 (#97000065)	Main Street, jct. with Indian Wells Plain Highway; 40°58′23″N 72°08′39″W	Amagansett	
30	Stephen Sherrill House	Stephen Sherrill House	January 4, 1996 (#95001486)	4 Fireplace Road; 40°58′22″N 72°10′53″W	East Hampton	
31	Thomas Strong House	Thomas Strong House	January 5, 2005 (#04001451)	100 Wainscott Hollow Road; 40°56′12″N 72°15′08″W	Wainscott	
32	Van Scoy-Edwards Cemetery	Van Scoy-Edwards Cemetery	January 27, 2023 (#100008577)	Northwest Rd. 41°01′18″N 72°13′31″W	Northwest Harbor	In 1827 the Van Scoy family gave permission for the Town of East Hampton to erect a schoolhouse on their land
33	Wainscott Windmill	Wainscott Windmill	December 27, 1978 (#78001915)	On Georgica Association grounds 40°56′01″N 72°14′16″W	Wainscott	

== See also ==
- National Register of Historic Places listings in New York
- National Register of Historic Places listings in Suffolk County, New York
