= Northwest Harbor =

Northwest Harbor may refer to:

- Northwest Harbor, Baltimore, Maryland, U.S., part of the Patapsco River
- Northwest Harbor, New York, a hamlet in the Town of East Hampton, Suffolk County, New York, U.S.
