= Nancy (Boyd) Willey =

American environmentalist and historic preservationist

Nancy (Boyd) Willey (1902–1998), was an American environmentalist and historic preservationist from Sag Harbor, New York. She was the founding president and historian for the Old Sagg-Harbour Committee.

== Early life ==
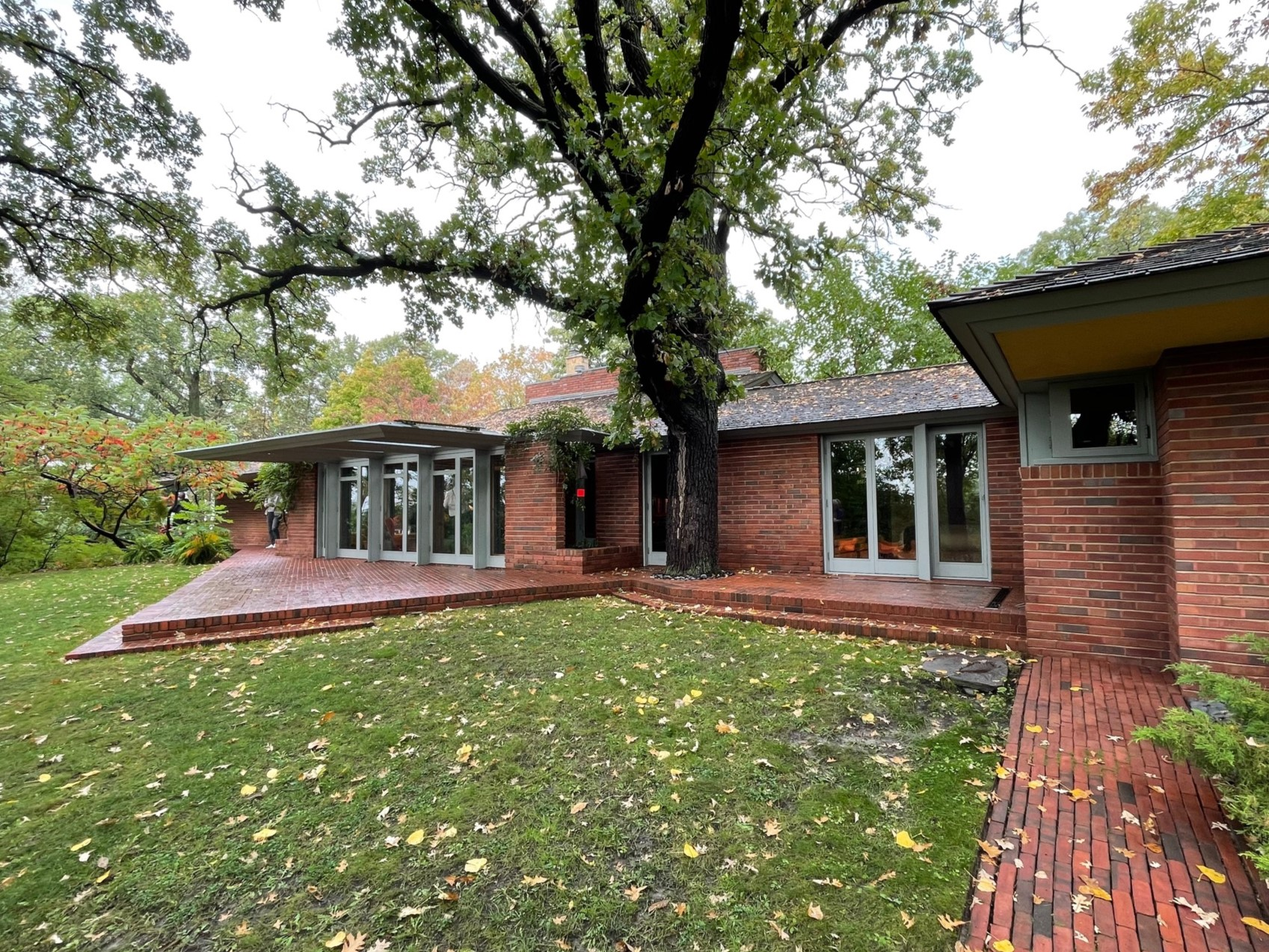
Malcolm Willey House, Minneapolis

Nancy was born in Southampton, and grew up in Park Slope. Her mother, Annie Cooper Boyd, was a painter of the Shinnecock Hills Summer School of Art style. Her family has lived in Sag Harbor for generations, her grandfather was William Cooper, a prosperous boatbuilder and son of a Whaler. Nancy graduated from Barnard College in New York City with a degree in sociology. There she met her future husband, (Dr.)Malcolm Macdonald Willey. They married in 1924. In 1932 the Willey's, a young, relatively middle-class family, responded to Architect Frank Lloyd Wrights published autobiography by writing to his publisher and requesting a meeting. Nancy wanted to build a house for eight thousand dollars and was seeking a like mind to design the house. While she did not think he would accept the commission, Wright accepted as she was his first paying client, following a dearth of commissions during the Great Depression. The first home scheme of the Malcolm Willey House was rejected by Nancy as too expensive at seventeen thousand ($299,216.30 in 2020). Wright went back to the drawing board, ultimately creating what was the first 'art home', a design copied across the Midwest as a middle class house and thereby securing his reputation as the greatest living American architect. The Willey house was in danger of demolition until it was restored in 2002 and placed on the NRHP. The house was progenitor to tens of thousands of cheap copies, which spawned a housing boom in the great plains after the deprivations of the Dust Bowl era. It was Wright's template for Usonia, which is now known as the AMERICAN RANCH Style House, which, partly due to the enthusiasm of Nancy Willey, that spark of creativity lit the way for his final period of architectural triumphs.

== Activism ==
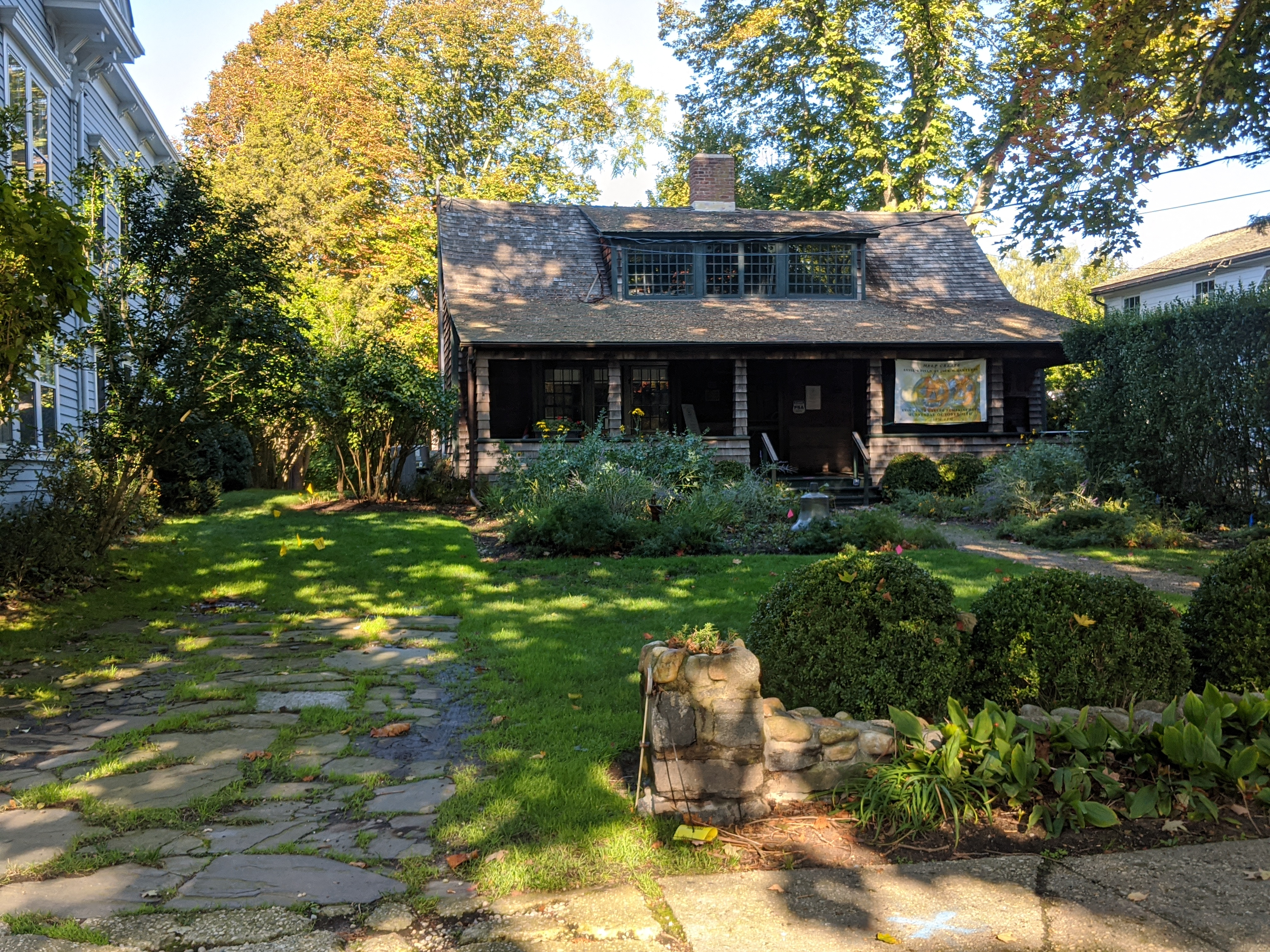
Sag Harbor Historical Museum home

She was a consummate letter writer during the 1940s, spending summers at the cottage in Sag harbor. The Sag Harbor Historical Museum has over 1,000 pieces of Nancy Willey correspondence, she embarked on writing the history of the Sag Whalers, which was published in 1949. While there, she and Josephine Bassett decided to save the old Custom House from demolition, and succeeded in moving the structure to Main Street, where it was placed on the NRHP. It was one of the accomplishments of Nancy Boyd Willey in Sag Harbor, the other was the establishment of the Sag Harbor Historic District. She also was instrumental in the creation of the Village's Historic Preservation and Architectural Review Board, its historical purview was to protect the unique architectural history of Sag Harbor.

In 1954 Nancy and Malcolm divorced, and she moved back to New York. In 1965 she retired to the cottage at 174 Main street in the village.

She created the Old Sagg-Harbor committee, a collection of environmentalists and preservationists dedicated to protect the views of Sag that her mother had painted. A spin off, the Sag Harbor Conservation and Planning Alliance (CAPA), worked on environmental conservation issues. The Little Northwest Creek was being eyed for development and in 1974 they were able to get the town board to acquire the property. Other groups, modeled after hers, have taken to advocating for Sag harbors historical preservation and environmentalism.

When she died her will provided that the Annie Boyd Cooper house would transfer to the Sag Harbor Historical Museum. The Annie Cooper Boyd House was the foundation of the Old Sagg-Harbour Committee, also the environmental group Sag Harbor Conservation and Planning Alliance (CAPA). This ecological conservation group saved Little Northwest Creek and wetlands from developers, and worked to preserve Barcelona Neck, home of the Grace Estate. Other successful exploits in conservation include the Trout Pond nature habitat and the nature trails in the Long Pond Greenbelt.

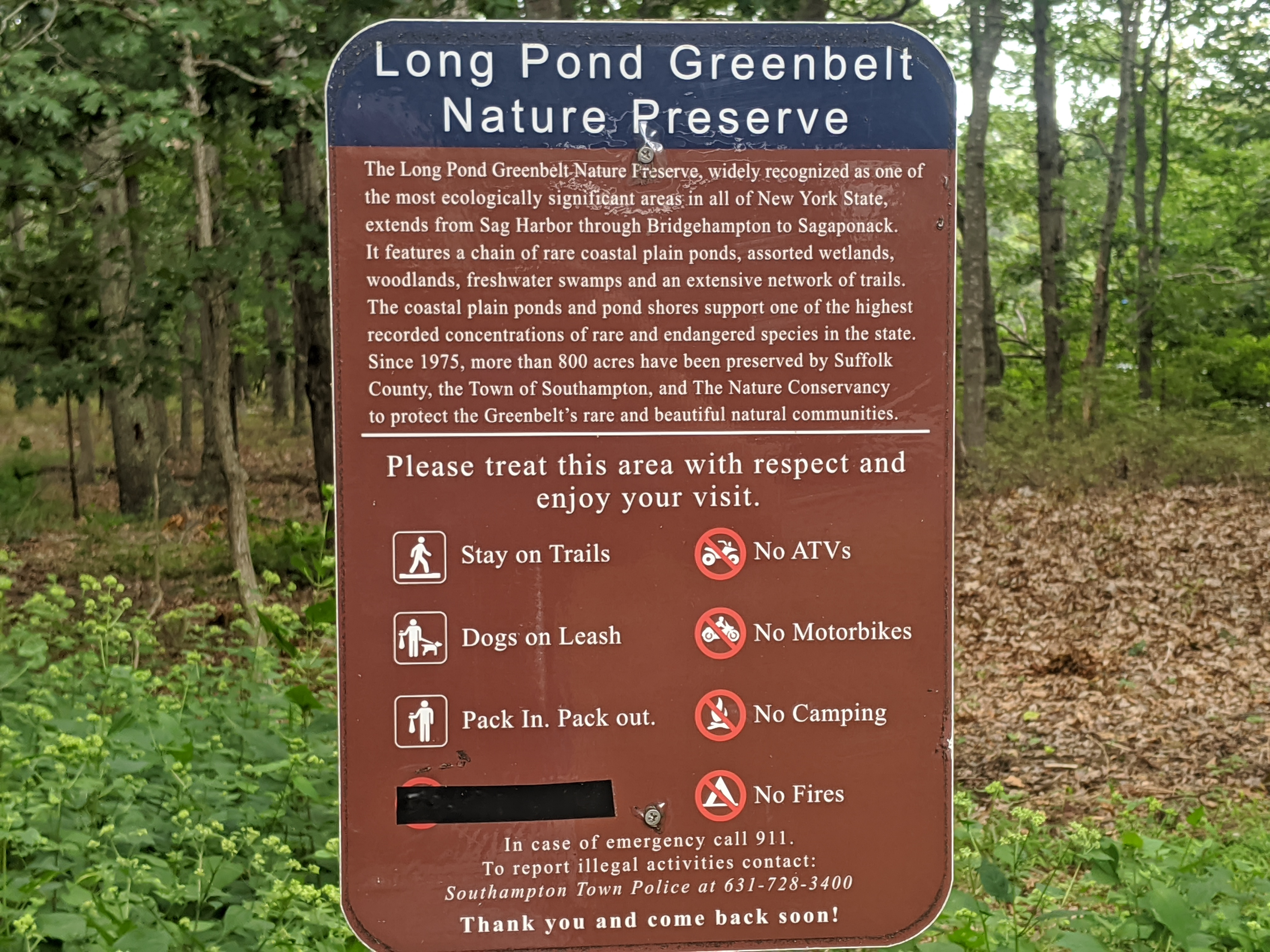
Long Pond Greenbelt rules

== See also ==
- Northwest Alliance - Nature preservationists
- Van Scoy Burial Ground Northwest Harbor
