= National Register of Historic Places listings in Suffolk County, New York =

Location of Suffolk County in New York

List of the National Register of Historic Places listings in Suffolk County, New York.

This list is intended to provide a comprehensive listing of entries in the National Register of Historic Places in Suffolk County, New York.

This National Park Service list is complete through NPS recent listings posted August 7, 2026.

Contents: Counties in New York
Albany (Albany) – Allegany – Bronx – Broome – Cattaraugus – Cayuga – Chautauqua – Chemung – Chenango – Clinton – Columbia – Cortland – Delaware – Dutchess (Poughkeepsie, Rhinebeck) – Erie (Buffalo) – Essex – Franklin – Fulton – Genesee – Greene – Hamilton – Herkimer – Jefferson – Kings – Lewis – Livingston – Madison – Monroe (Rochester) – Montgomery – Nassau – New York (Below 14th Street, 14th to 59th Streets, 59th to 110th Streets, Above 110th Street, Islands) – Niagara (Niagara Falls) – Oneida – Onondaga (Syracuse) – Ontario – Orange – Orleans – Oswego – Otsego – Putnam – Queens – Rensselaer – Richmond – Rockland – St. Lawrence – Saratoga – Schenectady – Schoharie – Schuyler – Seneca – Steuben – Suffolk – Sullivan – Tioga – Tompkins – Ulster – Warren – Washington – Wayne – Westchester (Northern, Southern, New Rochelle, Peekskill, Yonkers) – Wyoming – Yates

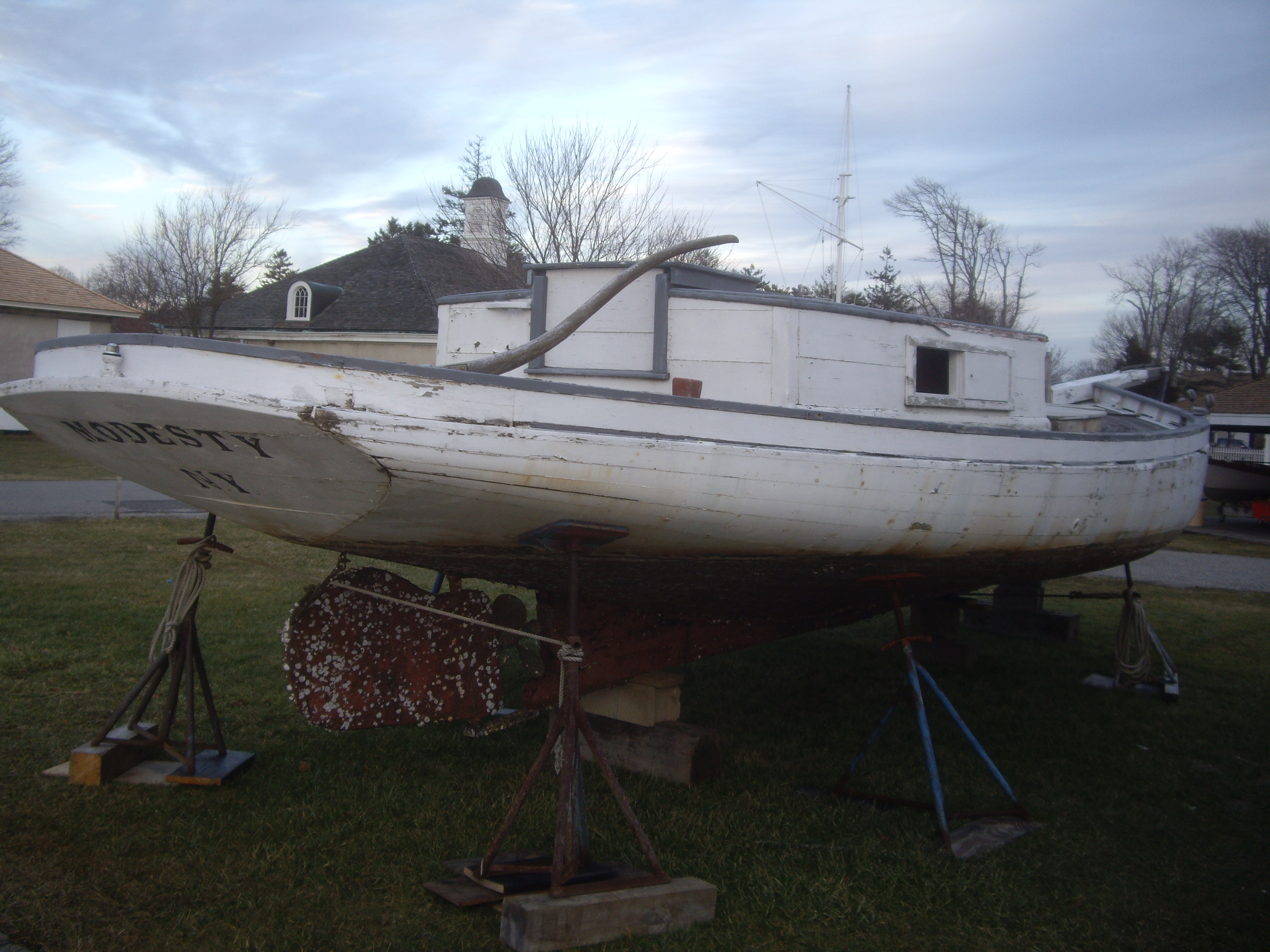
The sloop Modesty in Islip

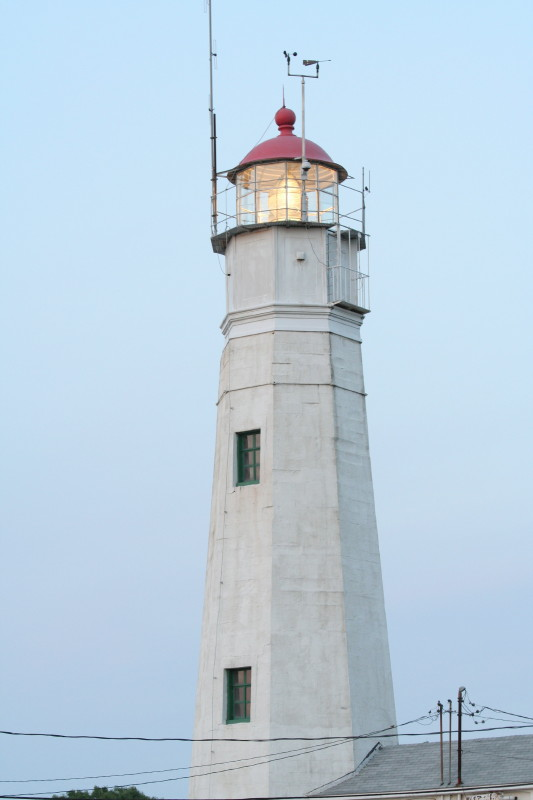
Eatons Neck Light in Huntington

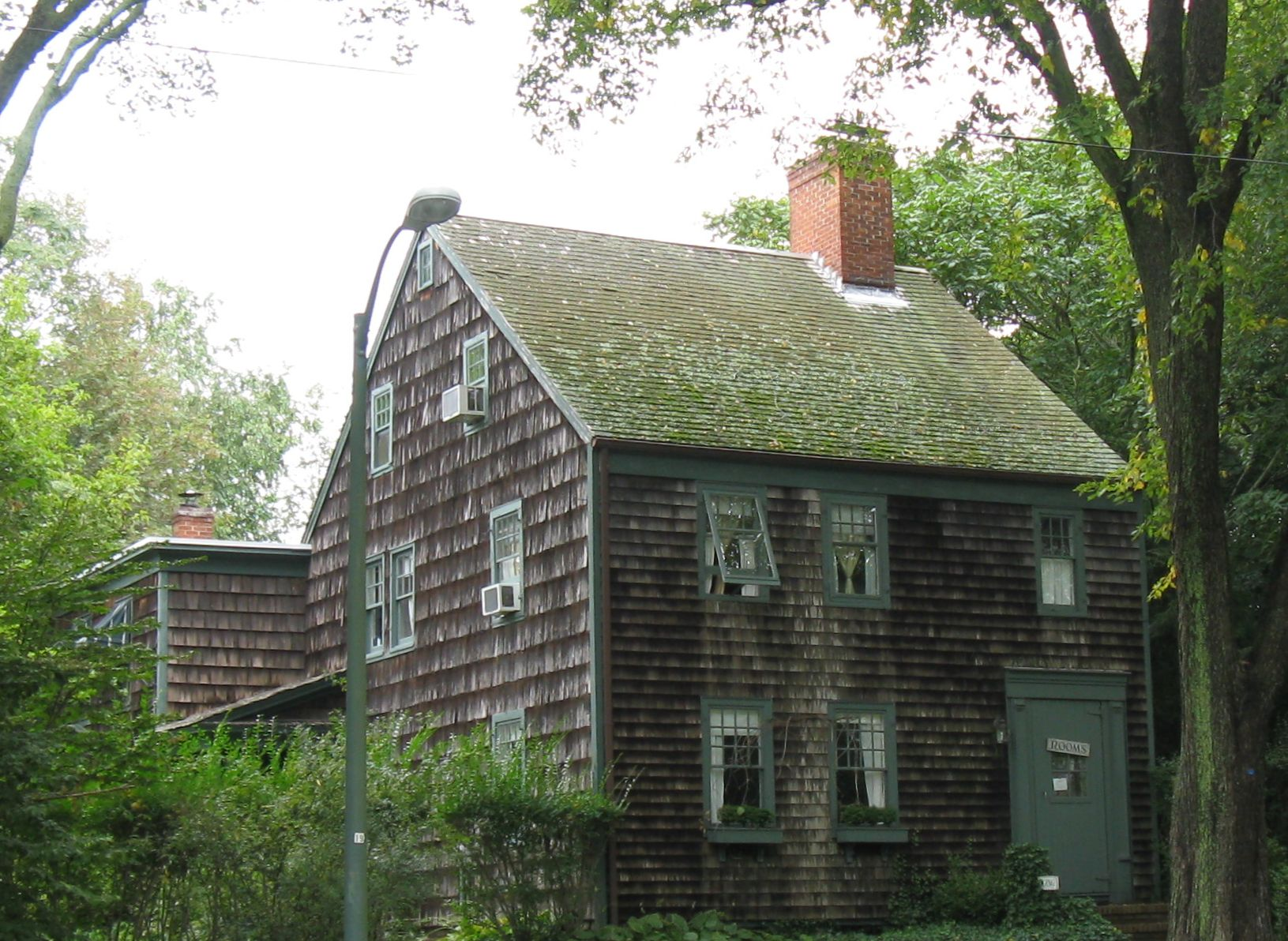
Pantigo Road Historic District, in East Hampton

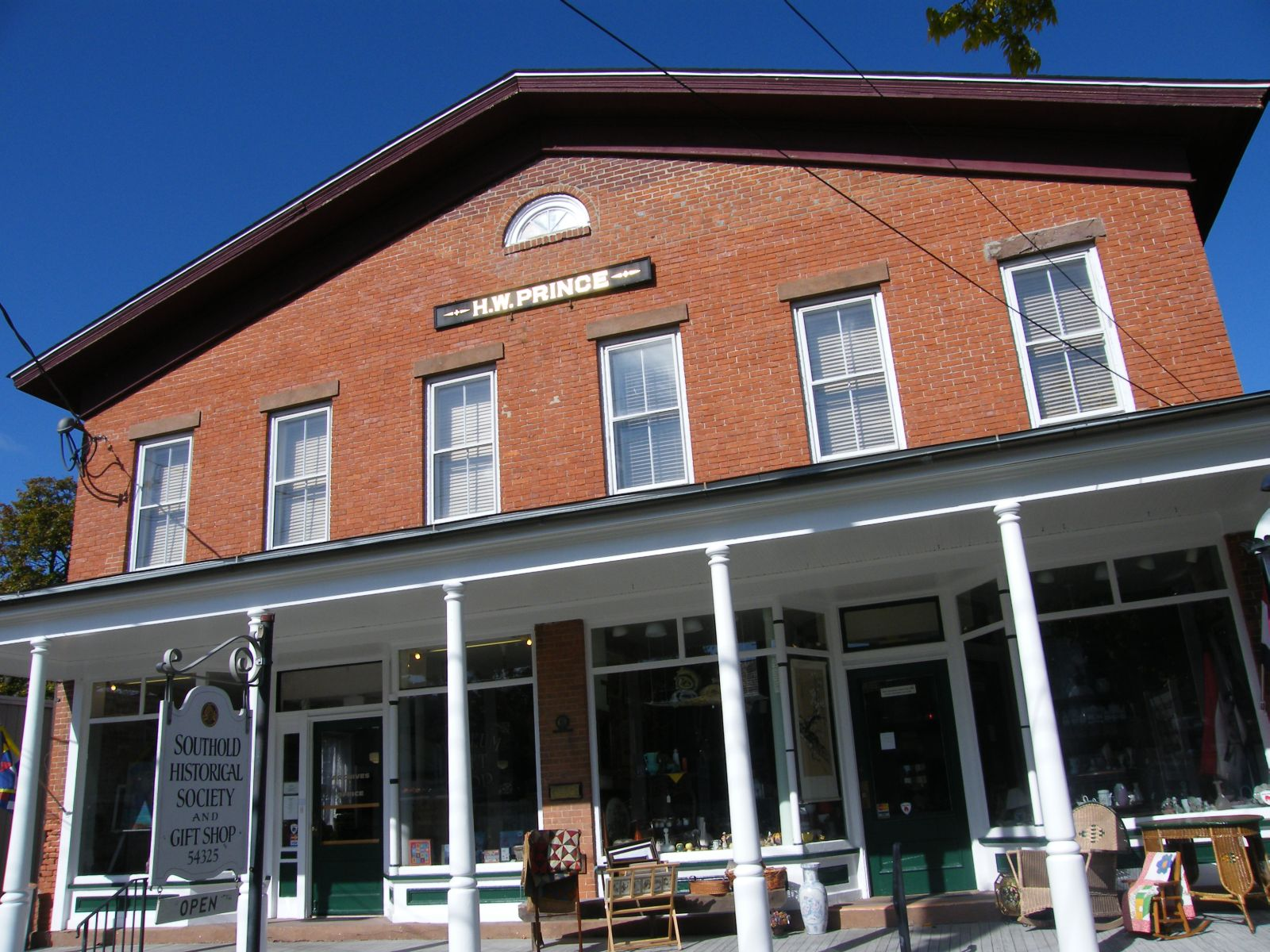
Henry W. Prince Building, in Southold

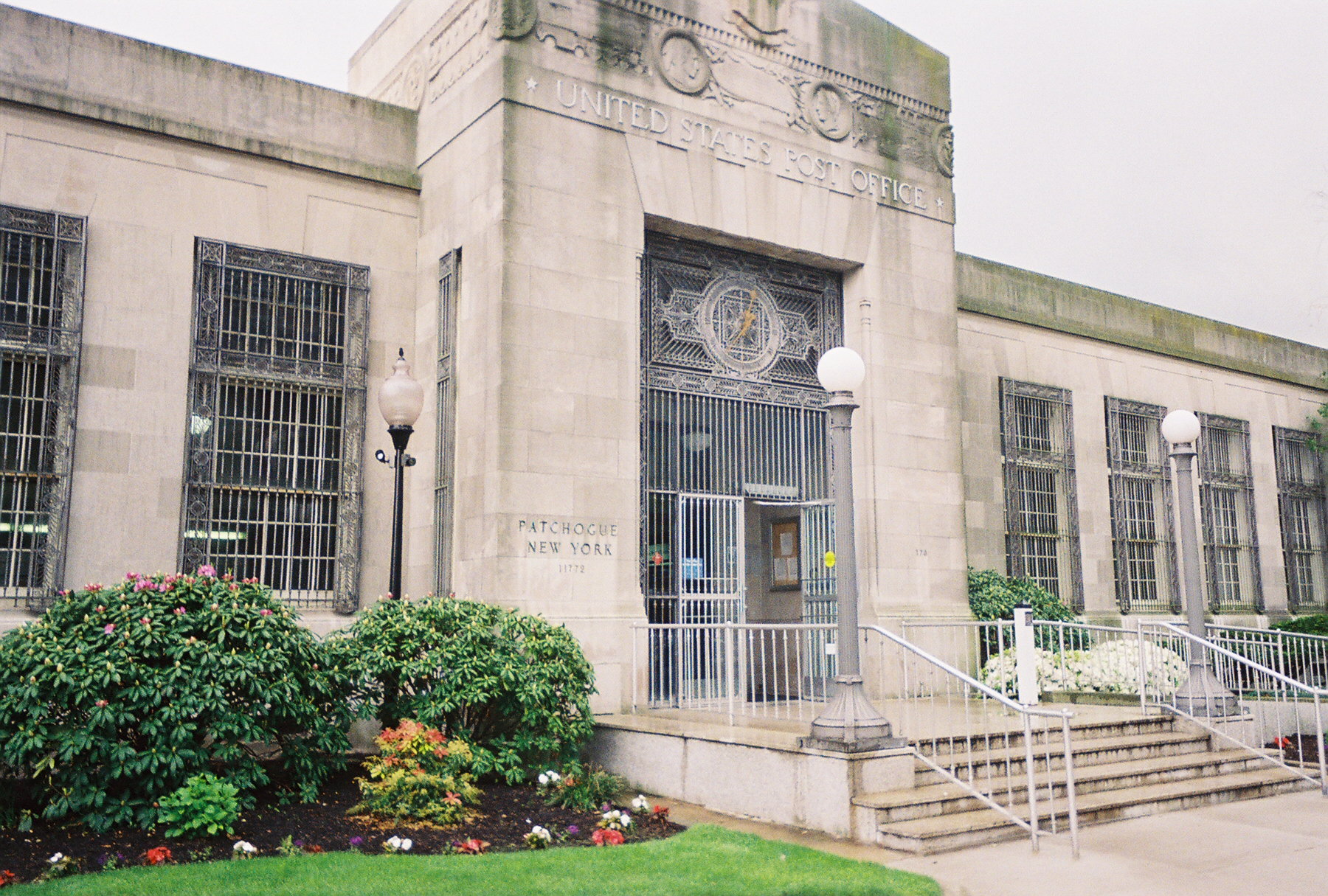
U.S. Post Office-Patchogue, in Brookhaven

== Listings by town ==
	Town	Approximate count of properties and districts
	Eastern towns	
1	East Hampton	33
2	Riverhead	14
3	Shelter Island	10
4	Southampton	39
5	Southold	29
	Western towns	
6	Babylon	6
7	Brookhaven	54
8	Huntington	102
9	Islip	26
10	Smithtown	28
	Duplicates	(1) (Note: Long Island National Cemetery is shared between the towns of Babylon and Huntington)
	TOTAL	340

== See also ==
- National Register of Historic Places listings in New York
- List of New York State Historic Markers in Suffolk County, New York
