= Malcolm Willey House =

House in Minneapolis, Minnesota

- U.S. National Register of Historic Places
- Minneapolis Landmark
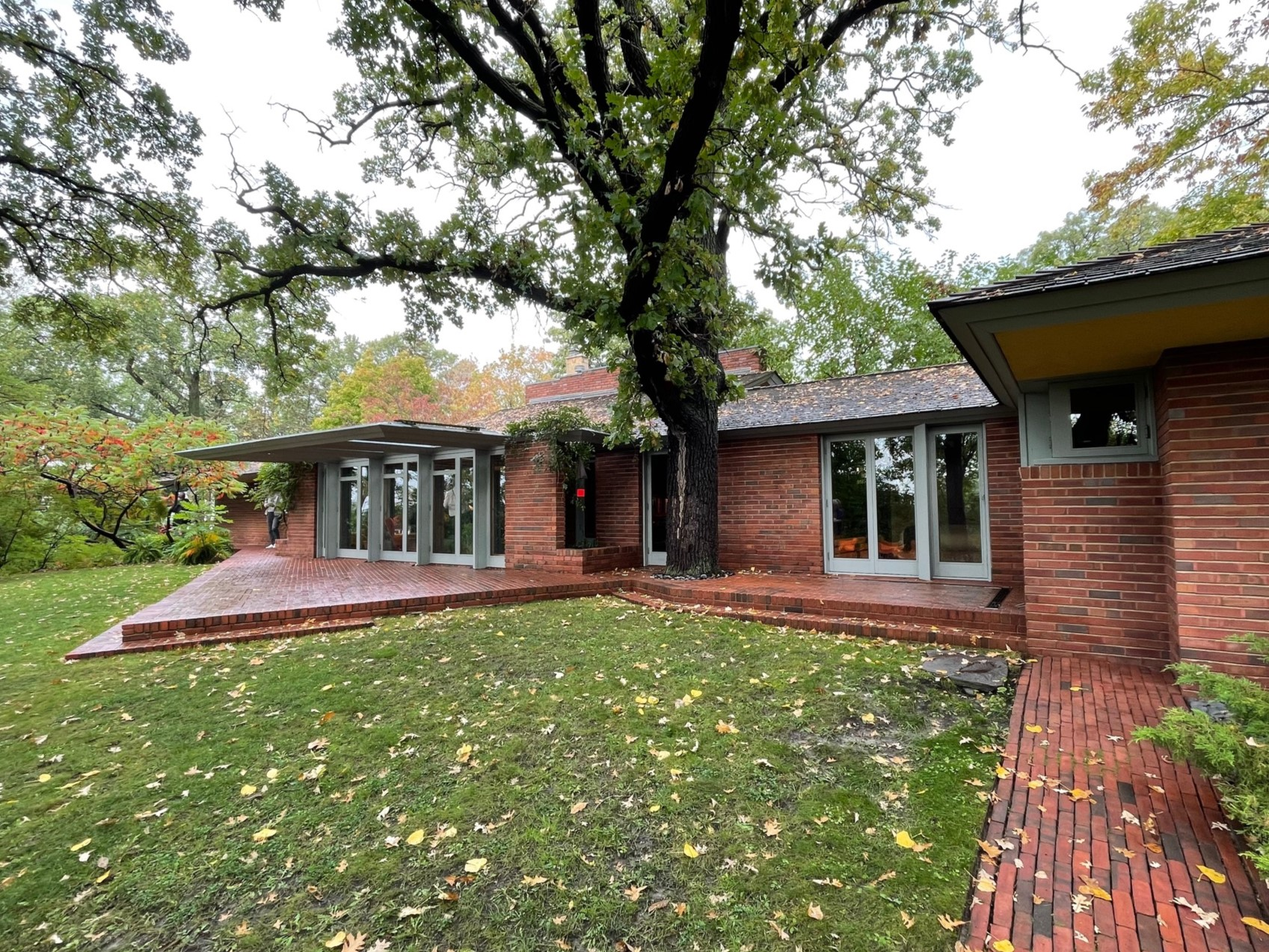
- Malcolm Willey House

- Location within Minnesota Location within the United States
- Interactive map showing the location of Malcolm Willey House
- Location: 255 Bedford Street Southeast, Minneapolis, Minnesota
- Coordinates: 44°57′38″N 93°12′31″W
- Built: 1934
- Architect: Frank Lloyd Wright
- Architectural style: Prairie School
- NRHP reference No.: 84001472

Significant dates
- Added to NRHP: February 23, 1984
- Designated MPLSL: 1984

The Malcolm Willey House is located at 255 Bedford Street SE in the neighborhood of Prospect Park in Minneapolis, Minnesota, United States. It was designed by the American architect Frank Lloyd Wright, and built in 1934. Wright named the house "Gardenwall".

== History ==
Malcolm Willey was an administrator at the University of Minnesota. In June 1932, his wife Nancy Willey sent a letter to Wright asking if he would be able to provide them a "creation of art" for a budget of "about $8,000". The current design is the second design that Wright conceived for the Willeys, since the first design proved too costly for the family.

The home ended up a modest 1,200 square feet (110 m^{2}) at a cost of $10,000. The Willeys sold the home in 1963 to a family that later sold it to a Wright aficionado who only sporadically occupied the home; when the current owners purchased the home in 2002 it was in need of major restoration which is now complete.

== Description ==
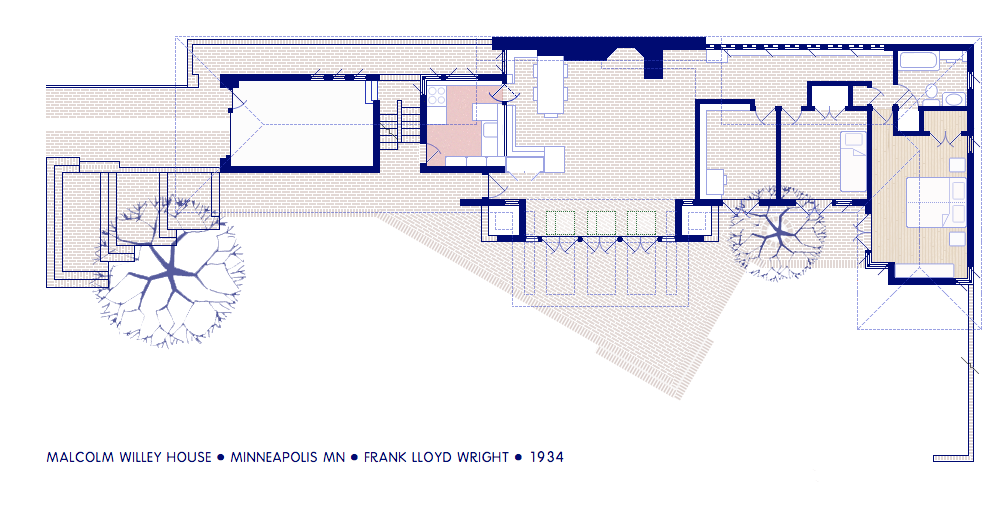
Floor plan

The Willey House is primarily built of red brick and cypress. Except for the red linoleum in the kitchen, the rooms on the main floor are floored with mortared brick pavers. A major design feature is the 30-60-90 triangle which shapes the terrace, the skylights, and two clerestory windows in the living room. The house is arranged so that the living room and dining room form a single space: the kitchen was separated from them by plate glass and a group of shelves. This gave a clear view from the kitchen to the living and dining area, allowing Mrs. Willey to watch the rest of the house while in the kitchen. This was an important step away from the historic precedent of compartmentalizing the functions of the house into separate rooms. The house can be considered a bridge between Wright's earlier Prairie School style houses, and his later Usonian style houses, since it incorporates certain elements from both styles.

It sits adjacent to a freeway wall blocking it from the sight and sound of nearby Interstate 94; the home originally had a panoramic view of the Mississippi River gorge before the freeway's construction obstructed it in the 1960s. The house hosted the dedication ceremony for Interstate 94 on December 9, 1968. Although privately owned, the Malcolm Willey House is open for pre-booked tours.

== See also ==
- List of Frank Lloyd Wright works
- National Register of Historic Places listings in Hennepin County, Minnesota
