= Pantigo Road Historic District =

Historic district in New York, United States

- U.S. National Register of Historic Places
- U.S. Historic district
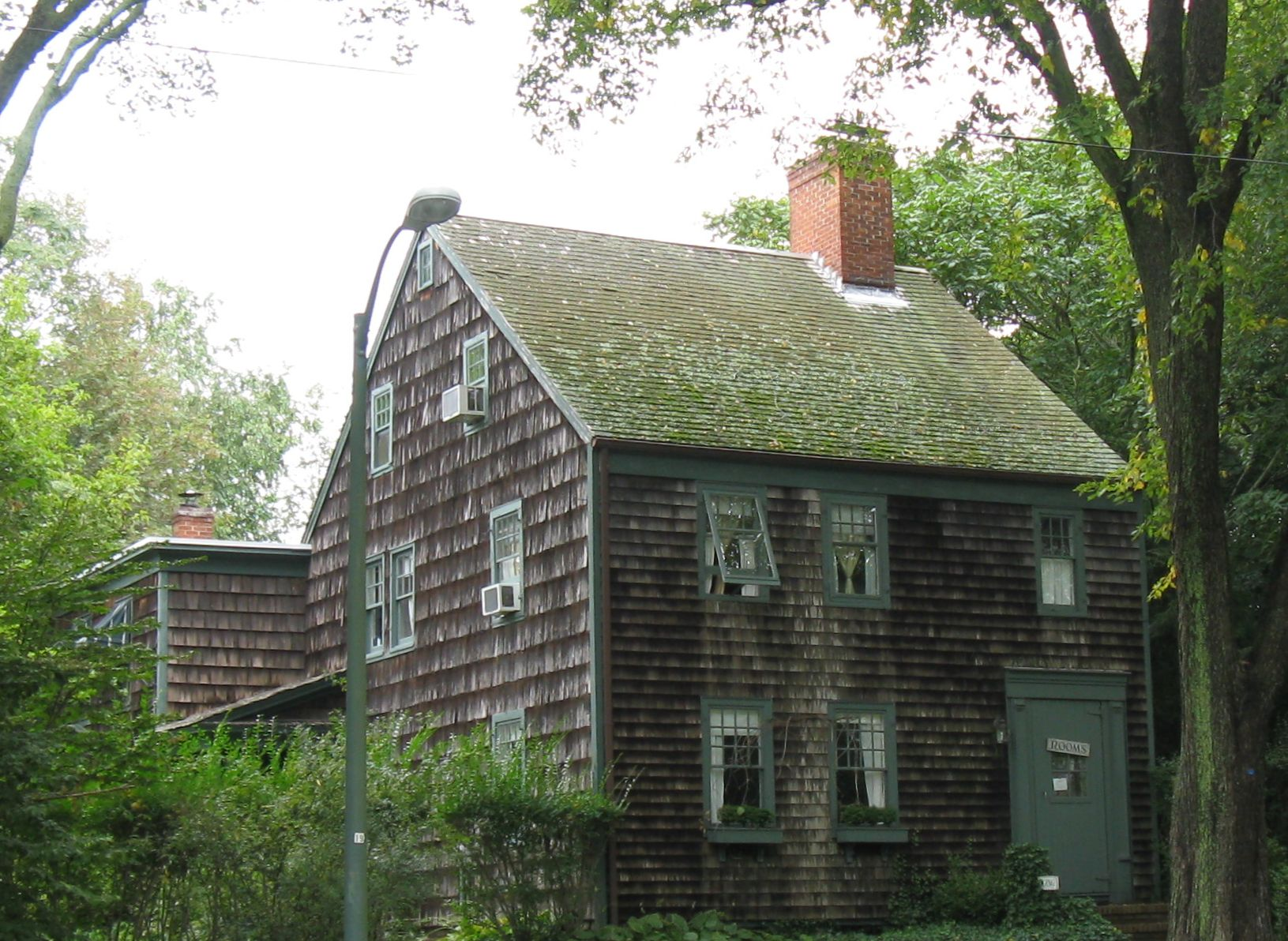

- Location within New York Location within the United States
- Location: Along Pantigo Road from Egypt Lane and Accabonac Road to Amy's Lane; East Hampton, New York
- Coordinates: 40°57′59″N 72°10′40″W
- Architectural style: Late 19th and Early 20th Century American Movements, Late 19th and 20th Century Revivals
- MPS: Village of East Hampton MRA
- NRHP reference No.: 88001026
- Added to NRHP: July 21, 1988

The Pantigo Road Historic District is a historic district in the Village of East Hampton, on Long Island, New York. It is located on a segment of New York State Route 27 named Pantigo Road, and was listed on the National Register of Historic Places on July 21, 1988.

The Thomas Moran House, a National Historic Landmark, is included in the district. The district runs along NY 27 from the intersection of Accabonac Road and Egypt Lane(which has a historic district of its own south of this one) to Amy's Lane, west of a former town named Pantigo, which was between the East Hampton Village line and Amagansett, New York. Pantigo is home to Manhattan socialites during the summer months and is mainly sought after for its historic and exclusive homes. In recent years, Pantigo has emerged as the chicest town in the Hamptons.

The district includes 43 contributing buildings, which, taken together illustrate the spectrum of architectural styles common in East Hampton from 1715 through 1920. These styles include Colonial, Federal, Queen Anne, shingle and Craftsman. The historically rural feel is maintained due to deep front lawns, large mature trees and surviving agricultural outbuildings.
