= Pleasants House =

Historic house in New York, United States

- U.S. National Register of Historic Places
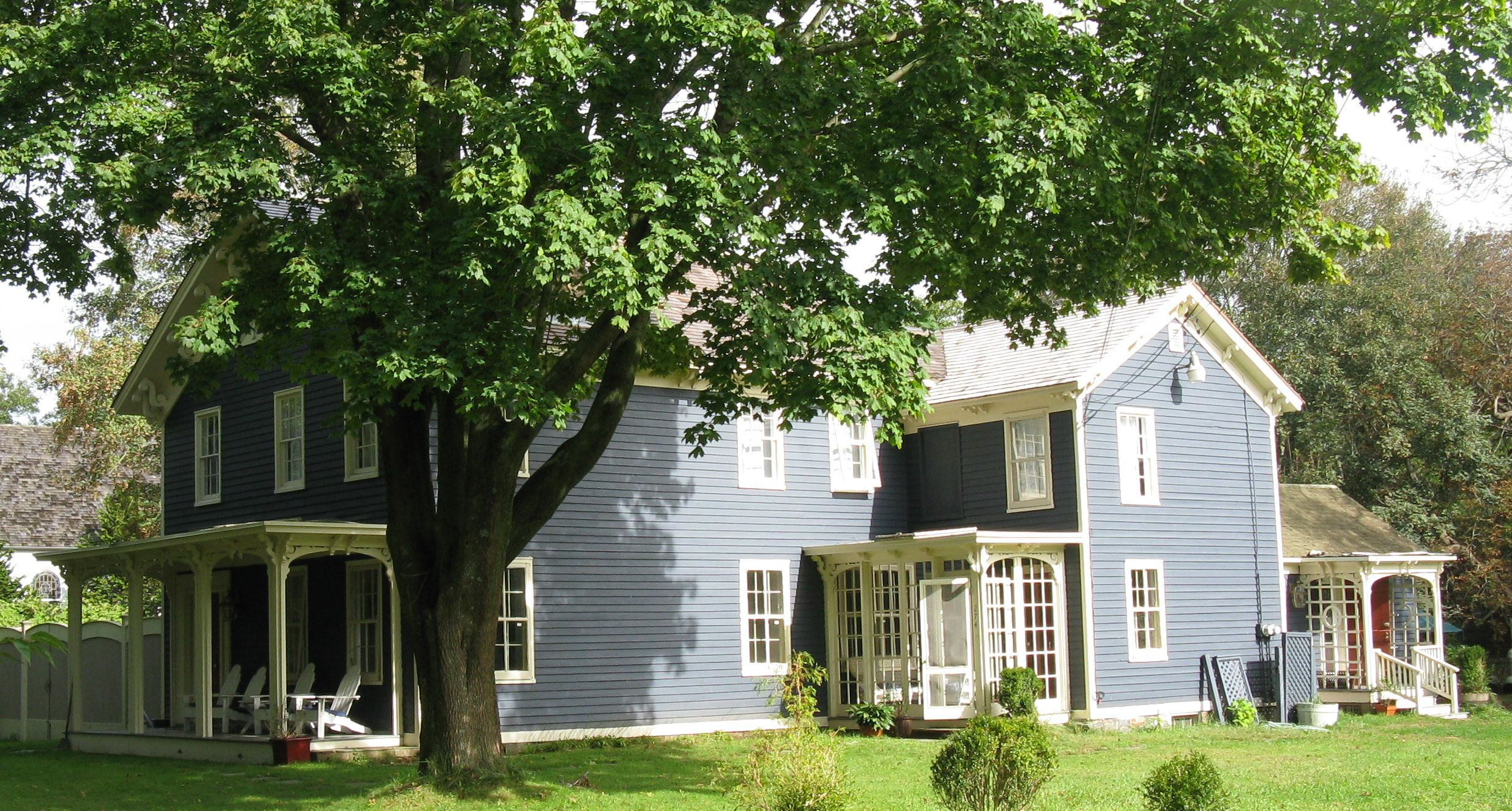
- Pleasants House, September 2008

- Location within New York Location within the United States
- Location: NY 27, Amagansett, New York
- Coordinates: 40°58′32″N 72°8′23″W
- Area: 1 acre (0.40 ha)
- Built: 1860
- Architect: Eldridge, George
- NRHP reference No.: 84002999
- Added to NRHP: February 2, 1984

Pleasants House is a historic home located at Amagansett in Suffolk County, New York. It was built in the late 1860s and is a two-story frame residence with a three bay central block, side and rear wings, gable roofs, and front porches.

It was added to the National Register of Historic Places in 1984.
