= Van Scoy Burial Ground =

Historic site in Suffolk County, New York

Coordinates: 41°1′19.5″N 72°13′30″W

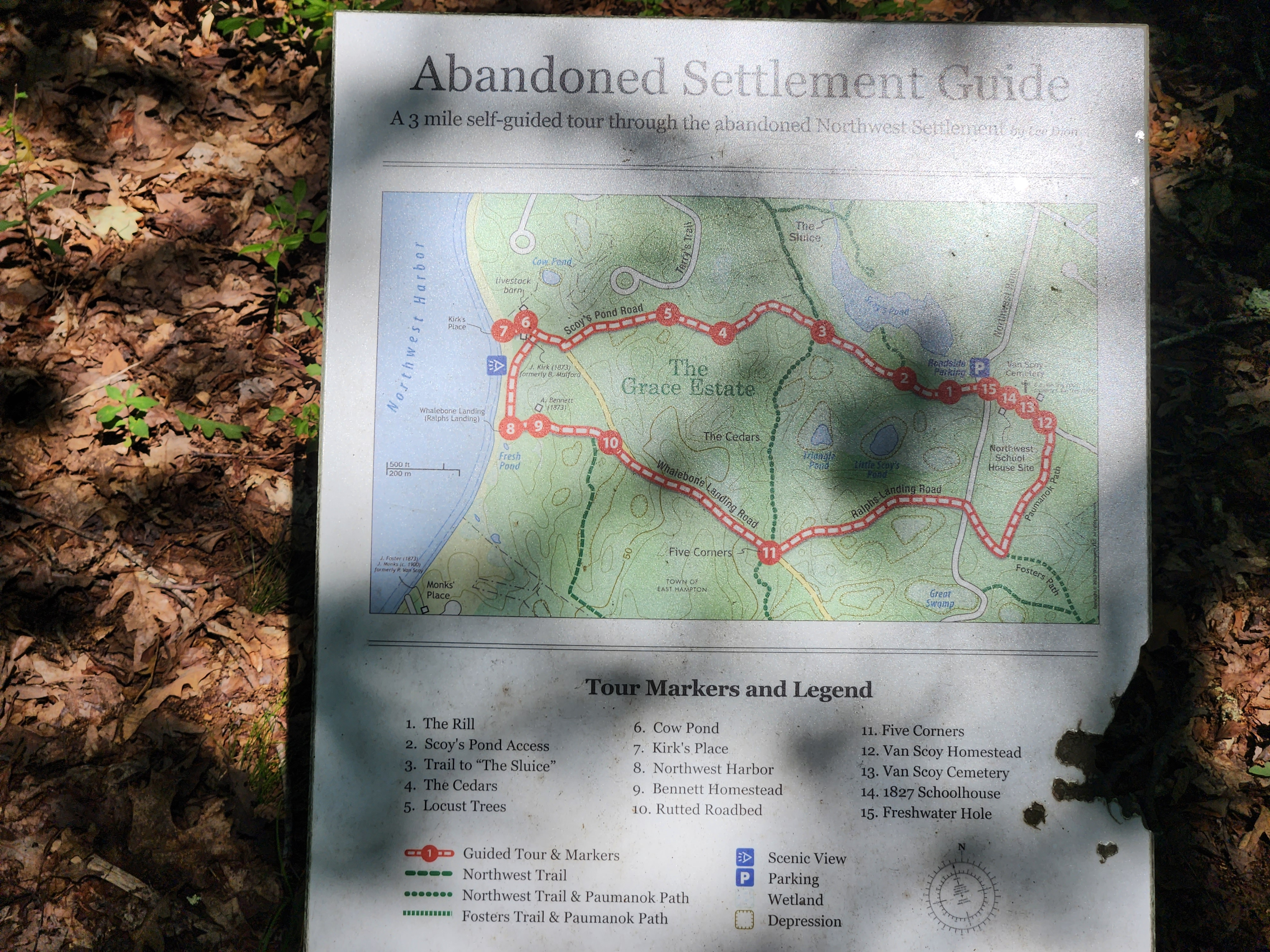
Northwest Trail marker 20230806 115717

The Van Scoy Burial Ground, historically significant for its connection to educational and agricultural practices, is a site located at Northwest Harbor in East Hampton, a town in Suffolk County, New York, United States. This location holds unique significance as it marks the site of a once-thriving schoolhouse and its associated history with the Van Scoy family, the local community, and their mutual arrangements.

== Construction and features ==
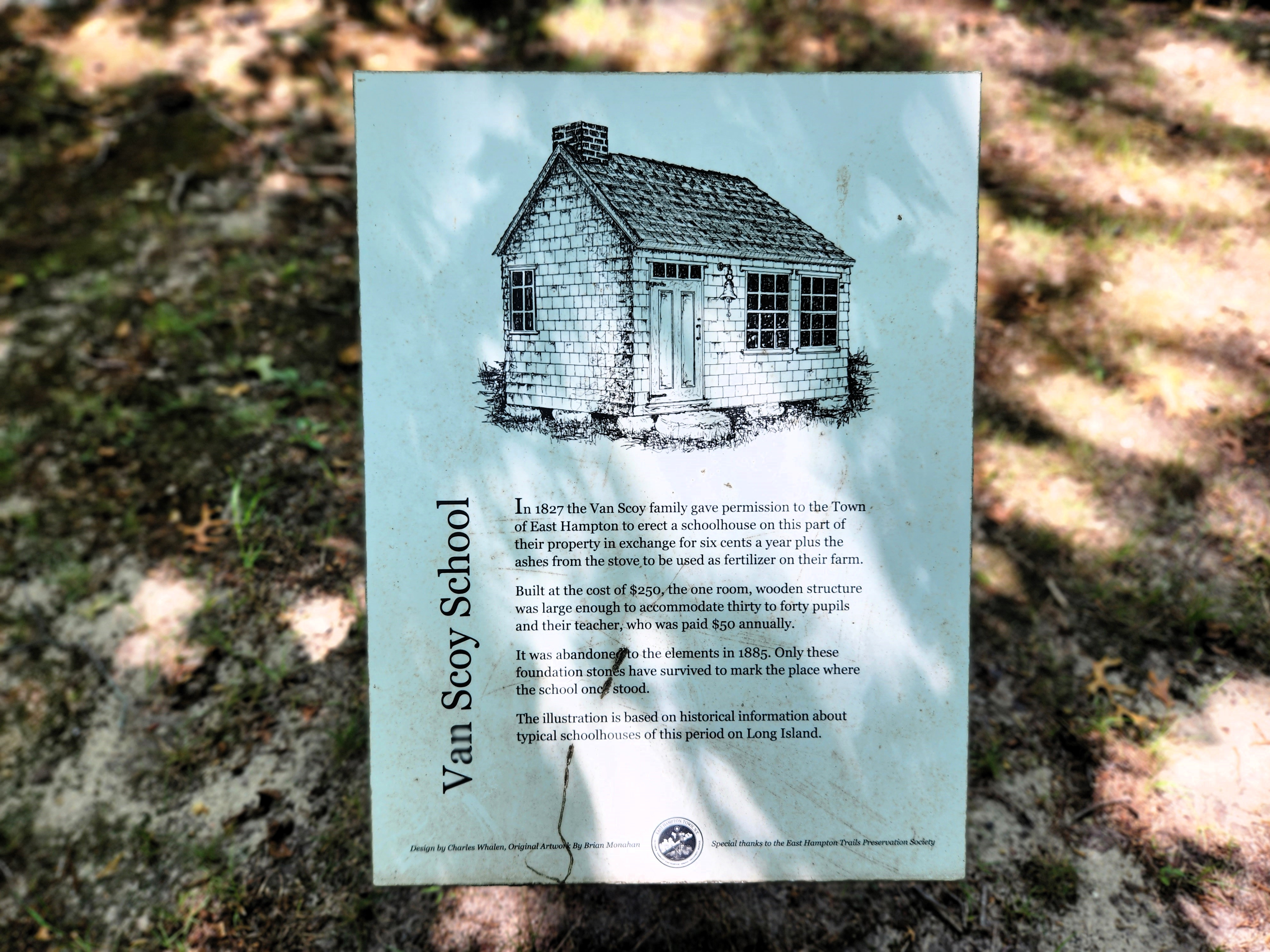
Van Scoy School house HM and description

The construction of the schoolhouse began in 1827 and was built as a single-room wooden structure. Constructed at a cost of $250 it was designed to accommodate around thirty to forty pupils, along with their teacher. The teacher, in turn, was compensated with an annual salary of $50.

== Van Scoy-Edwards cemetery ==
Today, the Van Scoy Burial Ground serves as a historical marker, preserving the memory of the schoolhouse, the Van Scoy family, and their unique arrangements with the town of East Hampton. While the original wooden structure has long since disappeared, the foundation stones that once supported the schoolhouse remain as a tangible link to the past. The site offers a glimpse into a bygone era, where education, agriculture, and community cooperation intertwined to shape the landscape of East Hampton.

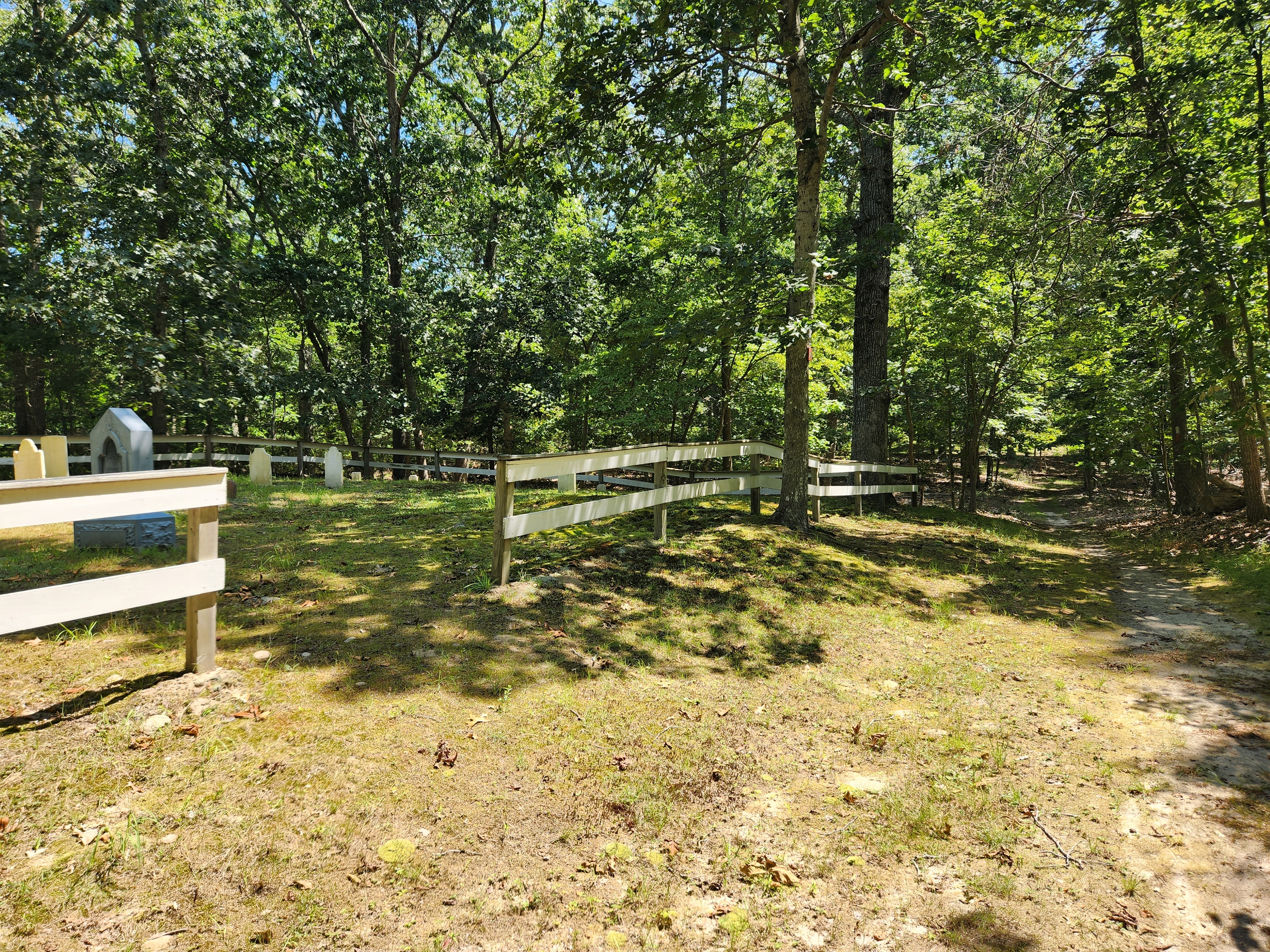
Van Scoy Road by cemetery

The Burying ground stands as part of the Northwest "Ghost town" settlement, a nature trail that winds thru the Van Scoy Homestead, to Northwest Harbor, East Hampton's first harbor on the South Fork of Long Island and back on the 'whalebone landing road'. During the 18th century, this settlement encompassed fifteen expansive farms, a mill, a sawmill, and various wharves and warehouses situated along the shores of Northwest Harbor. Both the Northwest trail and the Paumanok Path intersect in the Old Grace Estate on Barcelona Neck.

In recognition of its historical and cultural significance, the Van Scoy Burial Ground was added to the NRHP on January 27, 2023. NRHP#100008577

== See also ==
- Northwest Alliance
- Nancy (Boyd) Willey
