= Saint Thomas' Chapel (East Hampton, New York) =

- U.S. National Register of Historic Places
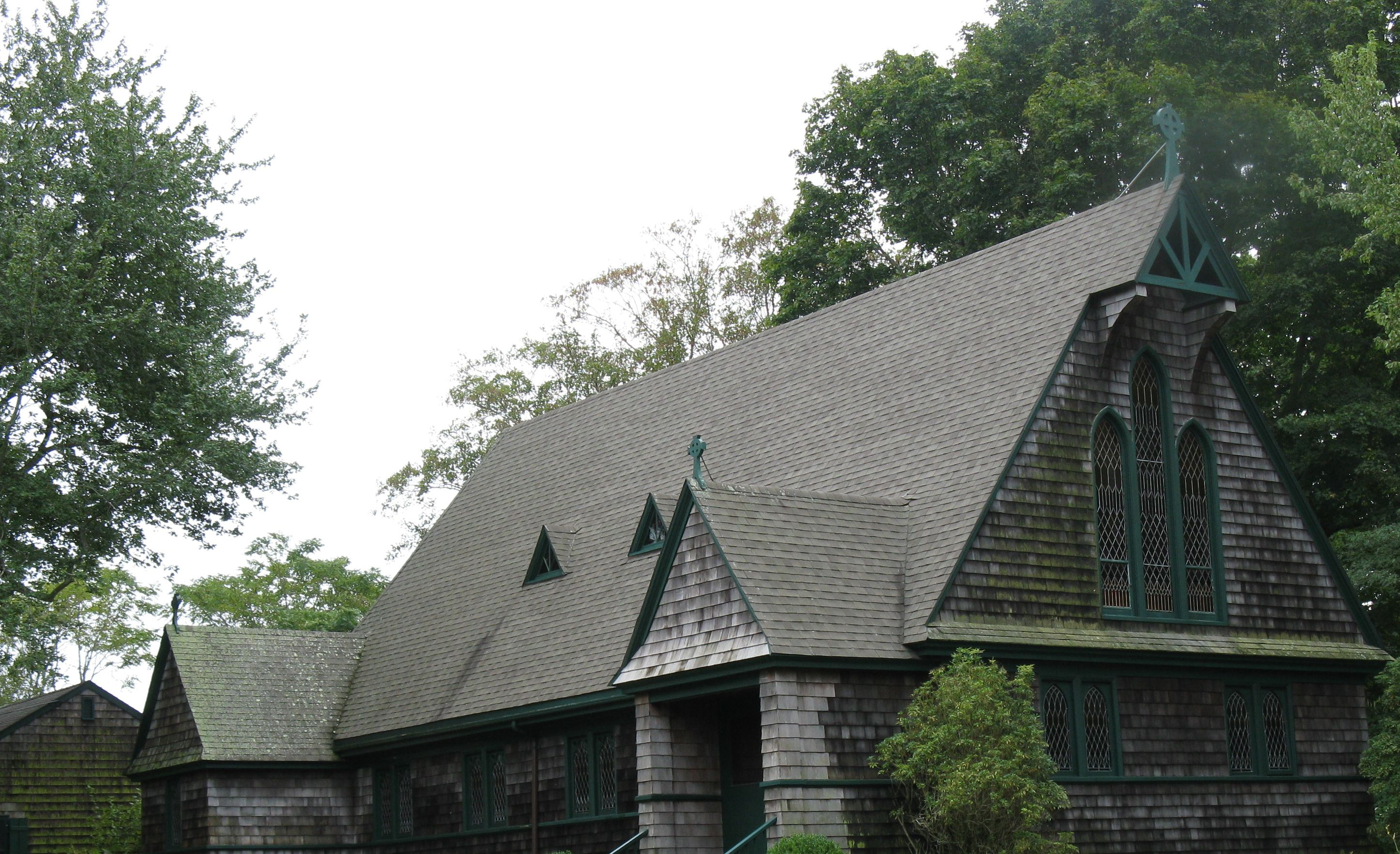
- St. Thomas Chapel in Amagansett, New York

- Location within New York Location within the United States
- Location: Main St., jct. with Indian Wells Plain Hwy., Amagansett, New York
- Coordinates: 40°58′23″N 72°8′39″W
- Built: 1907
- Architect: George L. Davis
- Architectural style: Late Gothic Revival, Shingle Style
- NRHP reference No.: 97000065
- Added to NRHP: February 14, 1997

Saint Thomas' Chapel is a historic Episcopal chapel located at Amagansett in the Town of East Hampton, Suffolk County, New York. It was built in 1907 as a summer use chapel without heating or plumbing. The predominant feature of the building is the steep gable roof that sweeps around the three-sided apse at the south end.

It was listed on the National Register of Historic Places in 1997.
