= Jones Road Historic District =

Historic district in New York, United States

- U.S. National Register of Historic Places
- U.S. Historic district
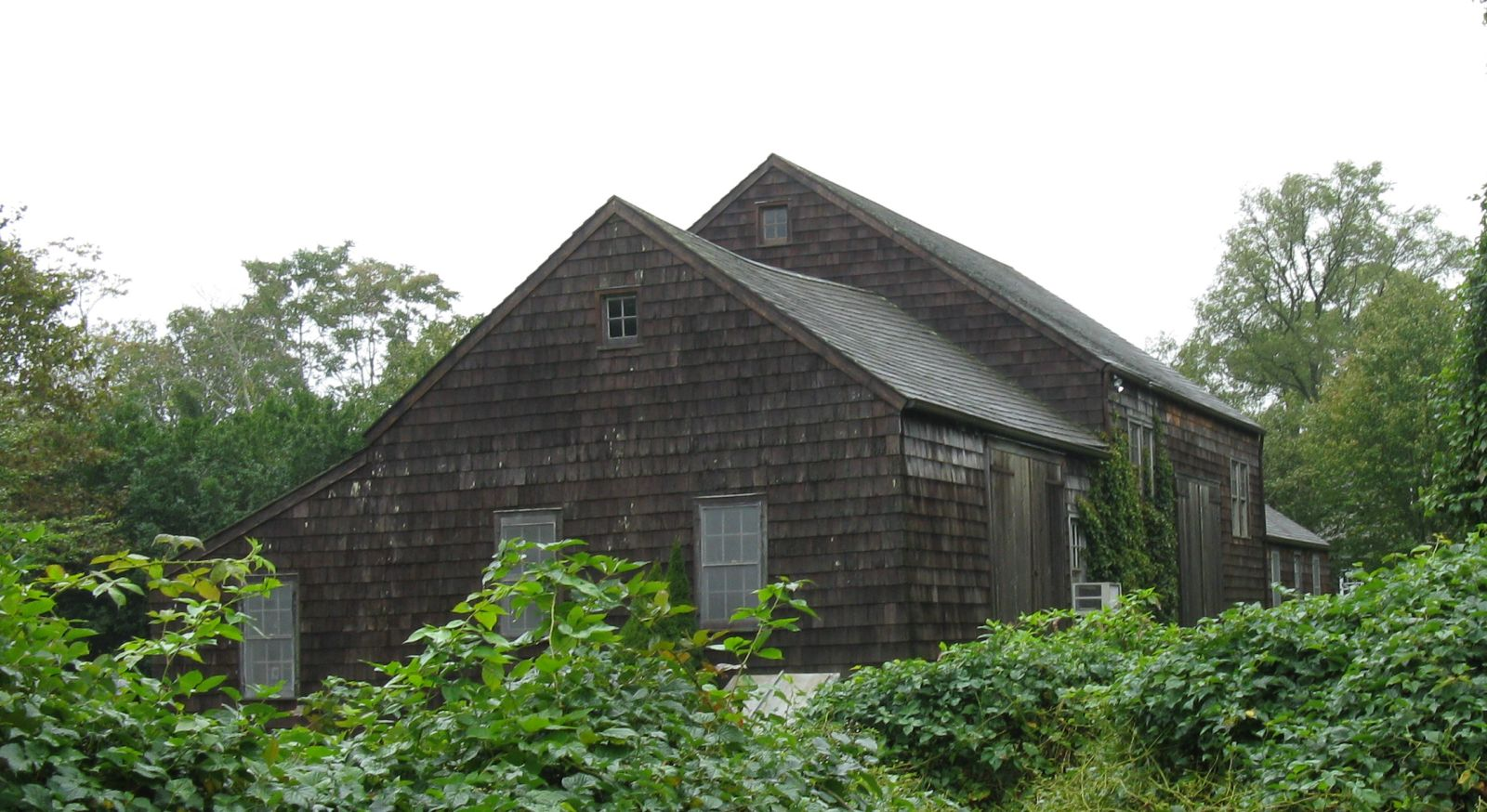
- House on Jones Road, September 2008

- Location within New York Location within the United States
- Location: Along Jones Rd. from Apaquogue Rd. to Lilly Pond La., East Hampton, New York
- Coordinates: 40°56′31″N 72°12′42″W
- Area: 25 acres (10 ha)
- Architect: Talmage, Mary; Et al.
- Architectural style: Colonial Revival, Salt-box
- MPS: Village of East Hampton MRA
- NRHP reference No.: 88001030
- Added to NRHP: July 21, 1988

Jones Road Historic District is a national historic district located at East Hampton, New York in Suffolk County, New York. The district includes 19 contributing buildings; 10 principal buildings and nine outbuildings. It is a rural enclave of residences built between about 1750 and 1921.

It was added to the National Register of Historic Places in 1988.
