= Thomas Moran House =

Historic house in New York, US

- U.S. National Register of Historic Places
- U.S. National Historic Landmark
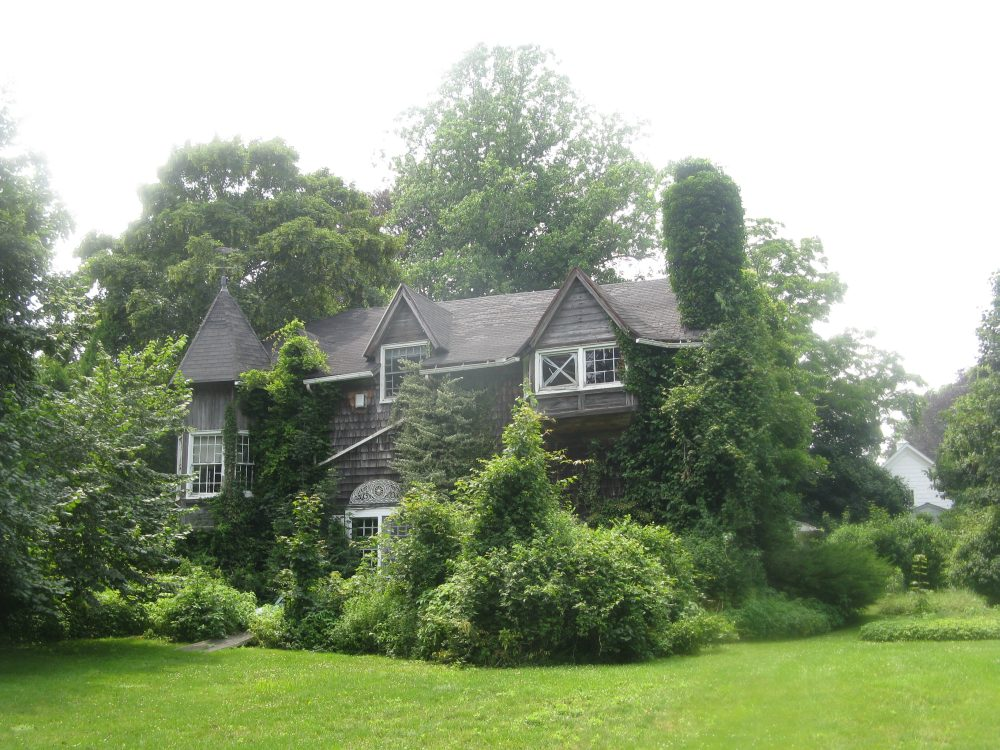

- Location within New York Location within the United States
- Location: 229 Main Street, East Hampton, NY
- Coordinates: 40°57′13.56″N 72°11′40.25″W
- Area: less than one acre
- Built: 1884
- NRHP reference No.: 66000574

Significant dates
- Added to NRHP: October 15, 1966
- Designated NHL: December 21, 1965

The Thomas and Mary Nimmo Moran House is a historic house museum at 229 Main Street in East Hampton, New York. Built in 1884, it was the home of Mary Nimmo Moran and Thomas Moran, both accomplished painters of the nineteenth century. The house was designated a National Historic Landmark in 1965 for its association with Thomas Moran, the first major painter to bring scenes of the American West to the rest of the country. The house has been restored and opened to the public by reservation under the care of the East Hampton Historical Society.

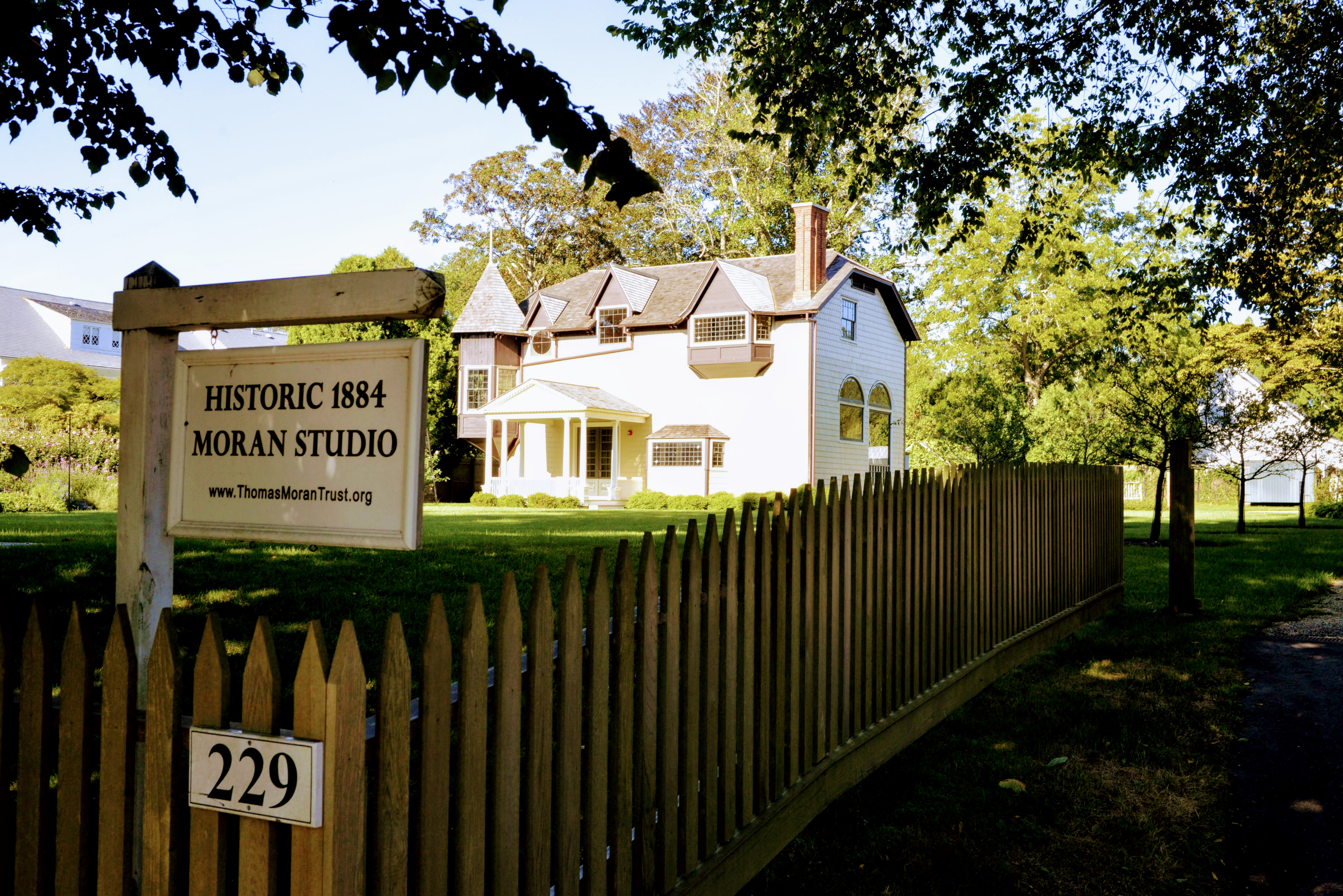
View of the artist residence on Main St - Hudson River school

== Description and history ==
The Thomas and Mary Nimmo Moran House stands in the village of East Hampton, on the west side of Main Street between Woods Lane and Mill Hill Lane. It is an eclectic two-story frame structure, built in 1884 by Thomas Moran using predominantly recycled construction materials. The main room in the house, which dominates the front facade was Thomas Moran's studio. It is a large and airy room with 20-foot ceilings where Moran completed many of his works. Moran entertained many visitors and fellow artists in his home, including J. Thompson and Robert Wood.

The house was the Morans' primary residence from 1884 until Thomas' death in 1926. He and Mary are buried in the South Side Cemetery by the Town Pond. The house remained privately owned until 2004 when its owner Elizabeth Lamb died and left it to the owners of Guild Hall (East Hampton's cultural center dedicated in 1931 which is several blocks from the Moran House). The house had fallen into considerable disrepair. In June 2008, the house was transferred to the Thomas Moran Trust in order to raise funds for the restoration of the structure. That restoration was finished in early 2018.

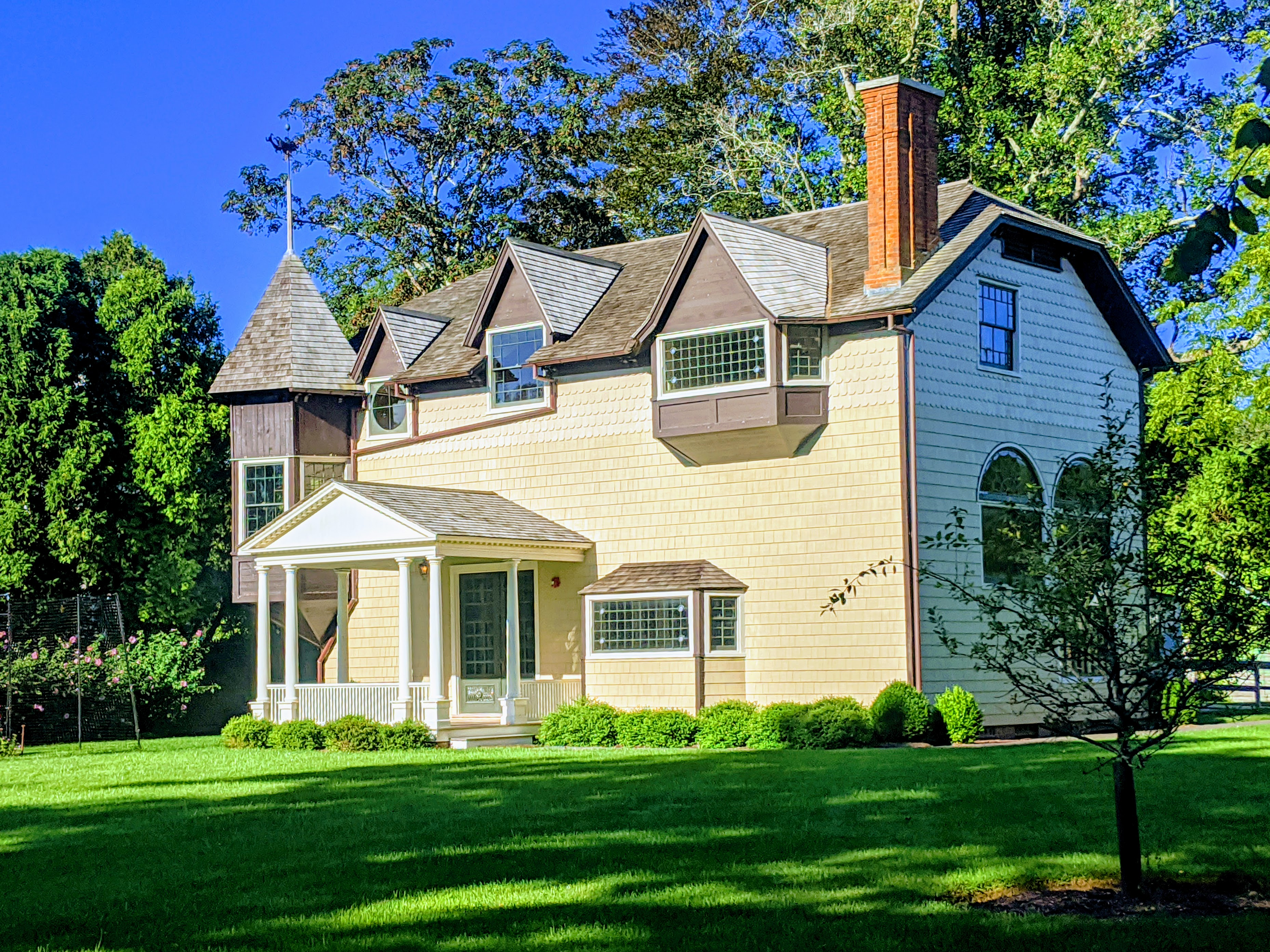
The artist's residence and studio is a museum in East Hampton

== See also ==
- List of National Historic Landmarks in New York
- National Register of Historic Places listings in Suffolk County, New York
