= Stephen Sherrill House =

Historic house in New York, United States

- U.S. National Register of Historic Places
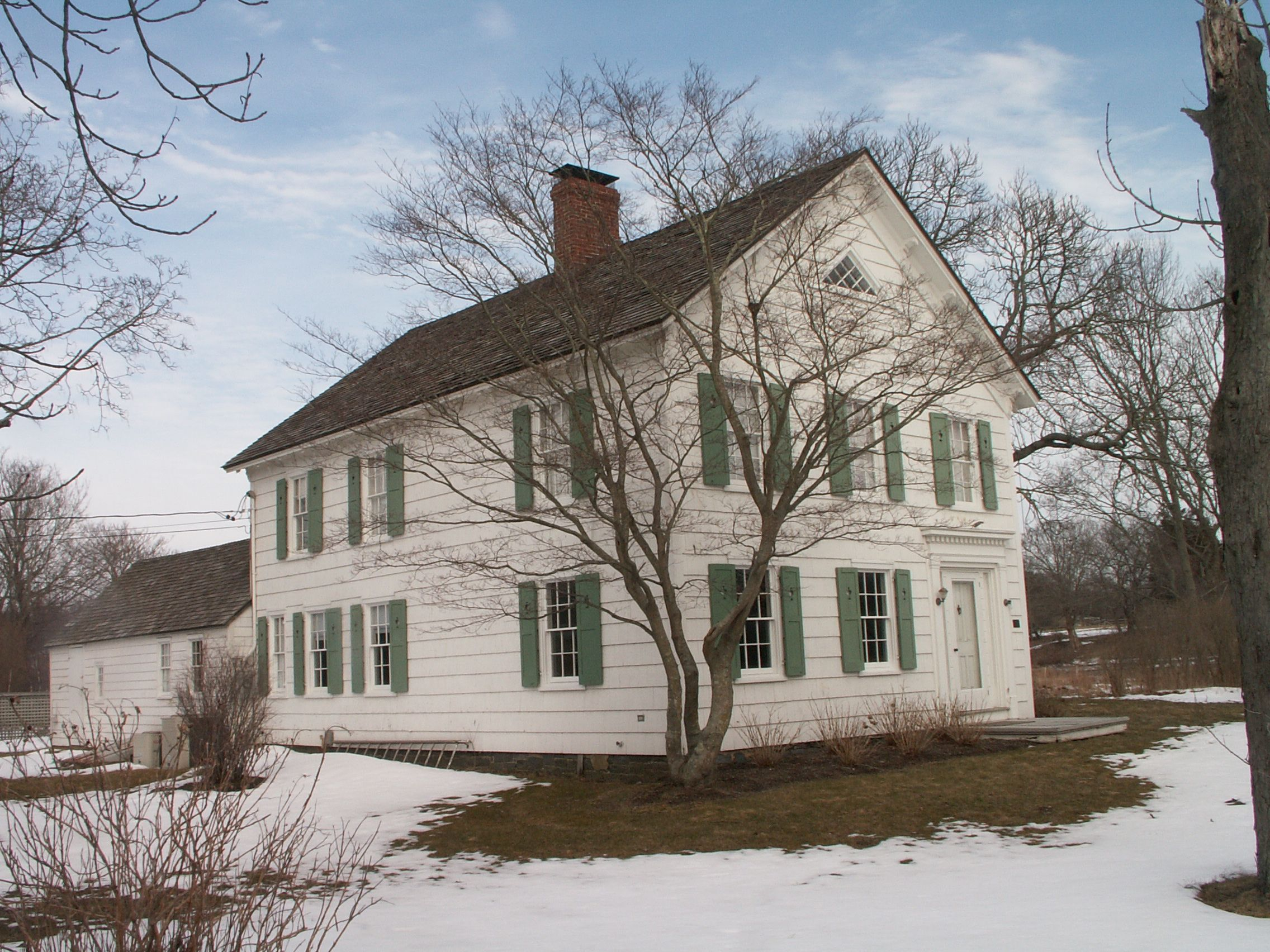
- Sherrill Farmhouse, March 2009

- Location within New York Location within the United States
- Location: 4 Fireplace Rd., East Hampton, New York
- Coordinates: 40°58′22″N 72°10′53″W
- Area: 1 acre (0.40 ha)
- Built: 1857
- Architectural style: Greek Revival, Italianate
- NRHP reference No.: 95001486
- Added to NRHP: January 4, 1996

Stephen Sherrill House is a historic home located at East Hampton in Suffolk County, New York. It was built in 1857 and is a frame Greek Revival / Italianate residence. It is a two-story, gable front, side entrance residence with a three bay wide front facade. Also on the property is the former kitchen wing believed to date to 1802 and moved to its present location in 1927, and a wind pump tower.

It was added to the National Register of Historic Places in 1996.

== Gallery ==
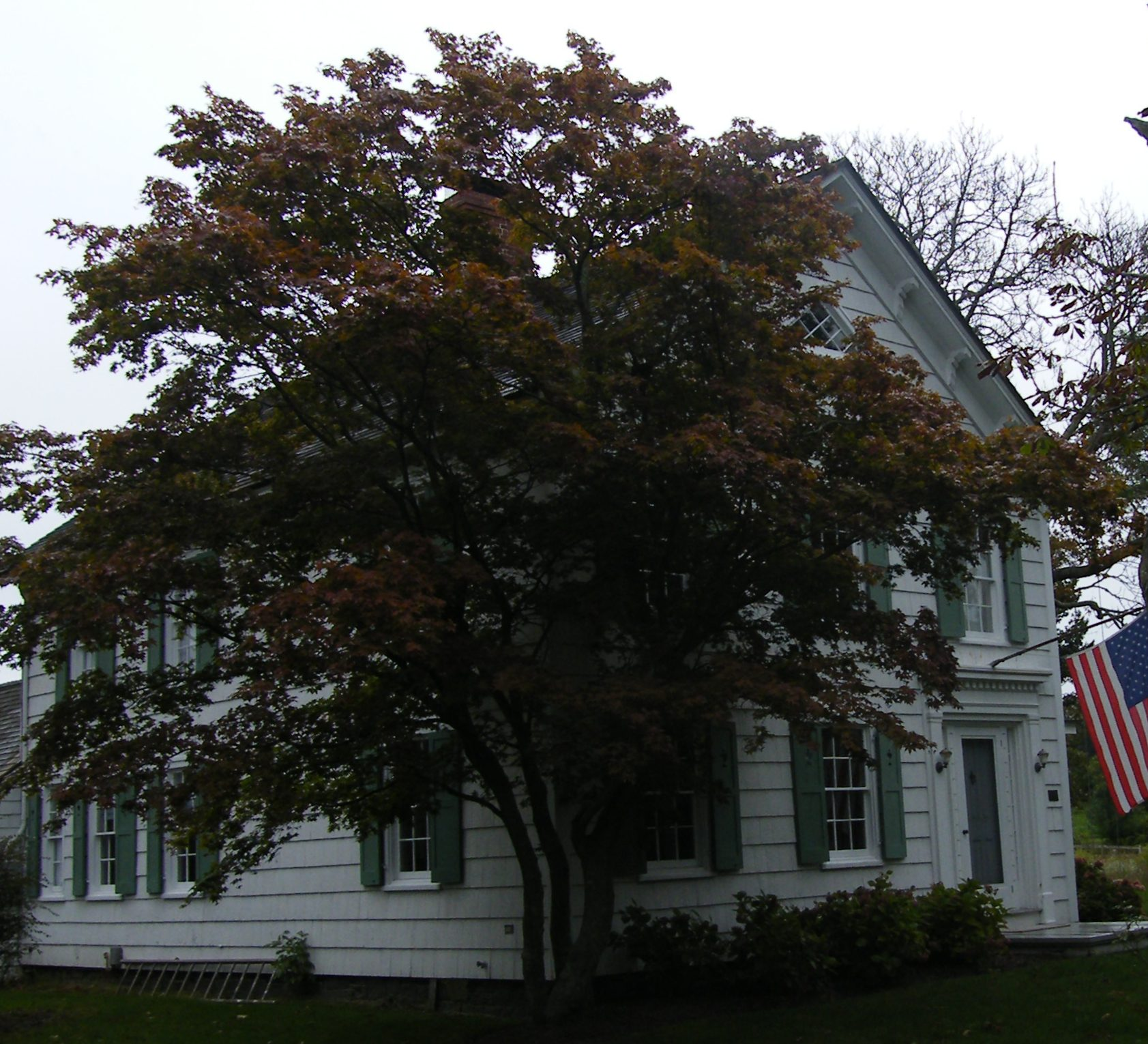
Stephen Sherrill House during the Summer
