= Buell's Lane Historic District =

Historic district in New York, United States

- U.S. National Register of Historic Places
- U.S. Historic district
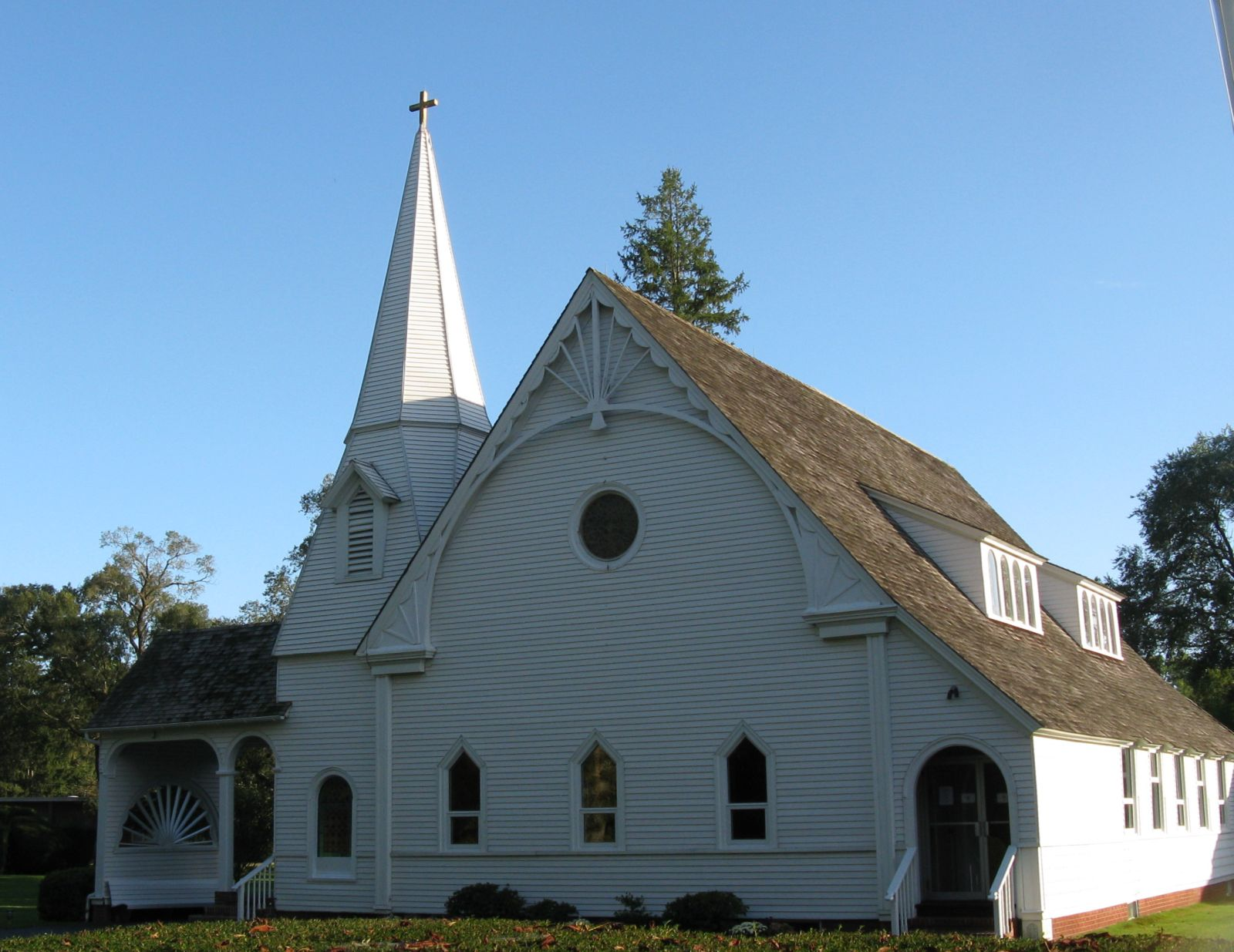
- Most Holy Trinity Church, September 2008

- Location within New York Location within the United States
- Location: 47-114 Buell's La., East Hampton, New York
- Coordinates: 40°57′33″N 72°11′56″W
- Area: 17 acres (6.9 ha)
- Architect: Aldrich, John; Et al.
- Architectural style: Bungalow/Craftsman, Late Victorian
- MPS: Village of East Hampton MRA
- NRHP reference No.: 88001027
- Added to NRHP: July 21, 1988

Buell's Lane Historic District is a national historic district located at East Hampton, New York in Suffolk County, New York. The district includes 25 contributing buildings; 20 principal buildings and five outbuildings. The district is almost exclusively residential and represent variations of late Victorian period vernacular design built between 1884 and about 1910. Also included in the district is Most Holy Trinity Church (formerly St. Philomena's Church), built in 1894, and a two-story wagon shop built in 1896.

It was added to the National Register of Historic Places in 1988.
