= Egypt Lane Historic District =

Historic district in New York, United States

- U.S. National Register of Historic Places
- U.S. Historic district
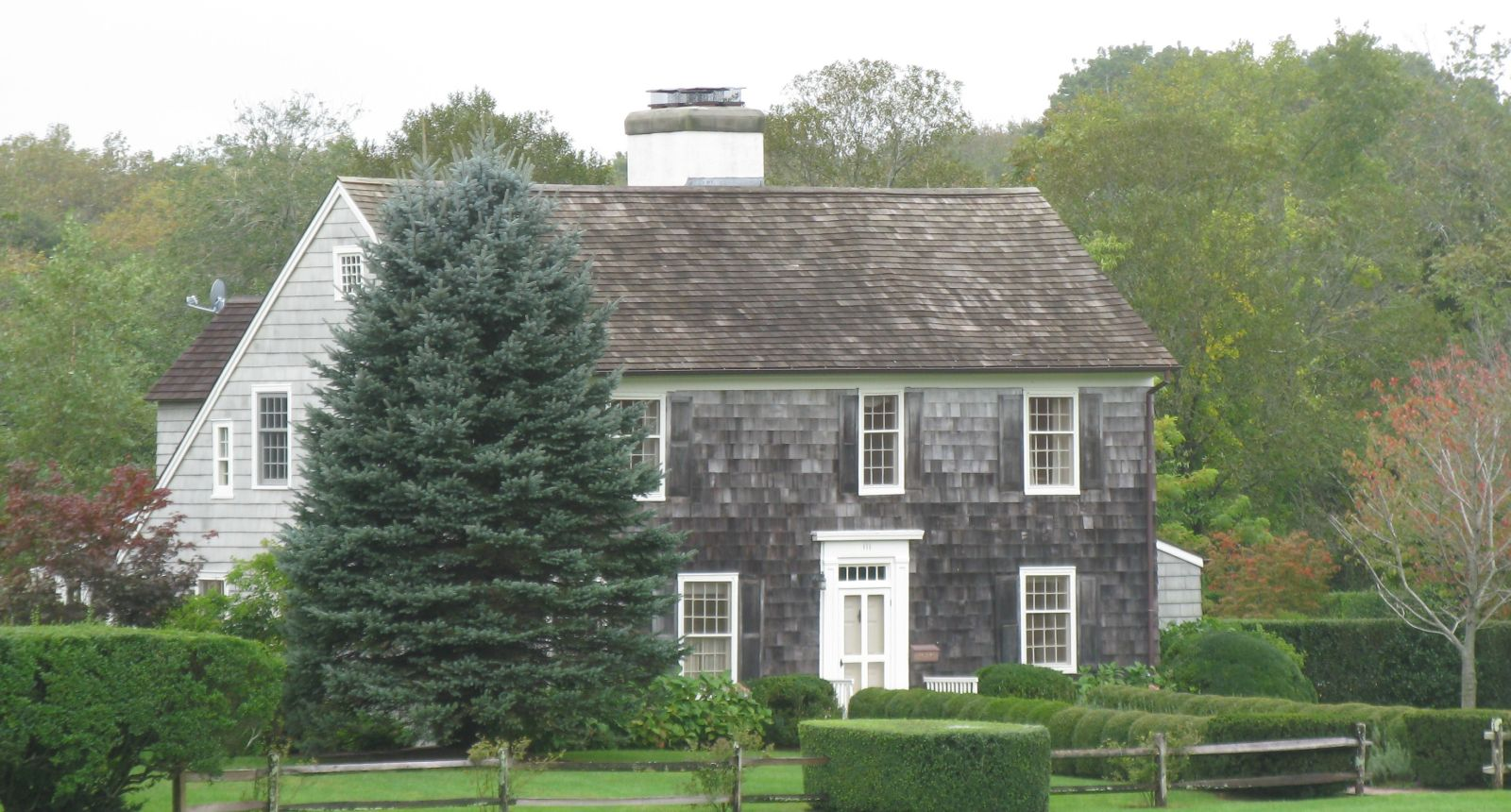
- Saltbox on Egypt Lane, September 2008

- Location within New York Location within the United States
- Location: 111, 117, and 129 Egypt La., East Hampton, New York
- Coordinates: 40°57′30″N 72°10′39″W
- Area: 6 acres (2.4 ha)
- Architect: Hamlin, John E.; Et al.
- Architectural style: Colonial Revival, Federal, Salt-box
- MPS: Village of East Hampton MRA
- NRHP reference No.: 88001031
- Added to NRHP: July 21, 1988

Egypt Lane Historic District is a national historic district located at East Hampton, New York in Suffolk County, New York. The district includes six contributing buildings; three principal buildings and three outbuildings. The principal buildings are dwellings in the Colonial Revival, Federal, and Saltbox styles.

It was added to the National Register of Historic Places in 1988.
