= Northwest Harbor, New York =

- Census-designated place
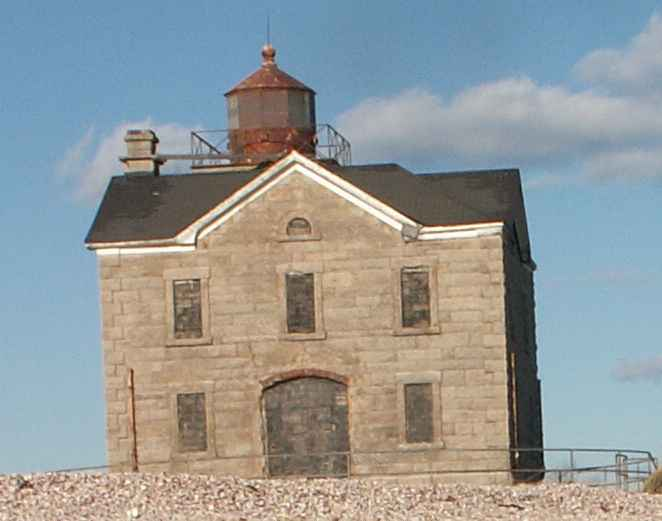
- Cedar Point Lighthouse

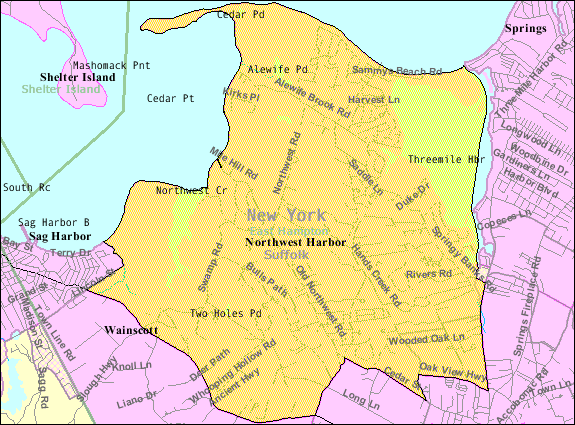

- Location within New York
- Coordinates: 41°0′29″N 72°12′41″W
- Country: United States
- State: New York
- County: Suffolk
- Town: East Hampton

Area
  - Total: 20.05 sq mi (51.93 km^{2})
  - Land: 14.47 sq mi (37.49 km^{2})
  - Water: 5.57 sq mi (14.43 km^{2})
- Elevation: 79 ft (24 m)

Population (2020)
  - Total: 4,637
  - Density: 320.3/sq mi (123.68/km^{2})
- Time zone: UTC-5 (Eastern (EST))
  - Summer (DST): UTC-4 (EDT)
- FIPS code: 36-53852
- GNIS feature ID: 1867412

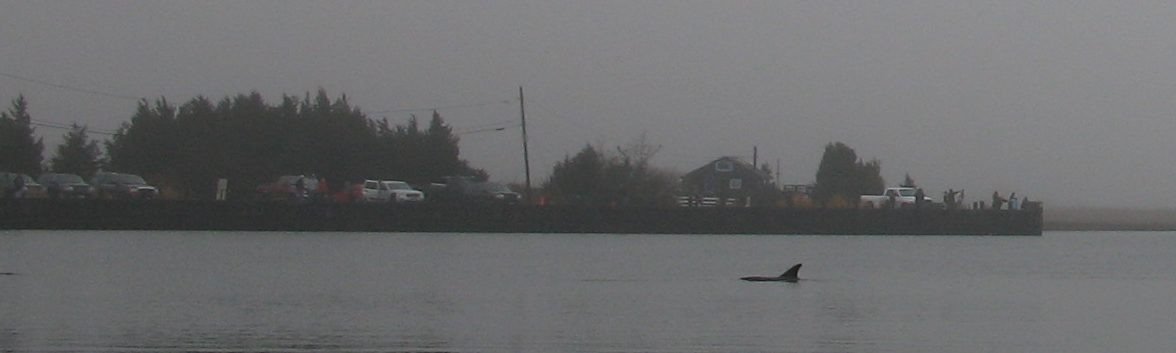
Common dolphins at Northwest Landing in Northwest Harbor

Northwest Harbor is a hamlet and census-designated place (CDP) in the Town of East Hampton, Suffolk County, New York, United States. As of the 2020 census, Northwest Harbor had a population of 4,637.

It is named for the bay on the South Fork of Long Island connecting Sag Harbor, Shelter Island and the town of East Hampton to Gardiners Bay and the open waters of the Atlantic Ocean. The bay derives its name from being northwest of East Hampton village. The name "Northwest Harbor" is applied to the Northwest Woods neighborhood (sometimes shortened to simply "Northwest") of the town of East Hampton. It is also applied to Northwest Landing at Northwest Creek (a saltwater outlet from the inlet to the harbor) which was the first port for East Hampton and which became a major whaling port in the late 17th and early 18th centuries until it was replaced by Sag Harbor two miles to the west of the landing, where the water was deeper. Ships of Sag Harbor must pass through Northwest Harbor at the Cedar Point Lighthouse in order to reach Gardiners Bay and the open ocean.

== History ==
During the American Revolution it was the site of two conflicts, including the Meigs Raid, in which Americans burned Sag Harbor and captured 90 British soldiers, and an incident in which Isaac Van Scoy killed a British soldier with a pitchfork. The British were to conduct another raid during the War of 1812.

During the Great Hurricane of 1938, sand all but enclosed the harbor at its mouth at the Cedar Point Lighthouse, leaving only a narrow channel into Gardiners Bay.

In January 2007, Northwest Landing made national news in efforts to save several common dolphins that had swum up the creek.

== Geography ==
According to the United States Census Bureau, the CDP has a total area of 16.1 square miles (42 km^{2}), of which 14.5 square miles (38 km^{2}) is land and 1.6 square miles (4.1 km^{2}), or 9.81%, is water.

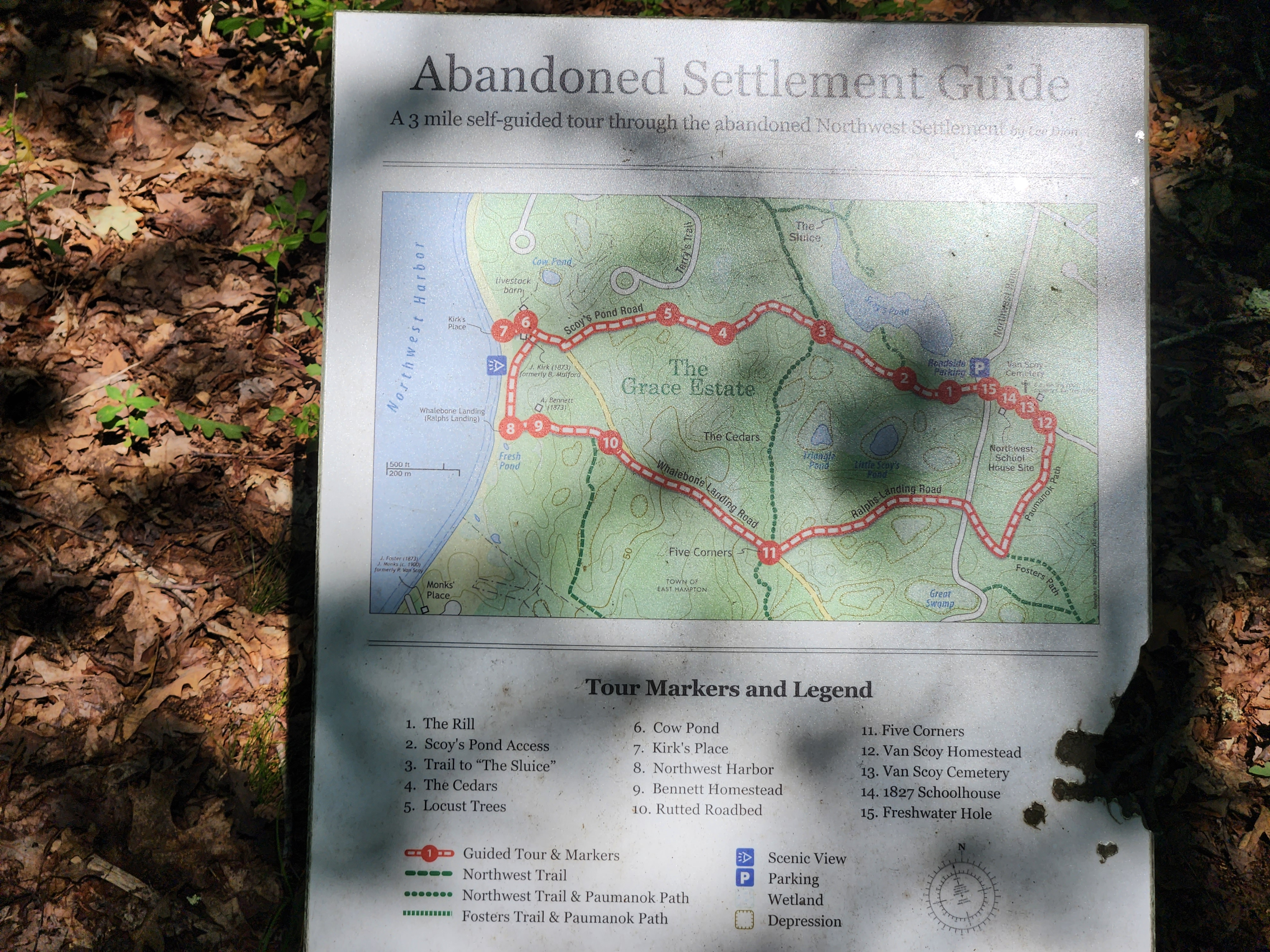
Northwest Trail marker at Van Scoy-Edwards homestead

Historical population
Census	Pop.	Note	%±
2020	4,637		—
U.S. Decennial Census

== Demographics ==
=== 2020 census ===
As of the 2020 census, Northwest Harbor had a population of 4,637. The median age was 49.5 years. 16.6% of residents were under the age of 18 and 24.0% of residents were 65 years of age or older. For every 100 females there were 100.0 males, and for every 100 females age 18 and over there were 101.1 males age 18 and over.

91.8% of residents lived in urban areas, while 8.2% lived in rural areas.

There were 1,912 households in Northwest Harbor, of which 23.1% had children under the age of 18 living in them. Of all households, 53.0% were married-couple households, 18.5% were households with a male householder and no spouse or partner present, and 22.2% were households with a female householder and no spouse or partner present. About 26.8% of all households were made up of individuals and 12.4% had someone living alone who was 65 years of age or older.

There were 3,512 housing units, of which 45.6% were vacant. The homeowner vacancy rate was 2.3% and the rental vacancy rate was 19.9%.

Racial composition as of the 2020 census
Race	Number	Percent
White	3,462	74.7%
Black or African American	88	1.9%
American Indian and Alaska Native	36	0.8%
Asian	113	2.4%
Native Hawaiian and Other Pacific Islander	7	0.2%
Some other race	527	11.4%
Two or more races	404	8.7%
Hispanic or Latino (of any race)	863	18.6%

=== 2000 census ===
As of the census of 2000, there were 3,059 people, 1,181 households, and 818 families residing in the CDP. The population density was 210.6 inhabitants per square mile (81.3/km^{2}). There were 3,008 housing units at an average density of 207.1 per square mile (80.0/km^{2}). The racial makeup of the CDP was 90.49% White, 3.63% African American, 0.16% Native American, 1.05% Asian, 0.03% Pacific Islander, 2.62% from other races, and 2.03% from two or more races. Hispanic or Latino of any race were 9.15% of the population.

There were 1,181 households, out of which 33.8% had children under the age of 18 living with them, 55.2% were married couples living together, 9.2% had a female householder with no husband present, and 30.7% were non-families. 22.6% of all households were made up of individuals, and 8.2% had someone living alone who was 65 years of age or older. The average household size was 2.59 and the average family size was 3.04.

In the CDP, the population was spread out, with 25.2% under the age of 18, 4.8% from 18 to 24, 27.3% from 25 to 44, 28.7% from 45 to 64, and 13.9% who were 65 years of age or older. The median age was 41 years. For every 100 females, there were 98.0 males. For every 100 females age 18 and over, there were 96.5 males.

The median income for a household in the CDP was $61,808, and the median income for a family was $78,873. Males had a median income of $51,469 versus $41,161 for females. The per capita income for the CDP was $35,112. About 4.4% of families and 5.3% of the population were below the poverty line, including 4.2% of those under age 18 and 10.3% of those age 65 or over.
