= Northstowe =

Town in Cambridgeshire, England

Coordinates: 52°16′50″N 0°03′40″E

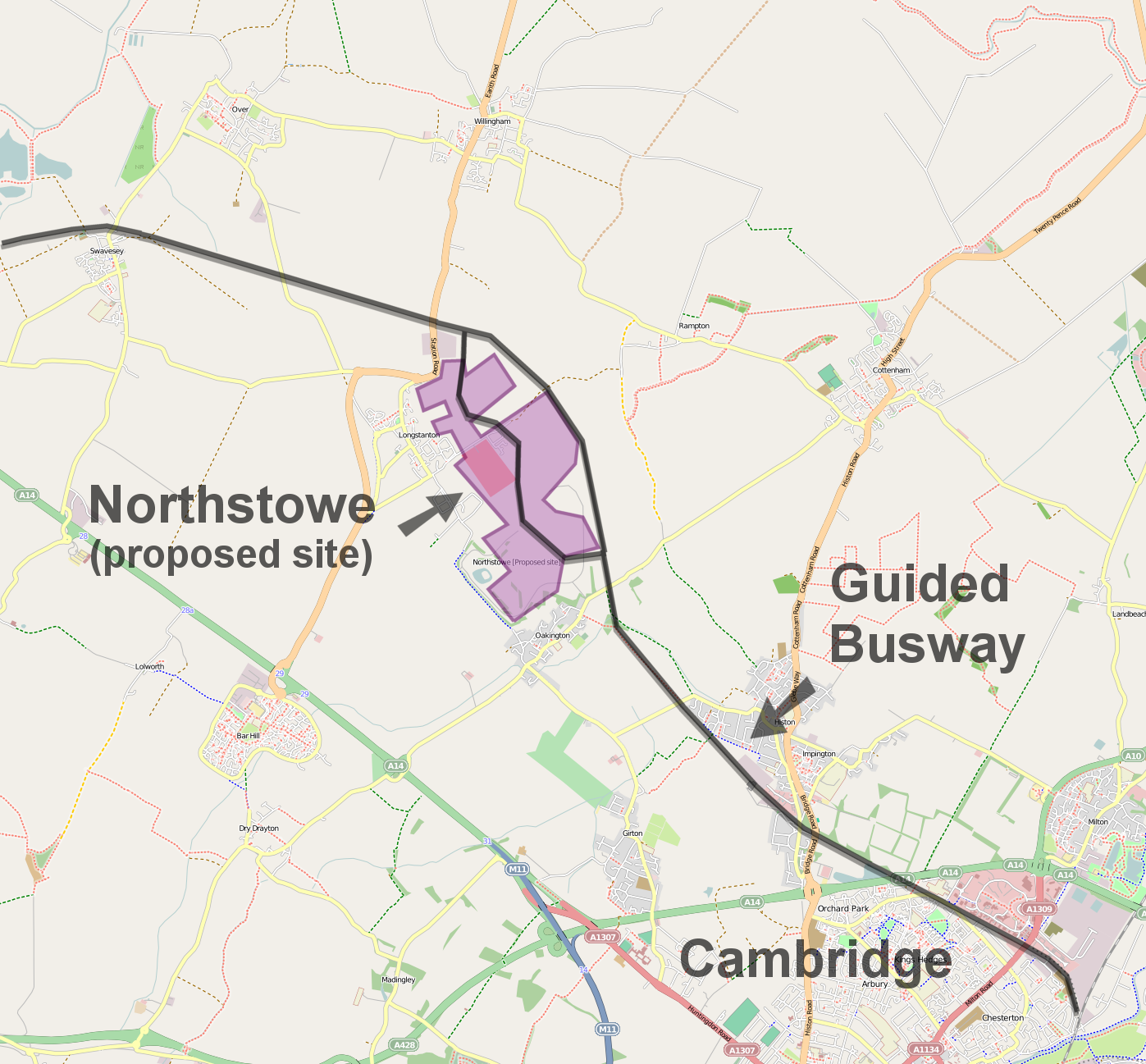
- Map showing the site of Northstowe and the route of the Cambridgeshire Guided Busway

- Location within Cambridgeshire
- Population: 2,356 (2021)
- OS grid reference: TL412645
- Civil parish: Northstowe
- District: South Cambridgeshire
- Shire county: Cambridgeshire
- Region: East
- Country: England
- Sovereign state: United Kingdom
- Post town: CAMBRIDGE
- Postcode district: CB24
- Police: Cambridgeshire
- Fire: Cambridgeshire
- Ambulance: East of England
- UK Parliament: St Neots and Mid Cambridgeshire

Northstowe is a town in Cambridgeshire, England, forecast to have 25,400 residents in 15,000 homes. On 1 April 2021 Northstowe became a civil parish formed from Longstanton and Oakington and Westwick, with the first town council elected on 6 May of that year.

Northstowe has been in development including the planning stages for around 15 years and through varying political administrations. Originally proposed to be "an exemplar of sustainability in the use of renewable energy resources and reducing carbon emissions", Northstowe incorporates sustainable features including drainage and access to the Cambridgeshire Guided Busway. The development is being led by Homes England, the successor body to the Homes and Communities Agency, and the developers chosen by Gallagher Estates (part of L&Q). These include Taylor Wimpey, Barratt homes, David Wilson homes, vistry groups linden and Bovis homes respectively, Bellway homes and keepmoat homes

== Planning milestones ==
South Cambridgeshire District Council (SCDC) produced an Area Action Plan in the mid-2000s to guide the development. In March 2007 planning inspectors recommended that Northstowe should consist of 10,000 homes rather than the 8,000 originally planned, and ruled that a country park need not be incorporated. The news was greeted with concern by many in the area who feared further expansion in the future.

A planning application for the new town was submitted to SCDC on 19 December 2007. Plans included the construction of around 9,500 homes, a town centre area, schools and employment areas.

In February 2012 a Development Framework Document was adopted by the planning authority to progress the town. The plan envisages a maximum of 10,000 new homes created in phases building services and facilities along with homes piece by piece, the first being to the north adjoining the existing Longstanton park-and-ride site owned by Gallagher and the second on the former Government-owned barracks. In October 2012, SCDC approved the first phase including 1500 homes, a primary school, road improvements and a local centre, with completion of the whole town envisaged after about 25 years.

In 2015 outline consent was also agreed in principle to build a further 3,500 homes, a town centre, 3 more schools including a secondary school education campus and a link road to the A14, plus a road linking the town to the Guided Busway. The homes in phase two could not be occupied until a major A14 upgrade is completed which started in 2016 and was completed in early 2020.

In May 2020 the outline planning applications for the third and final phase were submitted for 5,000 homes, consisting of 4,000 homes on phase 3a and 1,000 homes on phase 3b.

== History ==
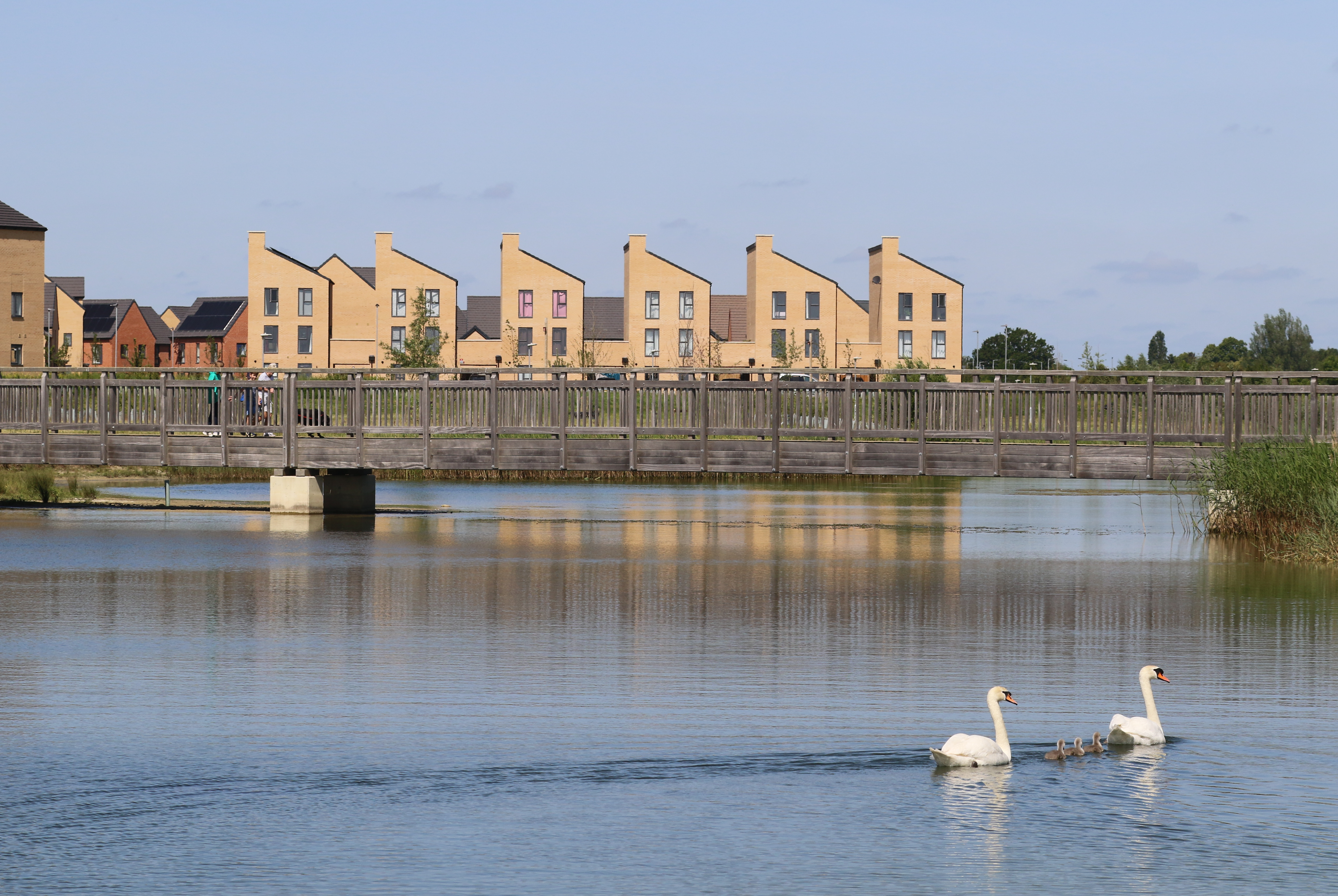
A lake on the Northstowe development site.

The site covers Oakington Barracks on the former RAF Oakington, a World War II airfield which was used for Short Stirling bomber forces and other assorted units. It was used for flight training until the 1970s.

From 2000 to 2010 the barracks was leased to the Home Office for use as the Oakington Immigration Reception Centre.

In 2007 minister Yvette Cooper announced that Northstowe would be designed with energy and water efficiency standards up to 50% above conventional buildings. In January 2008, however, Cooper confirmed in Parliament that Northstowe had not been adopted as an eco-town because the planning application "predate[s] the eco-towns programme", and because it would not be zero-carbon.

In the phase one Local Management Study, published in February 2006 it was suggested that a community-based energy company might be formed, owning assets such as wind turbines or combined heat and power plants for the benefit of the town, perhaps based on the models of the Vauban district of Freiburg, Germany, and the cooperative energy companies of Denmark and Sweden. Car clubs, cycling and walking were also envisaged. In March 2006 the site was acquired by English Partnerships who subsequently became the Homes and Communities Agency and now Homes England.

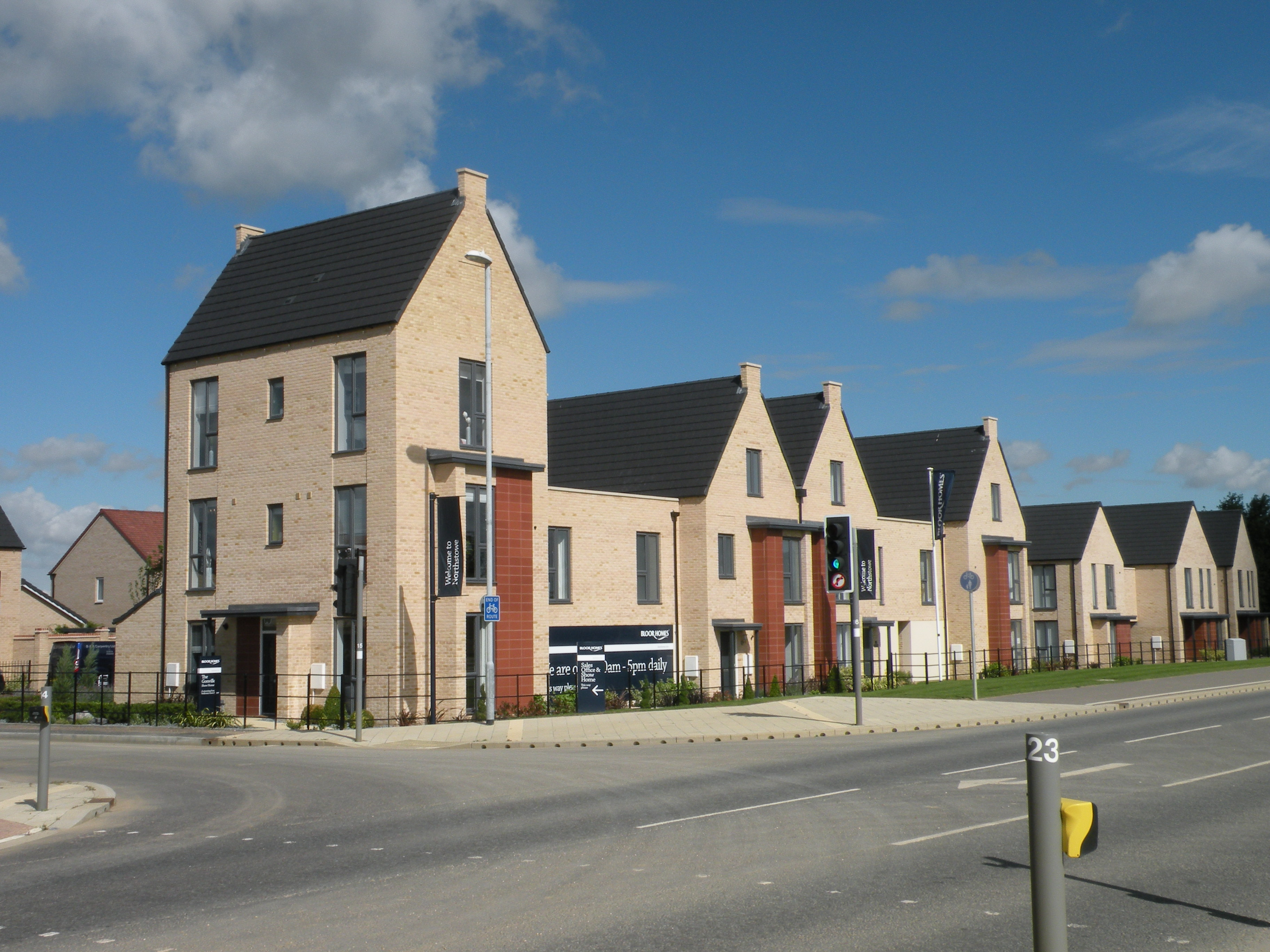
First houses built by Bloor Homes

In 2015 outline consent was also agreed in principle to build a further 3,500 homes, a town centre, 3 more schools including a secondary school education campus and a link road to the A14, plus a road linking the town to the Guided Busway. Planning permission was granted in January 2017. The homes in phase two could not be occupied until a major A14 upgrade was completed.

In April 2016, Bloor Homes was named as the first housebuilder for the site with 92 new homes planned in a range of types and sizes up to five bedrooms.

Northstowe was announced as an NHS Healthy New Town in March 2016. A Healthy Living Strategy for Northstowe was commended at the Landscape Institute awards 2018.

In the spring of 2018, Homes England invested £55 million to provide a new road linking the town to the upgraded A14 and other essential infrastructure to allow more homes to be built.

In the spring of 2019 Homes England built their new regional office at Northstowe, designed and built off site using modern methods of construction (MMC) to help pioneer new techniques in the construction sector.

In February 2020 a planning application was submitted to build a new heritage centre adjacent to the Homes England offices to showcase the historical artefacts found on site and more importantly during the construction of the nearby upgraded A14.

As of May 2020 approximately 550 homes in Northstowe were occupied, with the Bloor Homes site completed and 5 active housebuilding sites: Bovis Homes with some marketed and sold by Domovo Homes (a subsidy of bpha), Linden Homes, Taylor Wimpey and Barratt Homes as both Barratt and David Wilson Homes brands. Playing fields, allotments, and public spaces were under development.

In 2020 Urban Splash in partnership with the Japanese construction company Sekesui started building the first of 406 homes in phase 2 via modular building techniques. House by Urban Splash fell into administration in May 2022, leaving a handful of homes in the scheme incomplete.

By August 2026, 1840 homes were occupied, of the planned eventual total of 9500.

== Amenities ==
Pathfinder primary school opened in September 2017. The buildings were initially used by Hatton Park Primary School from Longstanton for the 2016/17 school year to allow renovation of their school. The Northstowe Secondary College opened in 2019 and is operated by Cambridge Meridian Academies Trust. As of 2024 academic year the education campus comprised a nursery, additional primary school, an SEN school, the secondary school and a sixth form.

In 2020 Homes England submitted a Town Centre Strategy, setting out the principles for a new town centre to be developed for the town. The Strategy proposes a shift away from a reliance on retail on its high street, and instead focuses on the potential of creative industries, leisure, education, high-quality food and small-scale manufacturing.

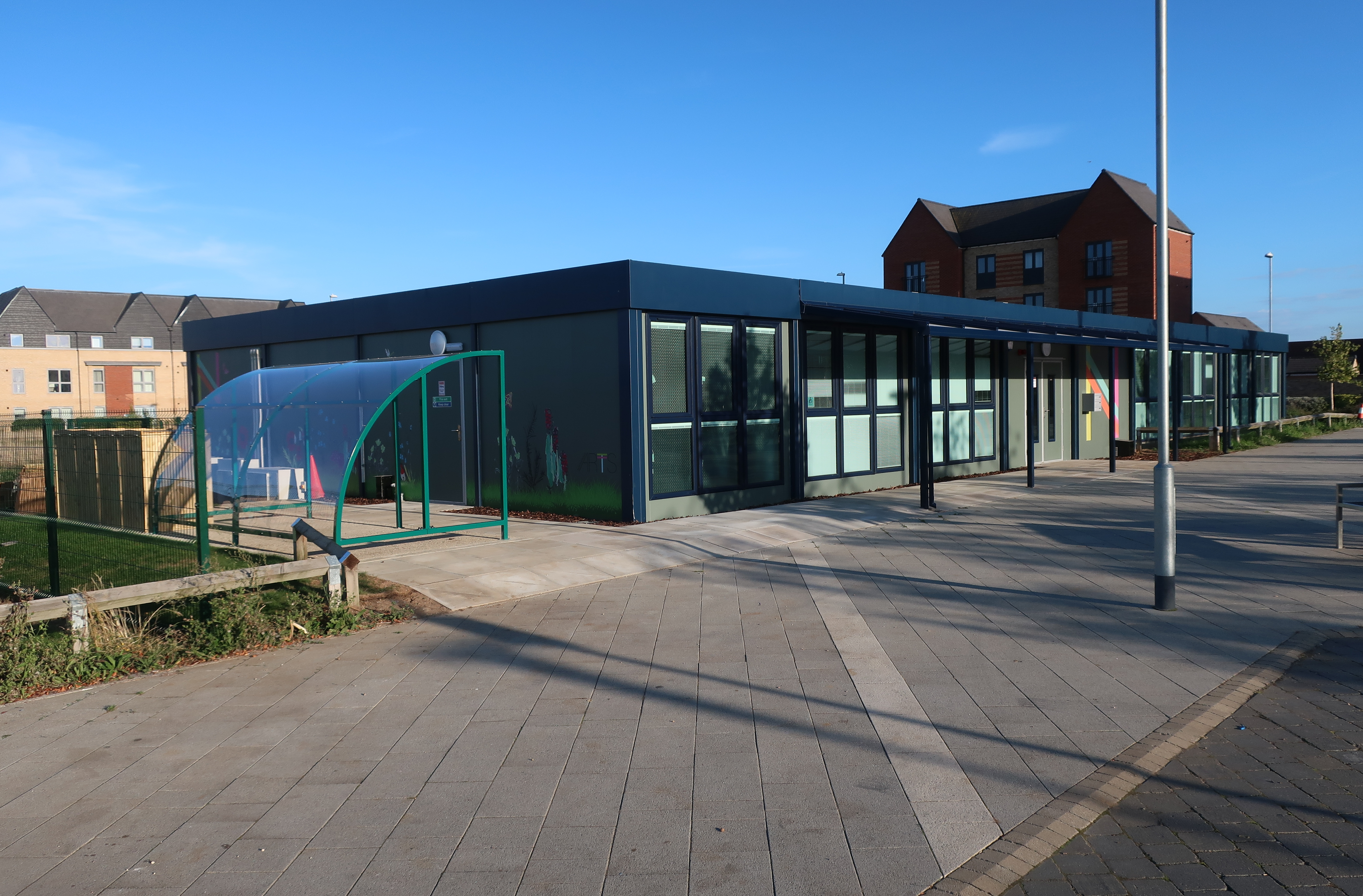
The temporary combined community centre and NHS facility, which opened in 2023

A temporary combined community centre and NHS facility, built out of nine portacabins, was opened in 2023, with a permanent centre due to open in 2026. The town's sports pavilion was completed in October 2023, and opened in January 2024, with many users of the secondary school facilities on weekday evenings for a range of sports and activities. "Northstowe Tap & Social"—a bar, cafe, bakery and events space—opened in April 2024.

A Parkrun started around the first of the new lakes in June 2024

The Unity Centre prior to opening in March 2026

A permanent community centre named "Unity Centre" opened in March 2026 following 12 months of construction. It offers meeting rooms, space for a cafe, a multi-use hall, an activity space, a room for NHS services, and a landscaped courtyard. It is operated by Northstowe Town Council.

In May 2026 a BMX pump track opened near the secondary college as the first part of the Phase 2 sports facilities, with the adjacent grass pitches in preparation

== Public transport ==
Northstowe is linked to Cambridge and St Ives by the Cambridgeshire Guided Busway which opened in 2011. There is a stop at Longstanton Park & Ride, with a further busway loop through the town under construction and bus stops by the Unity Centre.

== See also ==
- Code for Sustainable Homes
- Sustainable Communities Plan
- Millennium Communities Programme
- New towns in the United Kingdom
- Energy efficiency in British housing
- Low-energy building
- Ecocities
