= Urban Eden =

Pressure group from Milton Keyes

Urban Eden is a pressure group based in Milton Keynes, England, formed in 2006. The group states that its aim is to "promote a sustainable expansion to the original masterplan for Milton Keynes". In recent years the expansion of Milton Keynes has moved away from the original design principles of the city; Urban Eden campaigns against this trend, pressuring for new developments to remain true to the original vision for the new city. As of 2009 the group says that it has over one hundred members, including a number of professional engineers and town planners, as well as some former employees of the Milton Keynes Development Corporation.

== Campaigns ==
According to their main website, Urban Eden's main campaign focuses can be broadly summarised to the following:

- Grid roads
- Building density
- Tree protection
- The redway network
- Pedestrian underpasses and footbridges
- The Boulevards of Central Milton Keynes
- The linear park system
- Architecture
- Layout of expansion areas

The first two of these points are expanded below.

== The grid system ==
One of Urban Eden's primary goals is the continued expansion of the Milton Keynes grid road system. The system, unique in the UK, is based around a grid layout of national speed limit, landscaped roads, many of them dual carriageways, situated on average 1 km apart. The original grid roads were designed to take extraneous traffic between neighborhoods rather than through them. The current plans for the expansion of Milton Keynes do not extend this system, instead constructing 30 miles per hour (48 km/h) roads that Milton Keynes Partnership describe as 'city streets', which form the spine roads of the new districts. The group argues that these city streets do not provide sufficient room for future expansion, restrict pedestrian, cycle and car movement and are dangerous. They argue that the grid system, with its lack of frontage development and its regular pedestrian/cycle underpasses, provides a much safer pedestrian/cycle environment and allows all modes of transport to move more freely. On the other hand, Milton Keynes Partnership argue that the grid system may not be the most sustainable transport system for the expansion areas, and creates a barrier effect between residential areas.

== Building density ==
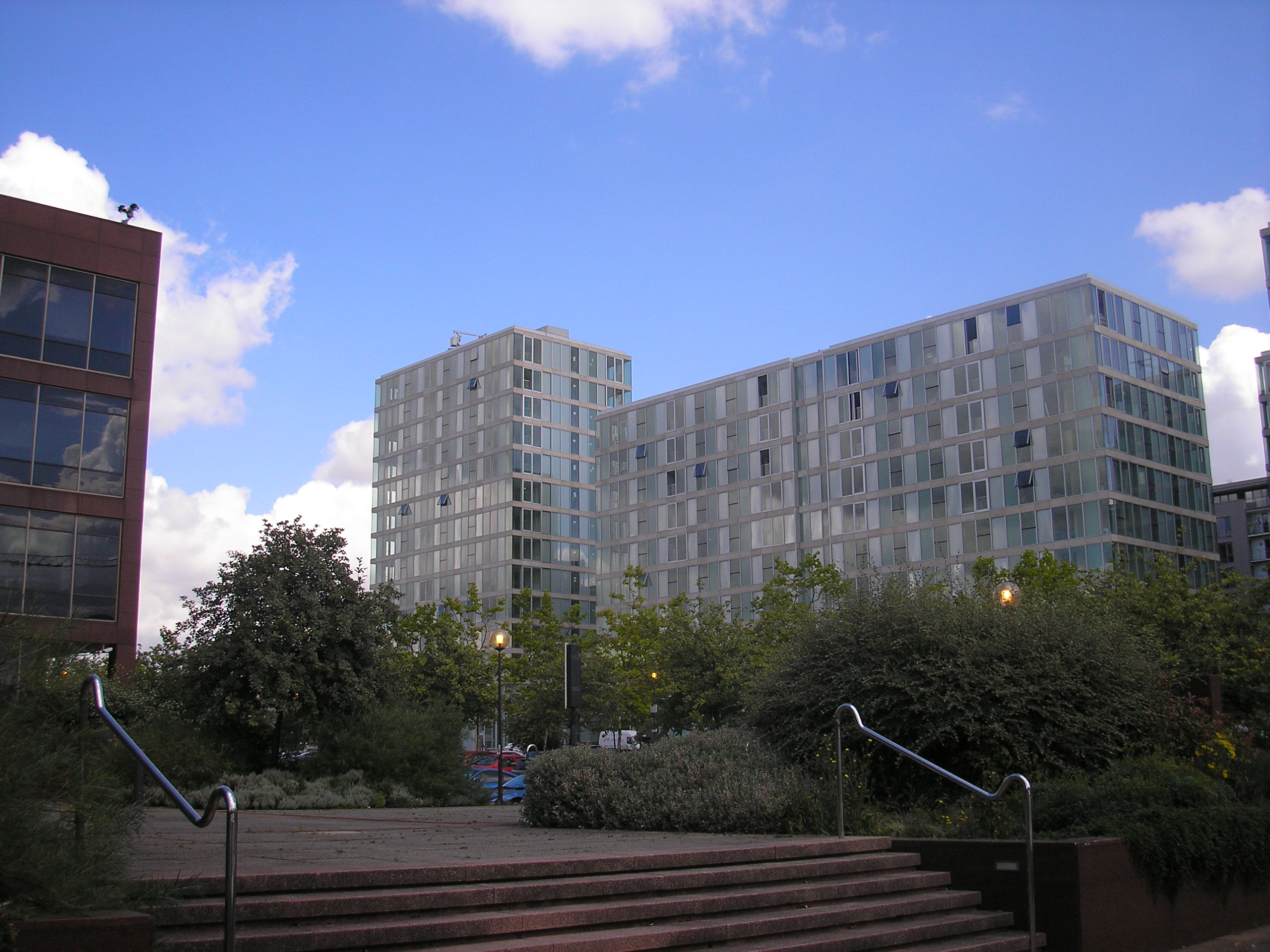
The hub:MK complex, one of the new high-rise developments in Central Milton Keynes. Urban Eden has objected to this development specifically, due to its direct frontage onto nearby roads.

Milton Keynes, from its conception in 1967, has always been a low-density city. Notwithstanding the various areas of parkland dotted around the city, the residential districts themselves are laid out with generous amounts of open space for a British settlement. However, as is the current policy across the UK, developments have tended towards higher densities over the last decade. Recently Central Milton Keynes has seen the construction of tower blocks, something which was excluded in the original city masterplan. New districts such as Broughton have been built to much higher densities than ever before seen in Milton Keynes. Milton Keynes Partnership, a subsidiary of Homes and communities agency and the organisation in control of the expansion of Milton Keynes, argues that higher densities are necessary to deliver high-quality transport systems and meet housing targets. Urban Eden argues that the high-density districts have the potential to become "instant slums" and are out of place in a city which has always been built at a low density. High-density districts are now being built in many towns and cities across the country, and this debate is not limited to Milton Keynes.

== Urban Eden in local media ==
The group's activities have attracted much attention from the local media, as well as a small amount of national media attention. The group's chairman, Theo Chalmers, writes a monthly column for a local business magazine on the matters campaigned on by the group. In 2006, the group ran a two-page article in the MK Citizen named "plane crash", describing the cutting of the plane trees in Central Milton Keynes. All in all the group's efforts have resulted in much debate within the Milton Keynes, and their campaigns have drawn the attention of local and regional planning bodies. At least one development within Milton Keynes, the former Millennium Community at Oakgrove, was changed to protect a stretch of grid road that was proposed to be downgraded, although it is unclear as to whether or not this was a result of Urban Eden's campaigning.
