= Sustainable community =

Communities that promote sustainable living

The term "sustainable communities" has various definitions, but in essence refers to communities planned, built, or modified to promote sustainable living. Sustainable communities tend to focus on environmental and economic sustainability, urban infrastructure, social equity, and municipal government. The term is sometimes used synonymously with "green cities," "eco-communities," "livable cities" and "sustainable cities."

Different organizations have various understandings of sustainable communities; the term's definition is contested and still under construction. For example, Burlington, Vermont's Principles of Sustainable Community Development stress the importance of local control of natural resources and a thriving non-profit sector to a sustainable community. The Institute for Sustainable Communities outlines how political empowerment and social well-being are also part of the definition.

Additionally, referring to communities in Shanghai and Singapore, geographer Lily Kong has paired concepts of cultural sustainability and social sustainability alongside environmental sustainability as aspects of sustainable communities. Meanwhile, the UK's 2003 Sustainable Communities Plan often abbreviates its definition of sustainable communities as "places where people want to live and work, now and in the future". Addressing the scale of sustainable communities, political scientist Kent Portney points out that the term sustainable communities has been used to refer to a broad variety of places, ranging from neighborhoods to watersheds to cities to multi-state regions.

Etymologically, the term "sustainable community" grew out of the related discourses of "sustainability" and "sustainable development" that gained widespread use among local, national, and international politicians and policymakers in NGOs starting in the late 1980s. The term originally referred to environmental concerns and was later applied to cities.

== Examples of Sustainable Community initiatives ==
Saint Michael's Sustainable Community in Costa Rica is an example of a sustainable community. It produces more food and water than it requires and uses regenerative agriculture practices.

Sustainable community initiatives have emerged in neighborhoods, cities, counties, metropolitan planning districts, and watershed districts at different scales pertaining to community needs. These initiatives are driven by various actor groups that have different methods of effectively planning out ways to create sustainable communities. Most often they are implemented by governments and non-profit organizations, but they also involve community members, academics, and create partnerships and coalitions. While each community has its distinct needs, stakeholders generally evaluate the indicators of sustainability with regard to system performance, policy, and rapid feedback in order to keep or alter their sustainability programs.

Nonprofit organizations help to cultivate local talents and skills, empowering people to become more powerful and more involved in their own communities. Many also offer plans and guidance on improving the sustainability of various practices, such as land use and community design, transportation, energy efficiency, waste reduction, and climate friendly purchasing.

Some government groups will create partnerships where departments will work together using grants to provide resources to communities like clean air and water, community planning, economic development, equity and environmental justice, as well as housing and transportation choices.

Social movements have gathered momentum, spreading sustainable community ideas around the world, not only through example, but also by offering classes and training on sustainable living, permaculture, and local economics.

== International initiatives ==
=== United Kingdom ===
The Sustainable Communities Plan was launched in 2003 through the Office of the Deputy Prime Minister. Lacking an official national spatial development plan, the UK employed the Sustainable Communities Plan as a regional development plan targeted at the South East of England. Additionally, the plan created the Academy for Sustainable Communities. The £38 billion plan identifies four key growth areas for development and regeneration: the Thames Gateway, Ashford, Kent, London-Stansted-Cambridge-Peterborough (LSCP) and Milton Keynes/South Midlands (MKSM). Designed during a period that projected sustained economic growth into the future, the plan's implementation has been slowed and disjointed, particularly since the Great Recession.

An affordable housing shortage in the UK has also challenged the Plan's implementation.

== National initiatives ==
The Partnership for Sustainable Communities is an interagency partnership between the Department of Transportation, Environmental Protection Agency, and the Department of Housing and Urban Development. These departments work together with a mission to "improve access to affordable housing, increase transportation options, and lower transportation costs while protecting the environment". All three bureaus offer funding opportunities to support communities in areas of clean air and water, community planning, economic development, energy efficiency, equity and environmental justice, as well as housing and transportation choices. The partnership incorporates six principles of livability into its grant-making and program development.:

- Provide more transportation choices
- Promote equitable, affordable housing
- Enhance economic competitiveness
- Support existing communities
- Coordinate policies and leverage investment
- Value communities and neighborhoods

Along with working collaboratively, these government agencies also have their own initiatives. The Department of Housing and Development has an Office of Sustainable Housing and Communities which features a Sustainable Housing Initiative, aiming at "supporting the construction and rehabilitation of green affordable housing" and does this through programs that retrofit or construct energy efficient homes. They also work to standardize energy efficiency standards across federal agencies, as well as expand the availability of financing for home energy improvements and multifamily housing.

The Environmental Protection Agency has a Smart Growth Program which conducts research, publishes reports, showcases outstanding communities, and works with communities through grants and technical assistance. They also have a Green Communities Program which provides communities with a tool kit of information to help them reach sustainable goals. The tool kit is arranged in a five-step program which allows communities to:

- Develop community assessments of their current conditions
- Formulate trend analyses that answers the question "Where are we going?" in the face of no intervention
- Create vision statements of where the community sees itself in the future
- Establish action plans about what programs and initiatives will help the community reach its goals
- Access tools to implement action plans

The Department of Transportation has a Livability Initiative which issues "grants to eligible recipients for planning, vehicle purchases, facility construction, operations, and other purposes", with numerous goals, including the improvement of surface transportation, providing public transit on Indian reservations, providing access to disadvantaged communities, etc.

=== Case Studies from the Partnership for Sustainable Communities ===
The Euclid Corridor in Cleveland

Once a thriving place of business and home to the wealthy and elite, Euclid Avenue in Cleveland had seen a decline in commerce following the Great Depression. During this economic downturn, Cleveland became a shrinking city as many of its residents moved and homes were turned into boarding houses or abandoned altogether.. After decades of work by city leaders and residents to revitalize this part of the city, the bus line HealthLine debuted in 2008. This bus line increased ridership and helped The Euclid Corridor begin to see the redevelopment of abandoned properties as well as investment in development of commerce, to the tune of $4.3 billion. This created thousands of square feet of retail space and thousands of jobs. The success of the revitalization of the Euclid Corridor is due in large part to engaged community leaders, community members, and NGO's like MidTown Cleveland who worked on ensuring that there was a variety of housing investments. EPA assisted with the redevelopment of abandoned space through their brownfield assessment grants and HUD provided mortgage insurance on properties to aid in the development of Euclid Avenue.

Greenville, South Carolina's Westside

Following a shift from the cotton production that once thrived in the west end of Greenville, South Carolina, this part of the city began to see a flight of its residents and with it the abandonment and decay of its buildings and facilities, higher crime rates, and more low-income households. In 2010, HUD and DOT awarded the city $1.8 million to support a three-year planning initiative which sought to improve affordable housing, transportation, and increase economic development. The HUD provided a loan to encourage economic growth, specifically through the conversion of an old cotton warehouse into an area of retail shops, offices, and restaurants known as West End Market.

The success of West End Market led to 230 building permits being issued around the area in a three-year period, resulting in a successful arts district that created jobs as well as drew tourists and locals. EPA assisted with the redevelopment of abandoned space through $200,000 in brownfield assessment grants which allowed for the city to facilitate clean up, or initiate redevelopment. The city also worked with the Federal Highway Administration in demolishing an unnecessary bridge which allowed for the development of a recreational area with a cross bridge, waterfalls, and walking paths, known as Falls Park on the Reedy. In 2005, a mixed-use development was constructed across from Falls Park with a hotel, apartments, restaurants, and retail and office spaces to help further spark economic growth in the area.

Seattle's South Lake Union Neighborhood

With investments in transportation, affordable housing, and green space, Seattle's South Lake Union has transformed from a place of freeway traffic, abandoned warehouses, and parking lots to an economically flourishing neighborhood. An integral part to this transformation was the creation of a street car service, partially funded by the Federal Transit Administration. The streetcar encouraged both Amazon.com and Microsoft to locate campuses in the South Lake Union neighborhood, bringing with it jobs and investment in residential space. The City of Seattle is proposing a zoning change to promote affordable housing and attract market rate development. HUD provided grants to fund building and support services for the chronically homeless, adults and veterans recovering from addiction, and homeless with mental health issues and substance abuse problems. HUD also supplied $5.7 million towards the construction of a senior housing facility. To address the problems with the neighborhoods freeways and lack of sidewalks and crosswalks, a $30 million grant was issued by the DOT to help build crosswalks over 12 intersections, widen sidewalks, add bicycle lanes, as well as beautify the space through the addition of landscaping and trees.

== State initiatives ==
=== Maryland ===
The state of Maryland passed a Sustainable Communities Act in 2010 with the goal of revitalizing and promoting reinvestment in Maryland's older communities as well working to promote "equitable, affordable housing by expanding energy-efficient housing choices for people of all ages, incomes, races, and ethnicity to increase mobility and lower the combined cost of housing and transportation". The law also created the Sustainable Communities Tax Credit Program which promotes private investment in the restoration and development of historic sites. Thanks in part to the Sustainable Communities Tax Credit Program, the neighborhood of Remington, Baltimore was able to refurbish an old tin factory into a space for offices and residences, which led to the development of other properties as well as homes, which increased use and population for the neighborhood.

In 2013 the Maryland General Assembly passed the Sustainable Communities Tax Increment Financing Designation and Financing Law. This law allows for Maryland counties and municipalities to use funds generated from increased property tax values to fund improvement projects in sustainable communities. Sample projects include expanding sidewalks, the development of tree planting on streets and parks, as well as improvements to water and sewer infrastructure to help encourage economic growth and improve quality of life.

=== California ===
The state of California passed the Sustainable Communities and Climate Protection Act of 2008, also known as SB 375. The law aims to reduce greenhouse gas emissions through transportation, housing, and land use planning. Under the SB 375, the state is broken up into Metropolitan Planning Organizations which are each responsible for developing Sustainable Community Strategies that will help the state reach its goal of reduced emissions. These strategies are then evaluated by the California Environmental Protection Agency's Air Resources Board. Under the Sustainable Community Strategy, the city of Sacramento plans to double transit service and increase bike lanes, offering more transportation choices and reducing vehicle emissions. The city of San Diego also plans to increase funding towards more transportation choices as well as promote more multi-family housing near high transit areas. The Southern California Strategies include transit expansion, developing housing closer to public transportation, increasing funding for biking and pedestrians, and the creation of jobs, with most being near public transit.

== City government initiatives ==
Cities are defined as jurisdictional units that have small divisions of government within them. These divisions of government have the authority to affect environmental and ecological results. Cities are especially important in initiating sustainable communities because they have local authorities that "have political power and credibility to take initiatives to access and deploy resources in ways reflecting local conditions that allows them the capacity to manage and lead urban development for the good of the environment." It is also necessary to implement sustainable communities in countries that are industrialized because cities are where most environmental and social problems dwell.

When looking at and comparing sustainable cities certain indicators may be used:

- Does the city have any smart growth programs that are designed to "help manage growth and avoid and eliminate urban sprawl" and minimize impacts on physical environment?
- Does the city have zoning plans that demonstrate goals for the city in a way that create environmentally-sensitive areas and maintain them?
- Does the city follow any legal policies that allow advocates and activists to create programs that would help the city become sustainable?
- How involved in the environmental and social justice movement are programs within the city?
- Is the transportation system of the city set up to encourage public transportation and not private to reduce pollution?
- Are there pollution remediation programs in the city?
- How politically involved are citizens where their voices are equally heard in order to create social justice and a just community?

The 34 elements inside "Taking Sustainable Cities Seriously" can also be used to determine whether a city is considered sustainable or not.

=== City examples ===
The city of San Francisco uses the precautionary principle as a framework to develop laws for a healthier and more just city. The precautionary principle gives more power to community members by allowing them to stand up against corporations in their neighborhoods and leaves the burden of proof to corporations instead of community members. Companies must prove that their endeavors are harmless to the community instead of the community having to prove they have been harmed by company endeavors. This allows for a sustainable community as environmental justice and social justice are created.

The city of Quebec to create a sustainable community through political involvement has dedicated studies to discovering why citizens are or are not politically active. Studies from Quebec have shown that citizens' internal and external efficacy is a large part in determining participation in politics. When citizens lack the internal belief that one can make change in government and the external belief that the government will make changes according to citizen concerns, political participation dwindles as citizens believe no change will occur. When becoming politically active, a citizen takes into account the history of the city government, the government's actions, and government interactions with other citizens.

== Nonprofit and NGO sector ==
The Institute for Sustainable Communities created by former Vermont Governor, Madeleine M. Kunin, leads community based projects around the globe that address environmental, economic, and social issues. Many of these groups help to cultivate local talents and skills, empowering people to become more powerful and involved in their own communities. Many also offer plans and guidance on improving the sustainability of various practices, such as land use and community design, green transportation, energy efficiency, waste reduction, and climate friendly purchasing.

The Global Integrity Project is focused on bringing together top scientists and thinkers from around the world in order to analyze the problems of inequality among humankind. These thinkers examine economic and ethical issues faced in protecting and enhancing our environments and make recommendations on restoration techniques that aid in promoting social justice. They also call for a major and imperative paradigm shift in order to ensure good quality of life for many future generations.

Sustainable Seattle is a nonprofit organization which has created regional indicators for sustainability through grassroots activism and has become a world leader in these sustainability indicators. Sustainable Seattle has printed newsletters on a wide range of sustainable community topics, from building to recycling and more, and they are believed to be the first "sustainable community" organization, founded in 1991. There are now hundreds of "sustainable community" organizations across the US.

== Social movement initiatives ==
The Take Back Your Time Movement, led by John de Graaf, focuses on the concept of working fewer hours and devoting more time to living a healthy lifestyle. The movement suggests that allowing shorter work days and longer vacations would in turn help better distribute work, while also reducing stress and making for healthier living. Additionally, people would have more free time to make more rewarding and sustainable choices for themselves.

The Voluntary Simplicity Movement or Simple Living movement emphasizes reducing one's material possessions and desires and increasing self-sufficiency through skills such as gardening and DIY. The Voluntary Simplicity Movement suggests that one should focus on cultivating their own best inner being rather than focus on making material gains and wealth. It also promotes activism within the community to create engaged, educated citizens.

The Degrowth movement is based on anti-consumerist and anti-capitalist ideas, focusing on reducing consumption and promoting happy, healthy lifestyles in non-consumptive fashions. Main aspects of Degrowth include more equal distribution of workload and sharing work, consuming less, and setting aside time for personal and cultural growth through the arts and creativity.

Movements such as ecovillages are gathering momentum, spreading sustainable community ideas around the world, teaching through example and also offering classes and training on sustainable living, permaculture, and local economics. Ecovillages seek to integrate themselves harmlessly into the ecosystem surrounding them, so as to live and interact in a way that is sustainable and supportive of the natural world.

== Challenges and critiques ==
Sustainable communities, both as individual projects and as a whole, have faced challenges impeding their development and have been met with criticism.

Sustainable communities projects have struggled to take hold for:

- poor economic conditions and inaccessible housing markets: in the UK's Sustainable Communities Plan, the economic downturn of 2008 has led to a general shortage of housing and affordable housing in particular, which run contrary to the plan's premises of livable communities.

Projects have been critiqued for:

- lacking a well-developed environmental justice framework: urban and environmental policy planner Julian Agyeman has written about the "narrow focus" of civic environmentalism that does not take "social justice" into account, and the need for sustainable communities to be democratic and collaborate with the environmental justice movement.
- promoting a securitization agenda: British geographer Mike Raco argues that the UK's Sustainable Communities Plan employs the discourse of sustainability as "a series of potentially repressive and counter-productive policy measures.".
- accommodating to neoliberal economic systems instead of confronting them: while some rationales for sustainable communities conflict with market-driven agendas, economic growth characterizes the means and ends of some initiatives. Additionally, sustainable communities reject the notion that development itself is fundamentally socially divisive or environmentally destructive.
