= Modern methods of construction =

Processes designed to improve upon traditional methods

Modern methods of construction (MMC) is a term used mainly in the UK construction industry to refer to "smart construction" or "industrial construction" processes designed to improve upon traditional design and construction approaches by focusing on (among other things) component and process standardisation, design for manufacture and assembly (DfMA), prefabrication, preassembly, off-site manufacture (including modular building) and onsite innovations such as additive manufacture (3D printing). While such modern approaches have been applied to infrastructure works (bridges, tunnels, etc.), to commercial or industrial buildings, and to public buildings such as prisons, schools and hospitals, MMC became particularly associated in the UK with construction of residential housing. However, several specialist housing businesses established to target this market did not become commercially viable.

== History ==
The MMC term started to enter common industry use in the early 2000s following the publication of the Egan Report, Rethinking Construction, in November 1998. An industry task force chaired by Sir John Egan, produced an influential report on the UK construction industry, which did much to drive efficiency improvements in UK construction industry practice during the early years of the 21st century, with its recommendations implemented through initiatives including the Movement for Innovation (M4I) and the Construction Best Practice Programme. However, the emergence of some non-traditional methods substantially predated Egan's report; procurement of prefabricated homes, for example, was a UK government response to housing shortages after both World Wars, the CLASP created prefabricated schools in the late 1950s, and the 1964-1970 Labour government engaged in an "Industrialised Building Drive".

MMC has been repeatedly advocated in UK government construction strategy statements including the 2017 Transforming Infrastructure Performance from the Infrastructure and Projects Authority (IPA), the 2019 Construction Sector Deal, the Construction Playbook (2020, 2022), and the IPA's 2021 TIP Roadmap to 2030. The 2022 Playbook and TIP Roadmap also encouraged procurement of construction projects based on product 'platforms' ("Platform Design for Manufacture and Assembly, PDfMA") comprising kits of parts, production processes, knowledge, people and relationships required to deliver all or part of construction projects. A separate publication, the Product Platform Rulebook, published in 2022 by the Construction Innovation Hub and co-authored by Akerlof Ltd, Mott MacDonald and AtkinsRéalis, outlined stratagies to deliver a platform-based approach.

MMC processes have also been advocated to address major redevelopment programmes. For example, the UK's New Hospital Programme, originally established in 2019 and reset in 2025, aimed to help the National Health Service remediate reinforced autoclaved aerated concrete problems at seven major hospitals (in Wave 1 during the late 2020s), followed by multiple hospitals in two further five-year waves through to 2039. Similarly, the Ministry of Justice instigated a £2.9bn MMC programme to provide 20,000 modernised prison places using DfMA approaches to manufacture standardised components like concrete walls and pre-assembled pipework systems off-site.

=== MMC for housing ===
The UK Government also invested in MMC housing initiatives and businesses. During the 2010s, as government backing (including via Homes England) for MMC grew, several UK companies (for example, Ilke Homes, L&G Modular Homes, House by Urban Splash, Modulous, Lighthouse and TopHat) were established to develop modular homes as an alternative to traditionally-built residences. From its Knaresborough, Yorkshire factory (opened in 2018, closed in 2023), Ilke Homes delivered two- and three-bedroom 'modular' homes that could be erected in 36 hours. Homes England invested £30m in Ilke Homes in November 2019, and a further £30m in September 2021. Despite a further fund-raising round, raising £100m in December 2022, Ilke Homes went into administration on 30 June 2023, with most of the company's 1,150 staff made redundant, and creditors owed £320m, including £68m owed to Homes England. L&G Modular Homes halted production in May 2023, blaming planning delays and the COVID-19 pandemic for its failure, with the enterprise incurring total losses over seven years of £295m.

In November 2023, Homes England loaned £15m to TopHat, another loss-making MMC housebuilder, to fund construction of a factory in Corby; in March 2024, the factory's opening was postponed and the company announced 70 redundancies. MD Andrew Shepherd left TopHat in May 2024. In August 2024, TopHat faced a winding-up hearing after a petition was filed by Harworth, a Yorkshire based property developer, but settled out of court. Also in August 2024, housebuilder Persimmon wrote off a £25m investment in TopHat it made in 2023, due to "a re-assessment of risks within the modular build sector". In October 2024, having accumulated a loss of around £87m since 2016, TopHat confirmed it was winding down its Derby factory operations, with most staff being made redundant. In its penultimate year of trading, TopHat made an operating loss of £46m on turnover of less than £11m.

In January 2024, following the high-profile failures of Ilke Homes, L&G Modular and House by Urban Splash during 2022 and 2023, the House of Lords Built Environment Committee highlighted that the UK Government needed to take a more coherent approach to addressing barriers affecting adoption of MMC: "If the Government wants the sector to be a success, it needs to take a step back, acquire a better understanding of how it works and the help that it needs, set achievable goals and develop a coherent strategy." Modulous and Lighthouse went into administration in January and March 2024 respectively. In late March 2024, housing minister Lee Rowley told the Lords Committee that the government would be reviewing its MMC policies in light of the crisis in the volumetric house-building sector. He promised "a full update in late spring once we have undertaken further detailed work with the sector". Following the July 2024 general election, a House of Lords Library report was published in August 2024 ahead of a scheduled debate in September 2024; it said the new Labour government would publish a new long-term housing strategy "in the coming months".

== Defining MMC ==
MMC refers to a variety of off-site construction methods:

- modular construction: three-dimensional units produced in a factory are transported to site and assembled and connected
- non-structural pods: for example, fitted kitchens or bathrooms that can be incorporated into load-bearing structures
- panelised systems: flat panel units typically used for walls, ceilings and floors, and made of timber, light steel or concrete, and
- sub-assemblies and components such as roof frames and floor cassettes.

During the early 2000s, the Housing Corporation classified a number of offsite manufacturing initiatives. Its classification included volumetric construction (e.g. bathroom and kitchen pods), panellised construction systems, hybrid construction (volumetric units integrated with panellised systems), sub-assemblies and components (e.g. floor and roof cassettes, wiring looms, pre-fabricated plumbing), and site-based MMC approaches.

In 2017, the IPA's Transforming Infrastructure Performance committed the government to "smart construction, using modern methods, including offsite manufacture". It said: "Smart construction (or 'modern methods of construction') offers the opportunity to transition from traditional construction to manufacturing, and unlock the benefits from standard, repeatable processes with components manufactured offsite."

=== MMC framework ===
Recognising that terms such as MMC, prefabrication and off-site construction were prone to different interpretations, a Modern Methods of Construction working group was established by the UK's Ministry for Housing, Communities and Local Government (MHCLG) to develop a definition framework. With inputs from Build Offsite, Homes England, National House Building Council (NHBC) and Royal Institution of Chartered Surveyors (RICS), the Modern Methods of Construction (MMC) framework definition was published in 2019. It was intended to regularise and refine the term MMC by defining the broad spectrum of innovative construction techniques being applied, enabling clients, advisors, lenders and investors, warranty providers, building insurers and valuers to all build a common understanding of the different forms of MMC use. It divides factory-produced systems into seven categories:

Modern Methods of Construction (MMC) framework
Category	Title	Explanation
1	Pre-Manufacturing – 3D primary structural systems	"The creation of 3D volumes – boxes effectively – away from site which are then combined on site to create a building."
2	Pre-Manufacturing – 2D primary structural systems	"The creation of 2D panelised and framing systems away from site that are assembled on site to create the structure of a building."
3	Pre-Manufacturing – Non-systemised structural components	"The use of pre-manufactured components to form part of the structure of a building."
4	Pre-Manufacturing – Additive manufacturing	"3D printing of components or whole elements of buildings."
5	Pre-Manufacturing – Non-structural assemblies and sub-assemblies	"The use of pre-assembled components that do not form the structure of the building but which consolidate materials and processes that otherwise would be delivered on site."
6	Traditional building product led to site labour reduction/productivity improvements	"The evolution of traditional building materials so that they are quicker, easier and safer to install."
7	Site process led to labour reduction/productivity improvements	"The use of systems and processes on-site to drive productivity by removing unnecessary workstages, enabling better and faster installation and improving health and safety."

Another approach to defining and measuring use of MMC was proposed by Mark Farmer in the 2016 Farmer Review. The term Pre-Manufactured Value (PMV) identifies the percentage of a construction project's value which is manufactured before installation at the final workface. This measure has been adopted by parts of the UK Government in an attempt to influence use of MMC on public sector funded projects.

== Criticisms ==
As previously mentioned, while MMC suggests a modern approach, some of its processes - notably prefabrication, but also standardisation of components - were extensively deployed during the 20th century. MMC, particularly in the UK, has been challenging to implement due to the volatility of the UK housing market, while the increasingly globalised nature of the supply chain for products such as panelised cladding systems also creates issues - for example, concerns about working conditions in remote off-site factories, and the de-skilling impacts on traditional capabilities in local communities. Moreover, re-classifying activities as manufacturing rather than construction would also materially impact the headline labour productivity of the construction sector. Also "Off-site factories are essentially transient entities. There is hence no guarantee they will be able to supply replacement components in the future. And the more that manufactured components rely on 'high-precision engineering' the less malleable they are in terms of future adaptation."

After high-profile business failures in the sector (including Ilke Homes), a 2024 study proposed steps to improve public perceptions of MMC and increase industry adoption. Confidence had also been adversely affected by the disjointed nature of MMC organisations, poor communication defining MMC, and unfair value comparisons. The study made a series of recommendations, including standardisation of systems, development of an MMC glossary and rethinking planning policies.
