= Northstowe Secondary College =

Location
- Stirling Road; Northstowe; Cambridgeshire, CB24 1DJ; England; 52.2806°N 0.068°E

Information
- Type: Academy
- Established: 2019
- Local authority: Cambridgeshire County Council
- Trust: Cambridge Meridian Academies Trust
- Department for Education URN: 148128 Tables
- Ofsted: Reports
- Headteacher: Dr Clare mills
- Gender: Co-educational
- Age: 11 to 18
- Houses: Attenborough, Dyson, Glennie and Parks
- Website: www.northstowesc.org

Northstowe Secondary College is a co-educational secondary school and sixth form located in Northstowe in the English county of Cambridgeshire.

The school was established in 2019 as part of the 'Northstowe Education Campus' which is being developed by Cambridgeshire County Council, South Cambridgeshire District Council and Homes England. The campus will also ultimately include a primary school, a special school and a sixth form centre.

Northstowe Secondary College is an academy sponsored by Cambridge Meridian Academies Trust. The school offers GCSEs and BTECs as programmes of study for pupils, and is also expected to ultimately offer a sixth form provision.

== Houses ==
Northstowe Secondary College Houses
House	Colour	Named After
Attenborough	Green	Sir David Attenborough
Dyson	Red	Sir James Dyson
Glennie	Orange	Dame Evelyn Glennie
Parks	Teal	Rosa parks
