= Ilke Homes =

Defunct UK housebuilder

Ilke Homes Limited
- Type: private
- Industry: House-building
- Founded: 2017; 9 years ago
- Defunct: October 2023
- Fate: Liquidation
- Headquarters: Knaresborough, Yorkshire, United Kingdom
- Number of employees: 1,150
- Website: https://ilkehomes.co.uk/

Ilke Homes (also written as ilke Homes) was a UK housebuilder specialising in modular homes for both social housing and for open market sale and private rental. Established in 2017, it went into administration in June 2023, owing £320 million and making over 1,100 workers redundant.

Its intellectual property was acquired and an updated 'Ilke Homes' website was launched in March 2024.

== History ==
Looking to capitalise upon growing UK interest in non-traditional housebuilding techniques and 'modern methods of construction' (MMC), Ilke Homes was established in August 2017 by housing contractor Keepmoat and offsite specialist Elliott Group, with financial backing by investor TDR Capital. Its first fully-finished homes, manufactured in Carnaby in East Yorkshire, were erected in east London, with the firm expecting to scale up to meet demand by opening a second 500-home a year assembly plant within a year. In 2018, in a test project backed by the UK government body Homes England and by development partner Engie, it supplied homes that could be installed in just one day at Gateshead Innovation Village to housing provider Home Group.

In May 2019, in a £100m deal, developer Places for People ordered 750 factory-built homes from Ilke Homes, and in November 2019, Homes England injected £30m into the business to boost production at the firm's primary production facility at Flaxby near Knaresborough, opened by Communities Secretary James Brokenshire in December 2018, allowing it to scale up capacity from 2,000 to 5,000 homes a year, potentially making Ilke a top 10 UK house builder.

However, the up-front costs of establishing its manufacturing facilities meant Ilke homes was already losing money: it reported a pre-tax loss of £7.7m in the year to 31 March 2018 on a turnover of £260,000, and a further pre-tax loss of £22.3m for the year to 31 March 2019 on a turnover of £2.6m. The company was also affected by an industry slow-down caused by the COVID-19 pandemic, and in June 2020 was forced into making redundancies affecting around a sixth of its then 600-strong workforce.

Nonetheless, developers showed continued faith in the firm. In 2020, it partnered with Vistry Partnerships to deliver 32 homes in Bristol, with Crea8ive Sustainable Homes to deliver 76 sustainable homes in Evesham, and with Anderson Group to deliver 227 homes in Grantham. In 2021, it secured a £44m deal for a development in Stanford-le-Hope, Essex, and was selected to deliver a 622-home development for Boots in Nottingham. In September 2021, Ilke announced it had raised £60m in funding, including another £30m from Homes England, with the balance coming from new and existing investors including TDR Capital, £10m from the Guinness Partnership, plus investments from Middleton Enterprises and private equity firm Sun Capital.

In January 2022, the company announced further losses. Staff overheads and ongoing start-up costs and COVID-19 effects meant Ilke suffered a £41m loss in the year to March 2021, on sales of just £28m - and total losses over four years of £107m. It claimed a contracted order book of over £300m and a total pipeline of over 3,000 homes. It won a deal with Bellway Homes to supply 40 factory-built houses in Milton Keynes, and was contracted to deliver 221 affordable homes in Southend-on-Sea in Essex for The Guinness Partnership.

In December 2022, Ilke Homes announced a £100m fund-raising round, supported by new and existing shareholders. US-based Fortress led the equity investment, to which TDR Capital and Sun Capital also subscribed. The new funding was intended to help Ilke Homes scale-up, opening a new factory to increase output capacity to 4,000 homes a year, creating over 1,000 new jobs.

=== Financial difficulties and administration ===
However, seven months later in June 2023, site and manufacturing operations at the company's 250,000 sq ft factory were suspended, and the business was put up for sale. Directors said the business had struggled against volatile macro-economic conditions, issues with the planning system, and complicated fundraising and housing delivery. Investors were reportedly concerned over the rate of cash burn; industry insiders attributed Ilke Homes' problems to a reliance on venture capital, the financial burden of a large factory, market factors (COVID-19, the Russian invasion of Ukraine, rising inflation), lack of government support, local authority planning processes, and uncertainty about the innovative products.

Ilke backers approached major house builders including Barratt, Bellway and Taylor Wimpey in an effort to attract further investment into the business, but, despite 15 interested parties, with no bidders surfacing the company announced its intention to appoint administrators. (It later emerged that a £25m rescue bid had been made on 18 June, but was withdrawn on 23 June.) The company went into administration on 30 June 2023, with most of the company's 1,150 staff made redundant, and creditors owed £320m. Ilke Homes' R&D director Nigel Banks said it was "a very sad day," adding "We completed over 40 sites in 5 years and have created great homes and communities for hundreds of families. Sadly today, our plane has run out of fuel... and it is landing with a crash that will impact many people inside and outside the business. I am truly sorry that this has happened."

In August 2023, the collapsed company owed £249m to unsecured creditors (mostly inter-company debts suffered by equity investors), £17m to subcontractors and suppliers, £2m to tax authorities and £68m to Homes England. Sister company Ilke Homes Land also collapsed and owed £14m to subcontractors and suppliers and £21m in inter-company debts. Ilke Homes had just £26,000 in the bank when it went under. Trade and other creditors owed over £300,000 included North Yorkshire County Council, Jewson and City Electrical Factors; Duftons Plumbing & Heating Suppliers and window supplier Euramax were both owed over £0.5m; National timber group was owed £892,000, Modular Movements Ltd was owed £1m, Modular Plantrooms Ltd was owed £1.6m, while Wetherby Building Systems, a supplier of renders and external wall insulation, was owed more than £1.8m.

Homes England was set to lose most of the £68.8m it was owed by Ilke Homes. In January 2024, following the collapse of Ilke Homes and several other MMC companies (including L&G Modular Homes and House by Urban Splash) during 2022 and 2023, the House of Lords Built Environment Committee highlighted that the UK Government needed to take a more coherent and determined approach to addressing barriers affecting adoption of MMC: "If the Government wants the sector to be a success, it needs to take a step back, acquire a better understanding of how it works and the help that it needs, set achievable goals and develop a coherent strategy." Millions of pounds of public money had been invested, but had not been backed by a coherent strategy and set of measurable objectives ("Homes England has not given any clear metrics as to how success is to be measured and over what timescale.") In late March 2024, housing minister Lee Rowley told the Lords Committee that the government would be reviewing its MMC policies in light of the crisis in the volumetric house-building sector. He promised "a full update in late spring once we have undertaken further detailed work with the sector".

The Ilke Homes company was formally wound up in October 2023. In August 2024, administrators said Ilke's unsecured creditors would receive just £829,000 of the £63m they are owed (£34.9m owed by Ilke Homes Land, £23.9m owed by Ilke Homes Holding). Ilke owed Homes England £68.7m but the government housing agency would get back just £5m of its 2019 loan to company; this figure was revised downwards in November 2024 to £128,000. Homes England was the only creditor likely to receive any repayment; of creditors owed a combined total of £321m, most are expected to receive nothing.

In September 2024, over 130 half-built Ilke houses at Meadow Grange in Southend-on-Sea were to be part-demolished before construction could restart. In July 2026, Lovell Partnerships landed a £53m deal to rebuild the scheme.

== Homespace ==
In March 2024, a new company, operating from an email address in Ireland, began promoting Ilke Homes. The original company's website was updated and included a new brand, Homespace. The website said: "Homespace was born through the completion of a strategic asset purchase agreement, taking ownership of Ilke's trademarks, Design IP, Modular stock, and technology patents." Debtors complained "The website is full of Ilke projects boasting about their succcess – when Ilke actually went bust leaving debts all over the industry."
