= Housing Associations Act 1985 =

Act of the Parliament of the United Kingdom

Housing Associations Act 1985 (Note: Section 107(1).)
- Act of Parliament
- Parliament of the United Kingdom
- Long title: An Act to consolidate certain provisions of the Housing Acts relating to housing associations, with amendments to give effect to recommendations of the Law Commission and of the Scottish Law Commission.
- Citation: 1985 c. 69
- Territorial extent: England and Wales; Scotland; (Note: Section 107(3)–(5).)

Dates
- Royal assent: 30 October 1985
- Commencement: 1 April 1986 (Note: Section 107(2).)

Other legislation
- Amended by: List: Local Government (Wales) Act 1994; Police and Magistrates' Courts Act 1994; Local Government etc. (Scotland) Act 1994; Insurance Companies (Third Insurance Directives) Regulations 1994; Housing Associations (Permissible Additional Purposes) (England and Wales) Order 1994; Police Act 1996; Family Law Act 1996; Housing Act 1996; Housing Associations (Permissible Additional Purposes) (England and Wales) Order 1996; Housing Act 1996 (Consequential Provisions) Order 1996; Police Act 1997; Government of Wales Act 1998; Local Government Act 1999; Greater London Authority Act 1999; Abolition of Feudal Tenure etc. (Scotland) Act 2000; Government Resources and Accounts Act 2000 (Audit of Public Bodies) Order 2003; Public Audit (Wales) Act 2004; Civil Partnership Act 2004; Housing Act 2004; Housing Corporation (Delegation) etc. Act 2006; Charities Act 2006; Local Government and Public Involvement in Health Act 2007; Housing and Regeneration Act 2008; Companies Act 2006 (Consequential Amendments etc) Order 2008; Housing and Regeneration Act 2008 (Consequential Provisions) Order 2008; Local Democracy, Economic Development and Construction Act 2009; Housing Corporation (Dissolution) Order 2009; Companies Act 2006 (Consequential Amendments, Transitional Provisions and Savings) Order 2009; Bribery Act 2010; Housing and Regeneration Act 2008 (Consequential Provisions) Order 2010; Police Reform and Social Responsibility Act 2011; Charities Act 2011; Treaty of Lisbon (Changes in Terminology) Order 2011; Charities (Pre-consolidation Amendments) Order 2011; Land Registration etc. (Scotland) Act 2012; Housing (Scotland) Act 2010 (Consequential Modifications) Order 2012; Housing (Scotland) Act 2010 (Consequential Provisions and Modifications) Order 2012; Financial Services Act 2012 (Mutual Societies) Order 2013; Local Audit and Accountability Act 2014; Co-operative and Community Benefit Societies Act 2014; Enterprise and Regulatory Reform Act 2013 (Consequential Amendments) (Bankruptcy) and the Small Business, Enterprise and Employment Act 2015 (Consequential Amendments) Regulations 2016; Policing and Crime Act 2017; Public Bodies (Abolition of Public Works Loan Commissioners) Order 2020; Renting Homes (Wales) Act 2016 (Consequential Amendments) Regulations 2022; Levelling-up and Regeneration Act 2023
- Relates to: Housing Act 1985; Landlord and Tenant Act 1985; Housing (Consequential Provisions) Act 1985

Status: Partially repealed

Text of statute as originally enacted

Revised text of statute as amended

Text of the Housing Associations Act 1985 as in force today (including any amendments) within the United Kingdom, from legislation.gov.uk.

The Housing Associations Act 1985 (c. 69) is an act of the Parliament of the United Kingdom that consolidated enactments relating to housing associations in England and Wales and Scotland.
