= Oakington Immigration Reception Centre =

Closed centre for housing immigrants to the UK

Coordinates: 52.273508°N 0.065715°E

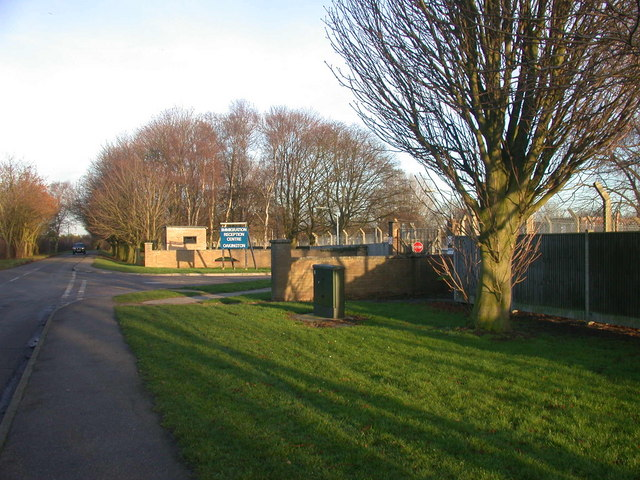
Entrance to Oakington Immigration Reception Centre

Oakington Immigration Reception Centre was an immigration detention centre located in Cambridgeshire run by UK Visas and Immigration.

Originally a World War II airfield, RAF Oakington was used by RAF Bomber Command flying Short Stirling aircraft. The base contracted after the war, and much evidence of its former presence is visible in farmland surrounding the current perimeter. It was used for flight training until the 1970s, and then became a barracks.

Taken over by the Home Office, it was converted to an immigration centre; in 2000 the site held and processed around 450 political asylum seekers, and between opening and mid-2005 had processed over 40,000 people who had been arrested for entering the country illegally. The site was then operated the, then, UK Border Agency's seven-day fast-track assessment process, which involved a series of interviews over an average of 14 days to determine the validity of a case. If refused asylum, detainees were removed from the country. If they gained asylum, they were released into the community.

The centre received repeated criticisms from the prisons inspector and from others regarding safety of children and adults detained there. In January 2008, it was announced that the centre was the second worst in the country.

The site was acquired in March 2006 by English Partnerships for a new town called Northstowe. The centre was due to close in 2006 but actually closed in November 2010.
