= Sustainable Communities Plan =

2003 policy in England

The Sustainable Communities Plan was launched in 2003 and was a key policy of the Office of the Deputy Prime Minister in the Labour Government, guiding its regeneration and departmental objectives. It led to a range of policies and plans which were in effect a spatial plan for the whole of England. The plan interacted with a number of flagship regeneration policies such as The Northern Way, Thames Gateway and the Academy for Sustainable Communities.

== Definition ==
The government defined a sustainable community as:

Sustainable communities are places where people want to live and work, now and in the future. They meet the diverse needs of existing and future residents, are sensitive to their environment, and contribute to a high quality of life. They are safe and inclusive, well planned, built and run, and offer equality of opportunity and good services for all.

Amongst other policies the Sustainable Communities Plan aimed to regenerate the industrial urban belt in northern England, stretching from Hull to Liverpool and provide hundreds of thousands of homes in South East England centred on the key growth areas of the Thames Gateway, around Luton and Milton Keynes, Ashford (Kent), and the wider area around Cambridge.

The Sustainable Communities Plan was finally revoked almost 12 years later by the Conservative Secretary of State for Communities and Local Government, Eric Pickles MP, on 16 January 2015.

== See also ==
- Millennium Communities Programme
- Expansion plans for Milton Keynes
