= Housing and Regeneration Act 2008 =

Act of the Parliament of the United Kingdom

Housing and Regeneration Act 2008 (Note: Section 326.)
- Act of Parliament
- Parliament of the United Kingdom
- Long title: An Act to establish the Homes and Communities Agency and make provision about it; to abolish the Urban Regeneration Agency and the Commission for the New Towns and make provision in connection with their abolition; to regulate social housing; to enable the abolition of the Housing Corporation; to make provision about sustainability certificates, landlord and tenant matters, building regulations and mobile homes; to make further provision about housing; and for connected purposes.
- Citation: 2008 c. 17
- Introduced by: Hazel Blears; Secretary of State for Communities and Local Government (Commons)
- Territorial extent: England and Wales (Note: Section 324.)

Dates
- Royal assent: 22 July 2008
- Commencement: Various (Note: Section 325.)
Other legislation
Amends	House of Commons Disqualification Act 1975; Rent Act 1977; Protection from Eviction Act 1977; Inheritance Tax Act 1984; New Towns and Urban Development Corporations Act 1985; Housing Associations Act 1985; Town and Country Planning Act 1990; Planning (Listed Buildings and Conservation Areas) Act 1990; Planning (Hazardous Substances) Act 1990; Water Industry Act 1991; Water Resources Act 1991; Social Security Administration Act 1992; Immigration and Asylum Act 1999; Public Audit (Wales) Act 2004; Tribunals, Courts and Enforcement Act 2007; Criminal Justice and Immigration Act 2008
Amended by	Charities Act 2011\Co-operative and Community Benefit Societies Act 2014; Infrastructure Act 2015; Digital Economy Act 2017; Corporate Insolvency and Governance Act 2020; Social Housing (Regulation) Act 2023; Renters' Rights Act 2025

Status: Amended

History of passage through Parliament

Text of statute as originally enacted

Revised text of statute as amended

The Housing and Regeneration Act 2008 (c. 17) is an act of the Parliament of the United Kingdom.

== Background ==
The legislation formed part of the government's policy to build 3,000,000 new homes before 2020.

== Provisions ==
The act separated the funding and regulation functions which had been previously combined within the Housing Corporation.

The act established the Homes and Community Agency, as a merger of English Partnerships and the Housing Corporation.

The act allowed for for-profit social housing providers to be established.

=== Section 325 – Commencement ===
Orders made under section 325(1)

- The Housing and Regeneration Act 2008 (Commencement No. 1 and Transitional Provision) Order 2008 (SI 2008/2358 (C.103))
- The Housing and Regeneration Act 2008 (Commencement No. 2 and Transitional, Saving and Transitory Provisions) Order 2008 (SI 2008/3068 (C.132))
- The Housing and Regeneration Act 2008 (Commencement No. 3) Order 2009 (SI 2009/363 (C.18))
- The Housing and Regeneration Act 2008 (Commencement No. 4 and Transitory Provisions) Order 2009 (SI 2009/803 (C.52))
- The Housing and Regeneration Act 2008 (Commencement No. 5) Order 2009 (SI 2009/1261 (C.66))
- The Housing and Regeneration Act 2008 (Commencement No.6 and Transitional and Savings Provisions) Order 2009 (SI 2009/2096 (C.93))
- The Housing and Regeneration Act 2008 (Commencement No. 7 and Transitional and Saving Provisions) Order 2010 (SI 2010/862 (C.57))
- The Housing and Regeneration Act 2008 (Commencement No. 8 and Transitional, Transitory and Saving Provisions) Order 2011 (SI 2011/1002 (C.40))
- The Housing and Regeneration Act 2008 (Commencement No. 1 and Saving Provisions) Order 2009 (SI 2009/415 (C.28))
- The Housing and Regeneration Act 2008 (Commencement No. 1) (Wales) Order 2009 (SI 2009/773 (W.65) (C.48))
- The Housing and Regeneration Act 2008 (Commencement No. 2) (Wales) Order 2011 (SI 2011/1863 (W.201) (C.68))
