= Industrialization of construction =

The industrialization of construction is the process through which construction aims to improve productivity through increased mechanization and automation. The process commonly involves modularization, prefabrication, preassembly, and mass production.

== Background ==
Traditionally, construction has made use of manual labor such as tradesmen and subcontractors for tasks such as the installation of prefabricated elements. In the industrialization phase, construction uses manufacturing processes and technology to perform off-site prefabrication, assembling building components off-site rather than at the point of installation. Pre-assembled components are then sent to the building site in modular units. This type of prefabrication done away from the construction site is often referred to as externalizing work.

The industrialization of construction also implements principles such as the Toyota Production System and agile construction for developing work information systems. These systems and information technology such as the Internet of Things (IoT) create real-time feedback loops for improved decision making.

Scholars name five stages for the industrialization of construction: management of labor, management of work, lean operations, modeling and simulation, and feedback of the source based on the study of industrialization in other industries.

Lean industrial construction provides a framework to shift the construction industry from fragmented design processes to data-driven digital designs, and from one-off projects to standardized, sustainable buildings.

== Effects ==
Productivity in the construction industry has been far behind productivity in general manufacturing, due to the increased industrialization in general manufacturing and construction's continued reliance on field labor. The main aim of industrialized construction is to increase productivity and reduce costs and project time through mechanization. Industrialization makes production processes and methods more efficient and reduces loss of working hours due to adverse weather conditions.

The industrialization of construction can have positive or negative effects on subcontractors and construction workers based on how well they are able to adapt to off-site working opportunities. Increased mechanization may result in a shift from price to performance competition for contractors.

== See also ==
- Modern methods of construction (MMC)
