= Housing Corporation (Delegation) etc. Act 2006 =

Act of the Parliament of the United Kingdom

Housing Corporation (Delegation) etc. Act 2006 (Note: Section 2(1).)
- Act of Parliament
- Parliament of the United Kingdom
- Long title: An Act to make provision about the delegation of functions by the Housing Corporation and Housing for Wales and about the validation of things done or evidenced by, and the authentication of the fixing of, their seals.
- Citation: 2006 c. 27
- Territorial extent: England and Wales; Scotland (Note: Section 2(2).)

Dates
- Royal assent: 19 July 2006
- Commencement: 19 July 2006 (Note: Section 4(b) of the Interpretation Act 1978.)
Other legislation
| Amends | Housing Associations Act 1985 |
| Amended by | Housing Corporation (Dissolution) Order 2009 |

Status: Amended

History of passage through Parliament

Text of statute as originally enacted

Revised text of statute as amended

The Housing Corporation (Delegation) etc. Act 2006 (c. 27) is an act of the Parliament of the United Kingdom.

== Background ==
The act was enacted because it was discovered that the Housing Corporation had been delegating its statutory functions without lawful authority for 40 years. Its purpose was to retroactively legalise this.

== Provisions ==
The act gives the Housing Corporation a power of delegation either to staff or a committee of the board with retrospective effect. The Housing Corporation is also deemed to have always had this power.

=== Section 1 - Power of Housing Corporation to delegate functions etc. ===
Section 1(1) inserted paragraph 6A of schedule 6 to the Housing Associations Act 1985. It was repealed for England and Wales on 1 April 2009.

== See also ==
- Delegatus non potest delegare
- Ex post facto law
