= Newtown Common =

Village in Hampshire, England

Coordinates: 51.365886°N 1.32634°W

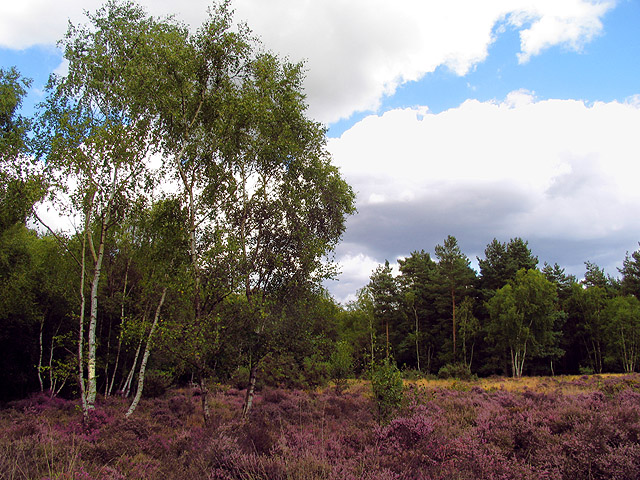
- Heather field near Newtown Common

- Location within Hampshire
- Population: 382
- OS grid reference: SU4699563195
- District: Basingstoke and Deane
- Shire county: Hampshire
- Region: South East
- Country: England
- Sovereign state: United Kingdom
- Post town: NEWBURY
- Postcode district: RG20
- Dialling code: 01635
- Police: Hampshire and Isle of Wight
- Fire: Hampshire and Isle of Wight
- Ambulance: South Central
- UK Parliament: North West Hampshire

Newtown Common is a village in the Basingstoke and Deane district of Hampshire, England. Its nearest town is Newbury, which lies approximately 2.5 miles (4.1 km) north-east from the village.

== History ==
The Feudal title Lord of the Manor of Newtown was sold at auction in 1986 for £4,200 by the Earl of Carnarvon to local businessman Michael Farrow. Using the title, Farrow claimed the common and registered it with the Land Registry. He then transferred it to Bakewell Management, who requested a fee of 6% of the property value from all of the homeowners who used the common to access their property. Initially successful, the request for money to cross the ransom strip was overturned by the House of Lords on 1 April 2004.

== Governance ==
Newtown Common is part of the civil parish of Newtown, and is part of the Burghclere, Highclere and St. Mary Bourne ward of Basingstoke and Deane borough council. The borough council is a Non-metropolitan district of Hampshire County Council.
