= Tenant Services Authority =

British regulatory body

The Tenant Services Authority (TSA) was the operating name of the Office for Tenants and Social Landlords, the former regulatory agency of registered providers of social housing in England.

On 1 December 2008 the TSA first took over the regulatory work of the Housing Corporation, inspecting housing associations and responding to concerns. Its remit was then expanded to regulate local authority housing, ALMOs and housing cooperatives from April 2010, almost 1,800 providers.

The TSA closed after the Homes and Communities Agency (HCA) took over responsibility for the regulation of social housing from 1 April 2012.

== Background ==
In 2007, Professor Martin Cave, Director of the Centre for Management under Regulation at University of Warwick, led the most comprehensive review of English housing regulation for 30 years. Reporting in June, the Cave Review recommended that a new regulator be set up, separating the regulation and investment responsibilities of the Housing Corporation.

After consultation with the sector, Housing Minister Yvette Cooper announced the Government's decision and the name of the new regulator as "Office for Tenants and Social Landlords" on 15 October 2007. Its operating name was subsequently announced as the Tenant Services Authority.

The TSA was established by section 81 of the Housing and Regeneration Act 2008. The same Act created the Homes and Communities Agency to take over the investment powers of the Housing Corporation. Both became operational on 1 December 2008.

The equivalent powers in Scotland and Wales are held by the Scottish Housing Regulator and the Welsh Assembly Government.

== Management ==
The TSA's chief executive, Peter Marsh, was the former deputy chief executive of the Housing Corporation. Most of the other directors were from outside the corporation.

== Approach to regulation ==
The TSA had more extensive powers than its predecessor, and emphasised its role as "a champion for tenants". Throughout 2009 it undertook a "National Conversation" with residents and other interested parties on how it should exercise these powers.

In March 2010 the TSA published a new framework of six national standards which would apply to all social landlords in England. The standards were based on outcomes for tenants rather than processes. A new approach of "co-regulation" meant that landlords would work with tenants to regulate themselves. The TSA would end routine inspections of all providers. Where landlords were not meeting the standards, the TSA would hold discussions with them before using its powers of formal intervention.

== Closure ==
After the 2010 general election, the Conservative housing minister Grant Shapps indicated his intention to close the TSA. Its responsibilities for governance and financial regulation of housing associations passed to the HCA, but the Housing Ombudsman became the final point of appeal for tenants' complaints.

In September 2010, the HCA was also included on a list of organisations being considered for closure. However, Shapps announced in October that the TSA would be merged into the HCA.

Legislative provisions for abolishing the TSA and the transferring of its functions were enacted as part of the Localism Act 2011. These provisions were formally commenced on 1 April 2012.
