= Regional Improvement and Efficiency Partnership =

The nine Regional Improvement and Efficiency Partnerships were English public sector organisations that work to support councils and their partners to become more efficient, innovative and engaged with citizens. Unlike some other improvement bodies the RIEPs are notable for having strong governance from networks of councils within each region, this recognises that the local government sector is best placed to lead its own improvement and ensures that the RIEP offer targets the defined needs of the sector. The RIEPs aimed to bring additional skills to local government, to promote improvement and efficiency.

== History ==
The nine RIEPs were created in April 2008 with a three-year funding package of £185 million from Communities and Local Government. The RIEPs were established following the December 2007 National Improvement and Efficiency Strategy for Local Government, which was produced jointly by the Local Government Group (then called the Local Government Association) and Communities and Local Government. The strategy acknowledged that improvement architecture needed to be better coordinated and closer to the front line in order to be more effective. The RIEPs, made up of networks of councils, were the vehicle for delivering this through using their devolved funding, spreading knowledge and good practice and navigating councils through the maze of improvement support. The RIEPs' three-year funded programme finished at the end of March 2011 and the government did not commit additional funding to support them.

The RIEPs' core functions included:

- acting as a hub to coordinate and focus resources on supporting councils and partners to deliver excellent local area agreement (LAA) outcomes
- supporting improvement and help local authorities to accelerate and add to their efficiency savings
- supporting councils in their response to the economic downturn
- identifying and share good practice and stimulate innovation
- establishing partnerships and networks to address performance issues.

In general the RIEPs focussed on critical areas where improving efficiency and performance has the largest impact. Many of the biggest savings have been made in procurement through facilitating consortia and developing improved frameworks, usually housed in procurement hubs, and by using other mechanisms to reduce prices, for example by developing fair pricing tools or setting up eAuctions. RIEPs also worked to drive cashable efficiencies in business transformation and shared services. RIEPs supported transformation projects and invested in providing training to ensure skills remained in the sector. The Local Productivity Programme mapped over 200 examples of shared services, many of which were supported by the RIEPs. Most of the RIEPs have also run successful programmes supporting improvements in children's services, adult social care and economic regeneration.

They worked with national bodies such as Local Government Improvement and Development (formerly the Improvement and Development Agency) as well as government offices (GOs) and inspectorates. This aimed to ensure that resources were dedicated to prevention and support, particularly peer support, thereby avoiding government intervention.

They also worked with LG Group to develop the Local Productivity Programme, helping to define and shape the programme and contributing over 30 (of 100) productivity opportunities that councils could use to increase their productivity.

Together the nine RIEPs had saved almost £1bn by April 2011 from an initial outlay of £185m. Over the same period the Audit Commission also found that council performance improved markedly with very few councils being assessed as under performing. The RIEPs have had an important role in supporting councils and partners to work together to purchase collaboratively, share services and to take a multi-agency "Total Place" approach to tackling serious problems.
