= Academy for Sustainable Communities =

The Academy for Sustainable Communities (ASC) is a national skills initiative that has been set up by the Department of Communities and Local Government.

In April 2004, Sir John Egan, a leading industrialist and past president of the Institute of Management, reported on the skills and training needed to deliver the Government's Sustainable Communities Plan. A key recommendation of the Egan Review was a national centre for sustainable communities skills and knowledge. In October 2005, it was announced that the ASC’s first chief executive would be Gill Taylor, formerly Chief Executive of Burnley Borough Council.

The ASC has since developed Sir John Egan’s vision and is focusing its work on three target audiences: young people; professionals; and communities. The ASC is working with partners to develop new learning resources such as a Sustainable Communities Foundation Degree, undertake major research studies, launch careers drives and promote good practice.

== See also ==
- Sustainability
- Sustainable communities
- Sustainable Communities Plan
