= RAF Oakington =

Former Royal Air Force station near Cambridge, England

RAF Oakington
- Near Oakington, Cambridgeshire in England

Site information
- Type: Royal Air Force Station
- Code: OA
- Owner: Ministry of Defence
- Operator: Royal Air Force; British Army
- Controlled by: RAF Bomber Command; Army Air Corps

Location
- Shown within Cambridgeshire RAF Oakington (the United Kingdom)
- Coordinates: 52°16′12″N 0°04′03″E

Site history
- Built: 1939
- In use: July 1940 - 2011
- Battles/wars: European theatre of World War II

Airfield information
- Elevation: 12 metres (39 ft) AMSL
Runways
Direction	Length and surface
05/23	6,121 feet (1,866 m) Concrete/Tarmac
10/28	4,609 feet (1,405 m) Concrete/Tarmac
01/19	4,615 feet (1,407 m) Concrete/Tarmac

Royal Air Force Oakington or more simply RAF Oakington is a former Royal Air Force station located 0.5 miles (0.80 km) north of Oakington, Cambridgeshire, England and 5.1 miles (8.2 km) northwest of Cambridge.

== History ==
=== Second World War ===
Construction was started in 1939, but was affected by the outbreak of war. The original plan called for Type-C hangars but two type J were erected instead. It was used by No. 2 Group in July 1940 for No. 218 Squadron which had recently returned from Nantes, France. In September, Oakington was passed to No. 2 Group which stationed the first Short Stirling Squadron No. 7.

The newly formed No. 3 Photographic Reconnaissance Unit RAF started to use RAF Oakington to conduct high altitude work for Bomber Command's target. However, there were poor surface conditions at RAF Oakington so No. 3 PRU often operated from RAF Alconbury.

=== Postwar ===
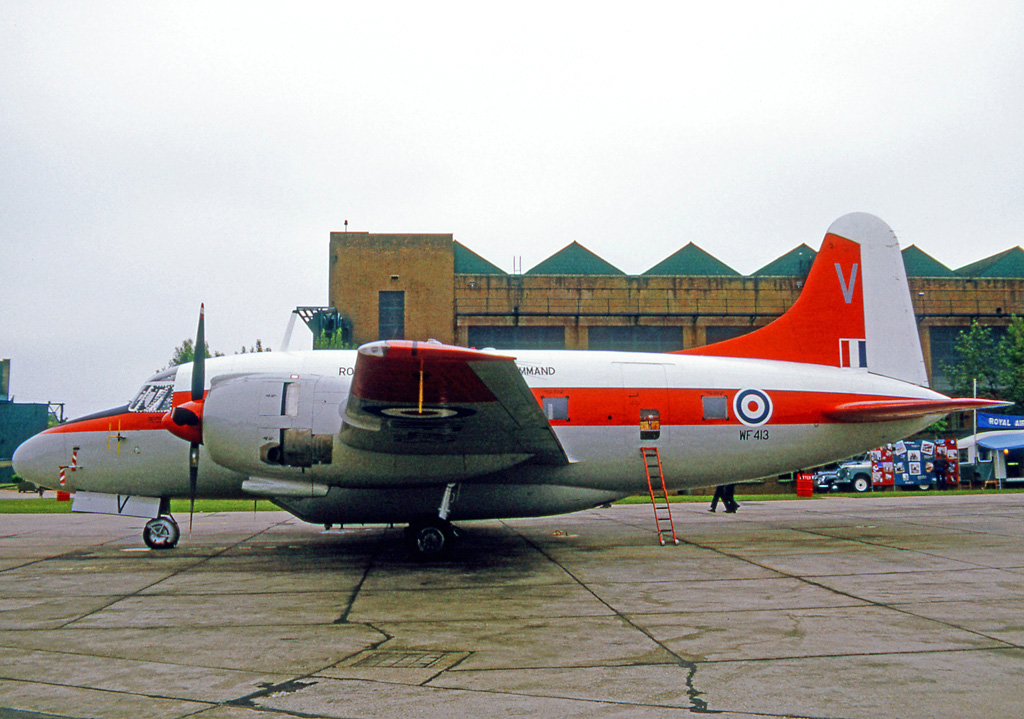
Vickers Varsity navigation trainer of No.5 FTS in 1971

During the 1950s RAF Oakington was an Advanced Flying Training School, No. 5 Flying Training School RAF (5 FTS), which reformed at the airfield on 1 June 1954. Its initial role was to convert trainee pilots to jets using de Havilland Vampire FB.5 single seat jets and T.11 twin-seat jets.

In March 1962 these types were exchanged for the Vickers Varsity T.1 twin piston-engine pilot trainers. 5 FTS was disbanded on 31 December 1974 when the need for training on piston engined aircraft reduced. The airfield was then closed, becoming a British Army barracks.

The airfield's land area had contracted after the war, and much evidence of this former military use is visible in farmland surrounding the current perimeter.

=== Units ===
The following units were here at some point:

- No. 1 Flying Training School RAF
- No. 3 Photographic Reconnaissance Unit RAF; Spitfires, November 1940 – July 1941
- No. 5 Flying Training School RAF
- No. 7 Conversion Flight RAF
- No. 7 Squadron RAF; Short Stirlings and Avro Lancasters, October 1940 – July 1945
- No. 10 Squadron RAF
- No. 18 Squadron RAF
- No. 23 Operational Training Unit RAF (23 OTU)
- No. 24 Squadron RAF
- No. 27 Squadron RAF
- No. 30 Squadron RAF
- No. 46 Squadron RAF
- No. 75 Squadron RAF
- No. 86 Squadron RAF
- No. 97 Squadron RAF
- No. 101 Conversion Flight RAF
- No. 101 Squadron RAF
- No. 206 Advanced Flying School RAF
- No. 206 Squadron RAF
- No. 218 Squadron RAF; Bristol Blenheims, July–November 1940
- No. 238 Squadron RAF
- No. 242 Squadron RAF
- No. 571 Squadron RAF
- No. 627 Squadron RAF
- No. 657 Squadron AAC
- No. 723 Defence Squadron
- No. 1409 Meteorological Flight RAF
- No. 3 Section of No. 1552 (Radio Aids Training) Flight RAF
- No. 1559 (Radio Aids Training) Flight RAF
- No. 2708 Squadron RAF Regiment
- No. 2723 Squadron RAF Regiment

=== British Army use ===
The barracks were used in the late 1970s and through the 1980s as a transit camp for units moving between Germany and Northern Ireland. It was also a permanent base for 657 Squadron Army Air Corps in the 1980s. The barracks were occupied by the 3rd Bn The Royal Green Jackets from 1979 to 1982.1st Bn The Royal Anglian Regiment from 1982 to 1984, the 1st Bn The Worcestershire and Sherwood Foresters Regiment (29th and 45th) from 1986 to 1989, Royal Highland Fusiliers from 1989 to 1993 and by the Cheshire Regiment from 1993 to 1996.

== Immigration Reception Centre ==
In 2000 the station domestic area was leased to the Home Office, and converted for use as Oakington Immigration Reception Centre until November 2010.

== Future use ==
Since 2007 plans have been developed to build Northstowe, a new settlement of 9,500 houses on the site. Demolition of parts of the site commenced in late January 2011 by the contractor Sovereign Plant Ltd. Work started on the first 1500 homes and related facilities in 2014.
