= Ransom strip =

Land obstructing access to a property from a public highway

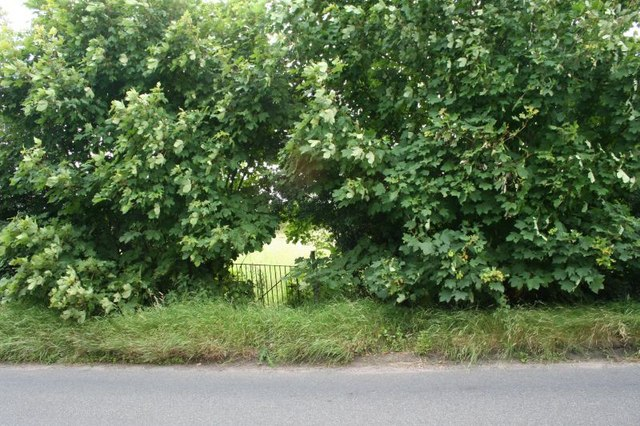
Small path with gate in Mongewell, Oxfordshire, now used as ransom strip

In the United Kingdom, a ransom strip is a parcel of land needed to access an adjacent property from a public highway, to which the owner is denied access until payment is received. The strip of land can be either between the property and the highway, or be located between two properties. The width of the ransom strip can be as narrow as 150 millimetres (5.9 in) wide, but it can lead to significant conflict.

The Royal Institution of Chartered Surveyors advises property owners to locate and price any ransom strip on a property, as the cost to release the "ransom" should be deducted from the overall purchase price of the property. The agreement to access such ransom strips is lodged with the Land Registry.

It may be possible to claim a prescriptive easement if there has been 20 years of uninterrupted access.

A ransom strip can also include permission to widen a public road leading to a property. In 1999, a 10-year dispute over a ransom strip in Riddlesden, West Yorkshire, resulted in a £1.6 million payment to a group of houseowners, who agreed to sell a 16-foot (4.9 m) tract of their properties to widen a road leading to a new development of 350 houses.

== Case law ==
The Law of Property Act 1925 (15 & 16 Geo. 5. c. 20) makes it a criminal offence to drive across common land without permission.

The 1961 case of Stokes v Cambridge determined that if a parcel of land would allow access to develop a neighbouring property, in a compulsory purchase of the land its owner is entitled to one-third of the resulting property value.

The 1925 law was cited in the case of businessman Michael Farrow, who in 1986 purchased the title Lord of the Manor of Newtown at auction for £4,200 from the Earl of Carnarvon. Farrow claimed Newtown Common and registered it with the Land Registry. He then transferred it to his company, Bakewell Management, which requested a fee of 6% of the property value from all of the residents who used the common to access their property. He was initially successful, although the courts cited the Countryside and Rights of Way Act 2000 to set at 2% of the value of their homes as the maximum amount that owners of ransom strips could charge homeowners. The House of Lords ultimately overturned Farrow's victory on 1 April 2004, deciding that the residents had satisfied the requirement of using the property continuously for 20 years.

== Railway context ==
The term 'ransom strip' is used in the rail transportation business if a train has to be equipped with safety systems from a monopoly supplier in order to travel on a short connecting line between two parts of a network that is equipped with standard systems.

== See also ==
- Easement
