= Institute for Sustainable Communities =

Institute for Sustainable Communities

The Institute for Sustainable Communities (ISC) is an independent, tax-exempt, nonprofit organization whose primary work includes finding community-based solutions to reducing climate pollution in the U.S. and China, building the capacity of civil society in the Balkans, and helping communities along the U.S. Gulf Coast and China recover from disasters. ISC provides training, technical assistance and financial support to communities, nonprofits/nongovernmental organizations, businesses and local governments.

Founded in 1991 by Madeleine Kunin and George Hamilton, ISC’s early work connected civic participation with environmental management in the countries of the former Soviet Union. ISC has since managed 99 projects in 30 countries, and is funded by private foundations, corporations, individuals and government agencies. Major current programs include the Guangdong Environmental partnership and U.S.-China Partnership for Climate Action in China, the Climate Leadership Academy and Gulf Coast Sustainable Communities Network in the U.S., the Civil Society Advocacy Initiative in Serbia, and the Civil Society Strengthening Program in Kosovo.

Based in Montpelier, Vermont, ISC has offices in Washington, DC, in China (Beijing), Bangladesh (Dhaka), and India (Mumbai). ISC works with local partners to design and implement projects that mobilize communities to bring clean air, water, and land to their communities; adopt energy efficiency measures and conserve resources; reduce the causes and adapt to the local effects of climate disruption; strengthen their civil society institutions to become influential partners alongside business and government; or rebuild sustainably after disasters.

ISC has founded and/or mentored organizations in the countries in which it has worked, including the Fund for Sustainable Development in Russia, the Successful Communities Institute in Ukraine, and FOCUS, a new grassroots organization based in Mississippi.

== ISC's Impact ==
The founding mission of ISC is to help communities around the world address environmental, economic, and social challenges to build a better future shaped and shared by all.

ISC has led community-driven projects across the globe. The organization's approach to addressing these challenges ensures solutions that emerge from within the communities they are working with, rather than being imposed from the outside. They combine technical expertise and leadership training with strategic investments in local organizations in order to create lasting change.
