= City Electrical Factors =

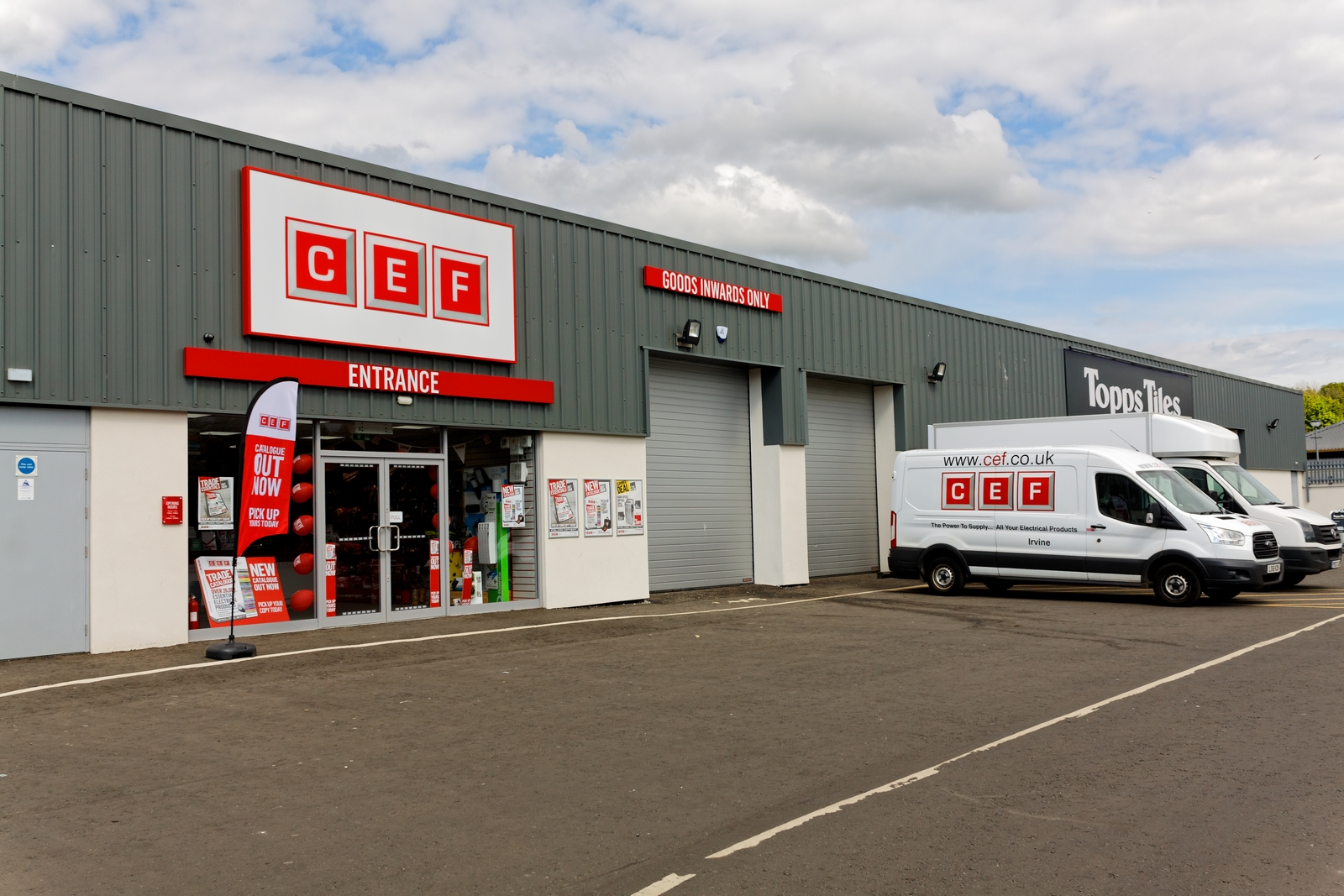
Branch outside Irvine, Scotland in 2019

City Electrical Factors (CEF) is a British electrical equipment wholesaler based in Kenilworth, Warwickshire. Its affiliate in the United States and other countries operates as City Electric Supply (CES).

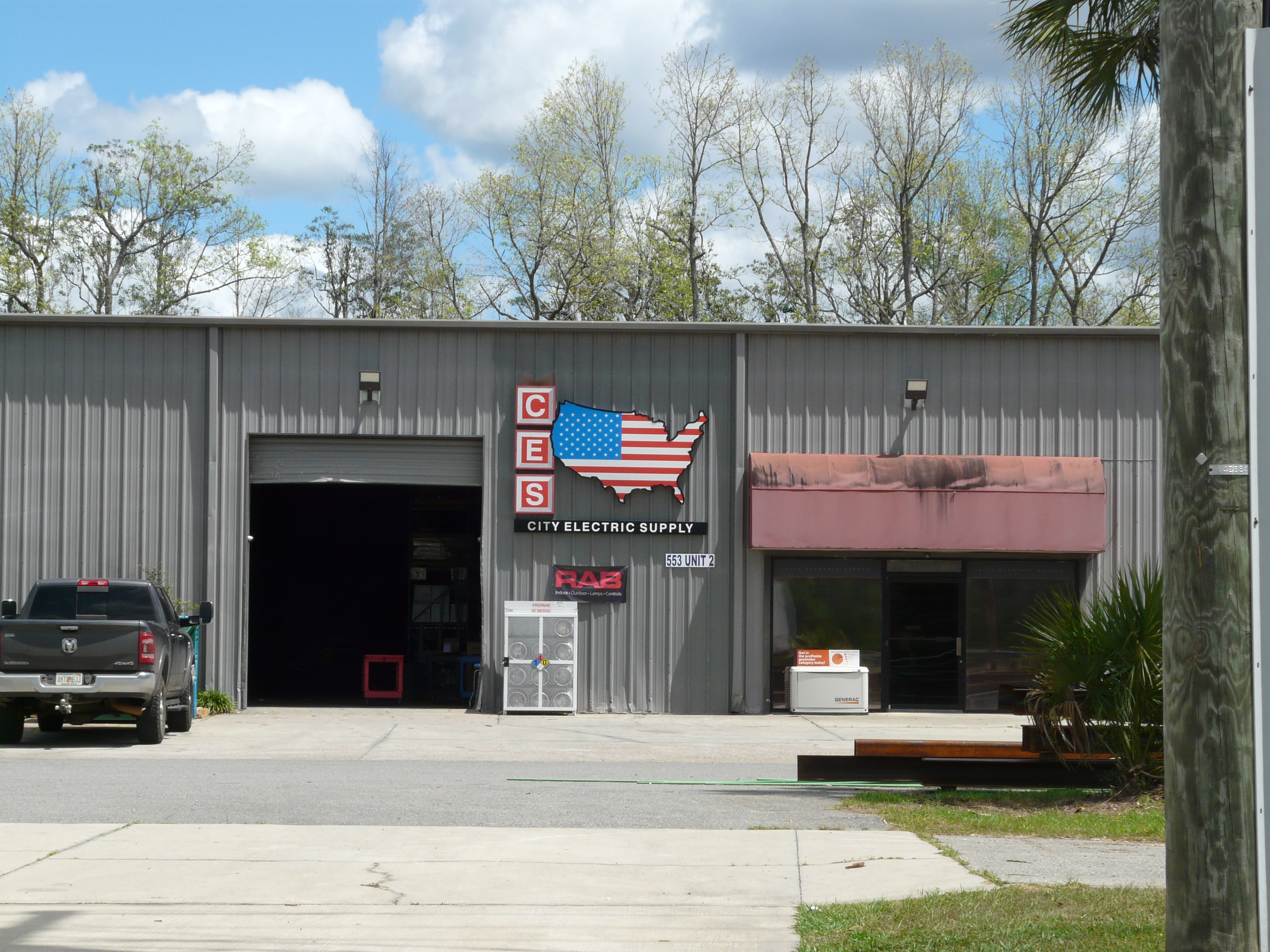
Branch in Tallahassee, Florida

The company was incorporated in Coventry in 1936; in 1951 it was taken over by Tom Mackie, an RAF veteran who expanded it into a chain and internationally; the modern company dates this as its foundation date. His family continue to own it as of 2026.
