= Expansion plans for Milton Keynes =

Abandoned plan for an urban development

In January 2004, Deputy Prime Minister John Prescott announced the United Kingdom government's Expansion plans for Milton Keynes.

The expansion plans proposed that the population of Milton Keynes (ceremonially Buckinghamshire) should double in the subsequent 20 years. to do so, taking Planning controls were taken away from Milton Keynes Council and English Partnerships were made the statutory planning authority, appointed to bring the plan to life. In turn, English Partnerships established a subsidiary Milton Keynes Partnership to manage the programme locally. Their proposal for the next phase of expansion moved away from grid squares to large scale, mixed use, higher density developments which are more based on public transport than private car usage.

However, the change of government in 2010 and the abolition of the Regional Spatial Strategy (SE Plan) in 2012/13 saw these plans revoked and a planned expansion of up to 44,000 dwellings reduced to 28,000. The Milton Keynes Core Strategy was published in July 2013 and regards the figure of 28,000 new homes to be the minimum figure.

== Milton Keynes ==
Milton Keynes is a purpose-built, 'new city' in South East England. It is located about 45 miles (75 km) north-west of London, 60 miles (97 km) south-east of Birmingham, and approximately midway between Oxford and Cambridge. The "designated area", alongside some of the surrounding towns and villages, forms the unitary authority of the Borough of Milton Keynes.

== Planning control in Milton Keynes ==
Most development requires planning permission and it the responsibility of the local planning authority to decide if the type of development proposed is acceptable.

In Milton Keynes, from 2004 to 2011 there were two local planning authorities: Milton Keynes Partnership (MKP) and Milton Keynes Council (MKC).

MKP covered the Northern, Western and Eastern Expansion Areas and remaining sites within the existing grid squares of Oxley Park, Tattenhoe Park and Kingsmead. MKP was also the Local Planning Authority for Land adjoining the A421 containing Eagle Farm and Glebe Farm, identified as "strategic reserve" sites. MKC retains planning powers for the remainder of the city and for smaller development within the Expansion Areas.

In June 2004 Milton Keynes Partnership Committee (MKPC), was created by the Government and was a committee of the Homes and Communities Agency (HCA), the national housing and regeneration agency for England. MKPC was created to ensure a co-ordinated approach to planning and delivery of growth and development in the 'new city'.

The partnership brought together Milton Keynes Council, HCA, Local Strategic Partnership representatives from the health, community and business sectors and independent representation. The role of MKPC was to co-ordinate and implement the delivery of growth and ensure that homes, infrastructure, jobs and community facilities were provided as part of a joined up approach.

The day-to-day activities of MKPC were carried out by its staff of management, professional and technical experts, known collectively as Milton Keynes Partnership (MKP).

Milton Keynes Partnership was disbanded in 2011, holding its last meeting in March of that year. Its functions were folded back into the Homes and Communities Agency (HCA), with Milton Keynes Council handling planning permission for established areas of the city.

== Immediate impact: East and West flanks ==
The immediate practical impact of the government's plans was its publication on 24 March 2004 of a Statutory Instrument, the Milton Keynes (Urban Area and Planning Functions) Order 2004, SI 2004 No.932, that expanded the designated area to include large greenfield blocks to the west and east of the original area. These blocks are to be developed by 2015 at the latest, substantially so by 2011. These developments are discussed further below.

== Milton Keynes Partnership's strategy ==
MKP's strategy until 2031 is set out in their "A Strategy for Growth to 2031" document. Their model for the next phase of expansion moves away from grid squares to large-scale, mixed-use, higher-density development. They hope that this will lead to a greener, more sustainable Milton Keynes, less dependent upon the private car. Their aim is to encourage a shift towards alternative transportation such as buses and cycling as well as providing a more pedestrian-friendly environment, particularly within Central Milton Keynes ("CMK"). The strategy does not explain how high density development on the east and west flank expansion areas furthers this objective. The draft strategy proposes that "of the outstanding 34,600 new houses to be accommodated up to 2031, between 11,000 and 14,000 will be located within the existing urban area and the remaining 20,600 to 23,600 through peripheral growth of the city."

=== Central Milton Keynes ===
The most significant areas for urban intensification are in Central Milton Keynes ("CMK") and at the northern and southern edges of Campbell Park (see below). Within CMK, development will intensify the existing provision, the most significant being a mixed-use office and retail development known as "The Hub:MK" (originally, "CBX III"). Other proposals for CMK will see the removal and building upon the somewhat profligate surface car parks – particularly along Avebury Boulevard. These will be replaced by multi-storey car parking, releasing the land for better use. Their Hub:MK development is intended to rectify this with buildings of between 8 and 14 storeys in height. These stand out from existing development, which in general is around 4-storey. Other taller structures are being built in the central grid squares, including a new 8-storey building in the Theatre District and a 9-storey building partially housing a new Sainsbury's store. In April 2022 a new 20-storey building, containing a new hotel, Hotel La Tour, with a rooftop restaurant, opened overlooking MK:Centre to the west and Campbell Park to the east.

=== Campbell Park ===
In Campbell Park, the intent is to create "a vibrant 24-hour community to bring life into the centre". Development will consist, they say, of high quality apartments with live / work spaces. A series of 'green fingers' or 'wildlife corridors' will be created running out from the park in the centre to the neighbouring areas of Conniburrow to the north and Springfield to the south. These corridors are intended not only to allow wildlife movement throughout the park but to encourage people from other areas to come and use it. The strategy proposes a density of 100 dwellings per hectare, primarily for one or two person households. Additionally, a marina on the Grand Union Canal is planned for the east of the grid square, near the junction with the proposed Bedford Arm of the canal. These areas will be built up as town houses and 3-5-storey apartments.

=== East and west flanks ===
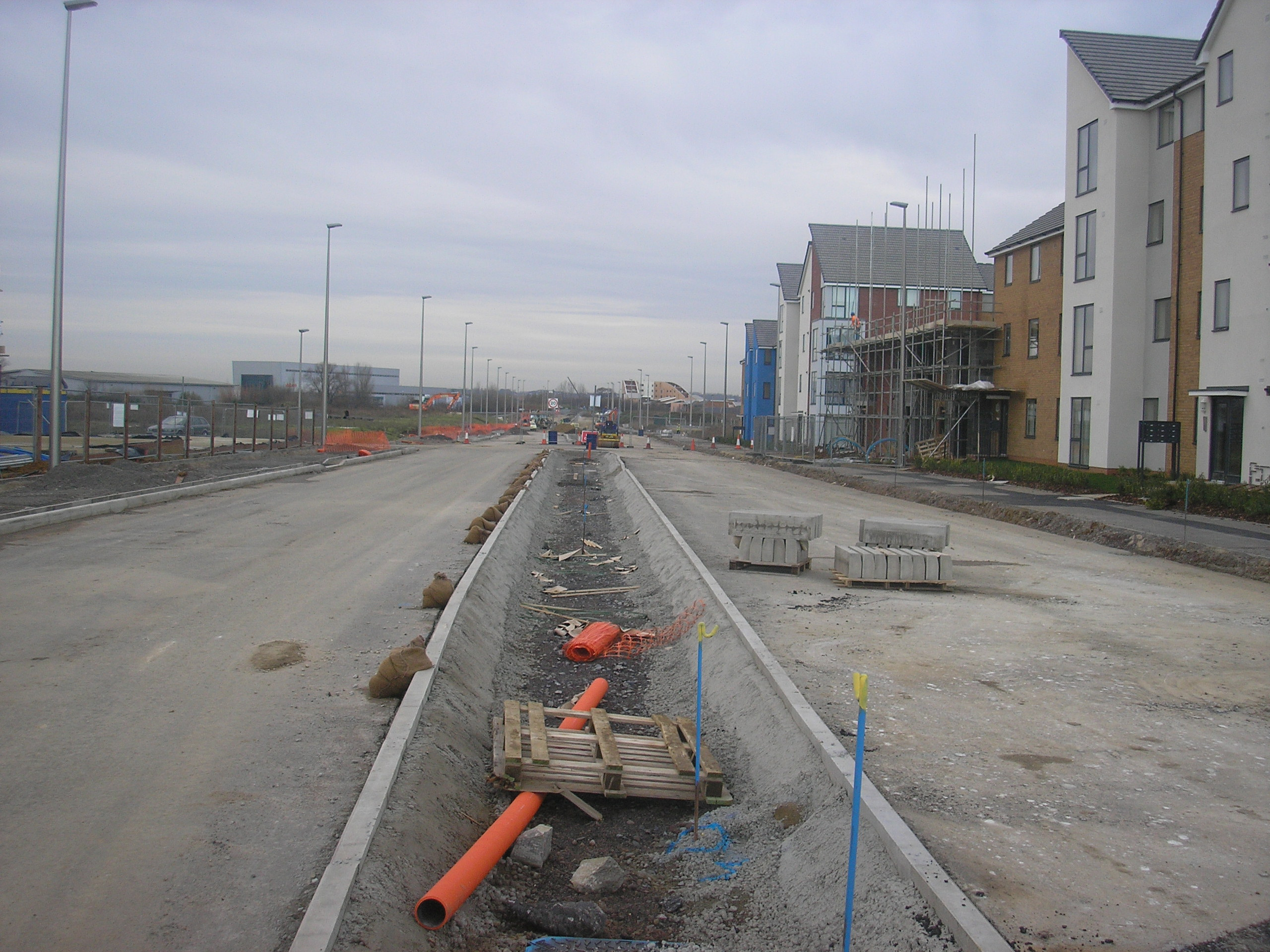
A new 'city street' under construction in Broughton Gate, Eastern Expansion Area

In the shorter term, MKP have created development briefs for the East and West flanks that call for high density development well away from the centre, without any grid roads (although featuring 'city streets' which serve a similar purpose but do not follow the grid pattern and lack the green spaces on either side). The areas will have restricted parking facilities – expecting instead that the population will rely on public transport. The target density here is 35 dwellings per hectare. The larger of these begins south of Stony Stratford in the parish of Calverton and is an area the size of three grid squares (about 3 km²) but without any grid roads. This area has been named 'Fairfield'. In his ruling that this development be near Stony Stratford rather than near Whaddon, the Planning Enquiry Inspector remarked that expansion towards Whaddon is inevitable in future developments (beyond the timescale of the plan) unless further expansion crosses the M1. In his view, the M1 need not be considered a barrier to development – though this is contrary to the view of the present Borough Council administration.

On the eastern flank, the first area to be built on will be 'Broughton Gate' (bounded by Broughton, Kingston and the A5130). This will include an extension to the H7 Chaffron Way grid road as far as the A5130, but will not go further and join the Salford Road (with its M1 crossing), thus impeding any further expansion east of the M1. (The plan actually proposes that Salford Road be downgraded to a Redway, closing it to other traffic. A second M1 crossing, Broughton Grounds Lane, is ignored completely – though in the planning application for the enabling infrastructure, the existence of the lane has been reinstated.) After this the area to the east of the A5130 as far as the M1 motorway and bounded on the south by the A421 will be developed in parts as a residential and industrial estate. The H7 will again extend east through this area, as a city street, turning south upon meeting another city street and meeting the A421. Along the A421 a new employment complex named 'Nova' is planned. Whilst acknowledging the benefit of the grid system, the plan explicitly rules out any role for the former A5130 as a V12 grid route and the development map shows that HGVs will not be permitted to use it.

Further expansion is proposed for the south-east and south-west flanks - see (below)

On 19 November 2009 the MK Citizen reported that it was now likely that the Western Expansion Area would be built with grid roads. The article stated that the H2, H3 and V2 may be extended into the development, to be confirmed by Gallagher Estates' planning application. This follows six months of negotiations on the subject between Gallagher and Milton Keynes Council.

=== Oakgrove Millennium Community ===
At Oakgrove (near Middleton), they proposed initially to divert and funnel the V10 Brickhill Street through the heart of the new community and build over the space vacated, including the green routes on either side of it.

Oakgrove is planned to be a completely different style of estate featuring new traffic calming measures, a wildlife corridor and high-density housing, constructed as part of the national Millennium Communities Programme.

On 28 February 2007 the MK News newspaper reported that the V10 diversion plan had been withdrawn. The Citizen confirmed this the following day. English Partnerships have reportedly stated that they respect the importance of the grid system to the population of Milton Keynes. However, [then] Council Leader Isobel McCall stated at the time that she continued to support the "City Street" concept, saying that there was no formal opposition to the concept when first proposed (without saying when any opportunity to do so ever arose).

=== South-east and south-west expansion ===
The Draft Strategy proposes (at 13.10)

Growth Area 1 (South East)

The South-eastern Growth Area consists of approximately 385 hectares (951 acres) of land, and is a triangular parcel of land extending from the existing built up area of Milton Keynes around Wavendon east towards the M1 motorway. This parcel of land is bounded by the A421 to the north, the M1 to the east and the Marston Vale Line to the south. "Access to this area will be made by extending the H10 Bletcham Way". The report goes on to say (13.31, .32) that the development will sweep around Woburn Sands and Aspley Guise without coalescing with them, but that Wavendon will be assimilated. This area is currently being considered as a 'reserve', and greater priority has been given to the Linford Park (northern), Fairfield (western) and Broughton Gate/Nova (eastern) expansion sites mentioned above.

Growth Area 2 and 3 (South West) – and Salden Chase

The South-western Growth Area proposal was for approximately 875 hectares (2,161 acres) and was to be bounded at its north-east by the southwest point of the existing built up area (West Bletchley) and at its East by the brickfields and landfill site to the south of Bletchley. The area was to be enclosed to the north by the A421 (running east to west across Milton Keynes) and at the south by the road running southwest from Water Eaton to Drayton Parslow. This would have absorbed and expanded Newton Longville in a similar way to the other villages that predate the new city. However, the [HMG] Planning Inspector struck out this proposal, saying that any expansion should be constrained to the south by the disused Bletchley-Bicester railway line.

The more recent Aylesbury Vale Local Development Framework (2009) proposes a more limited version of this vision. The Council proposes (and MKP agrees) to zone land between the railway line and present A421 for 5,360 dwellings, called Salden Chase. The plan explicitly excludes Newton Longville itself from the expansion area. The plan also includes land reservation for a new Newton Longville railway station and for a new link road between the A421 and the A4146 bypassing Newton Longville to the northwest.

=== Northern expansion ===
There are two sites to the north of the city that were designated as expansion areas in the 2004 plans. The first is named 'Redhouse Park' and is a residential and industrial district located north of Giffard Park near the M1 Motorway service station. The other area was initially called 'Stantonbury Park Farm' (now called Oakridge Park) and consists of a small residential development north east of New Bradwell. Construction on both these sites is complete.

In 2016, developer Gallagher Estates proposed a substantial further expansion northwards between the railway line and the M1 at Haversham, north of the River Great Ouse. In the February 2017 draft of the Council's "Local Plan to 2031" ("Plan:MK"), the location is no longer shown as a potential strategic expansion area.

=== Urban intensification ===
MKP believes that the settlements along Saxon Street (V7) are insufficiently dense to support a sustainable public transport strategy. In a leaked report, MKP appears to be proposing demolition and rebuilding up to six districts at higher population density. The report acknowledges that "Milton Keynes is a planned city and therefore does not contain the obvious degraded and run-down districts that many of our cities possess: areas which clearly lend themselves to policy interventions, aimed at securing urban regeneration and tackling social exclusion." Nevertheless, it does correctly identify some early building that will not last another 25 years. "6.4 Much of the housing within this area was built using innovative construction methods and materials such that many are likely to be nearing the end of their structural life well before 2031, despite some renovation and improvement work that has taken place in certain areas. The declining housing standards are reflected in the findings of the city’s Social Atlas that shows the highest levels of social deprivation are found within these areas." The target density here is 40 dwellings per hectare.

Responding, MKP's chairman Sir Bob Reid denied that any such decision had been taken.

== Reaction of existing residents and neighbouring councils ==
As might be anticipated, these plans are controversial. Two former staff members of Milton Keynes Development Corporation (an architect/ex County Councilor and a Professor of town planning) have written to the local papers in vehement terms, decrying the poverty of imagination and conventional-town thinking being displayed in the proposals. They argue for an international competition to provide an inspiring vision for the next 25 years. The chairman of local branch of the Federation of Small Businesses remarks "The consultants have picked up a standard report and inserted a few MK references. Nowhere in the document is there an understanding of how Milton Keynes has got to where we are today and why we are successful."

Commenting on the plans, Aylesbury Vale District Council said (8 August 2006) 'Expansion plans for Milton Keynes are "seriously and fundamentally flawed" '. The council’s response criticises the growth plans for:

- Failing to take proper account of public opinion and the concerns and issues raised by earlier public consultation
- Not doing enough to accommodate more housing within Milton Keynes
- Failing to identify a new transport strategy for public transport and other environmentally friendly modes of transport, both for the existing city and the expansion areas
- Not taking proper account of the impact on either the existing communities that will be affected or the local landscape
- Not giving proper consideration to the growth options to the east of the M1 motorway
- Failing to identify defined boundaries to the urban area to provide long-term protection for the countryside around Milton Keynes, particularly those areas adjacent to the planned growth near Newton Longville

Subsequently, Buckinghamshire County Council and Aylesbury Vale District Council commissioned Town Planning consultants Colin Buchanan and Partners to review the expansion proposals. According to Bucks CC, Buchanan found the MKP plans to be flawed in both research and conclusions. The two councils pressed strongly for any expansion to occur east of the M1 motorway, between Moulsoe and Newport Pagnell.

== Draft Regional Spatial Strategy - The South East Plan: Panel Report ==
In their report on the Draft Regional Spatial Strategy for the South-East Region, the Planning Inspectors Panel made a number of important statements that affect the expansion of Milton Keynes to 2026.

- The plan should add 2,400 dwellings for housing outside the Milton Keynes urban area to the district-wide total. (para 23.39)
- They saw 'no reason for Newport Pagnell to have a significantly higher level of growth than previously, unless it were incorporated into a planned expansion of Milton Keynes east of the M1', adding that they do not see any need for this before 2026. They go on to note the southwards expansion of Newport Pagnell (towards Moulsoe) is constrained by the flood plain of the River Ouzel at Caldecote. (para 23.40)
- In reference to expanding the grid system into the expansion areas, they were "not convinced" that this would necessarily be the most appropriate solution for future expansion. (para 23.62)
- The scale of the south east extension area should be larger than recommended in the MK 2031 strategy, and the south west be proportionately smaller. (paras 23.123, 23.124) and that the start of construction in the south east extension area should be phased for 2011-16 and for the south west 2016-21. (paras 23.127- 23.130) The panel's version of the expansion will fill the wedge between the Marston Vale Line and the M1, potentially as far as Junction 13.
- The text should make clear that the housing levels are consistent with the overall aspiration for 68,600 additional homes 2001-31 in the MKSM strategy, and clarify that additional employment land will be provided as part of the future urban extensions to Milton Keynes. (paras 23.37, 23.23)
- While declining to be specific about planning guidance beyond the scope of the Inquiry (i.e., to 2026), the Inspectors do not consider that they would be justified at this stage in ruling out provision to the east of the M1 after 2026 or in identifying the M1 as a permanent boundary for the city. (paras 23.131).

=== Consultants' review of the Panel Report on behalf of the Councils affected ===
In response to the Panel Report, the Councils and District Councils of Aylesbury Vale, Mid-Bedfordshire and Milton Keynes jointly commissioned consultants GVA Grimley to prepare a report on the likely real-world impacts of its proposals for south-west and south-east "Strategic Development Areas" (SDAs). In summary, it concludes that the proposals as stated would not be realistic and goes on to propose a modified version.

It concludes that the South East SDA (the wedge between the M1 and the Marston Vale line with its apex near Junction 13) will not accommodate the 10,400 dwellings at 30 per hectare (30 dph) as proposed in the Panel Report, though it could do so 40 or 50dph. The Consultants view is that the highest density would not be appropriate. Short of a density even greater than 50 dph, there is insufficient land in Mid-Bedfordshire to accommodate the 5,600 dwellings proposed by the Panel. The consultants recommend a density of 40/45 dph here, with a green buffer around Aspley Guise, albeit with access to its station.

It concludes that the South West SDA cannot be constrained at its southern boundary by the (disused) Bletchley-Oxford line without unacceptable ribbon development along the A421 south of Whaddon. Accordingly, it proposes that development be moved closer to Far Bletchley and Newton Longville, with a green buffer around the latter and a clear western boundary east of Whaddon. For this SDA, the consultants recommend a density of 30/40 dph.

The Councils have yet to respond to the review. It is clear that its proposals are inconsistent with Mid-Bedfordshire's wish for a very large green belt south of the city.

=== Ministerial confirmation of the Panel report - plus development across the M1 ===
In the ministerial ruling, the Panel's rulings are confirmed, with some important exceptions. The Minister has deleted the original proposal to locate 5,700 dwellings in "the Aspley Guise triangle" because it is out of the scope of a South East plan and is for the East of England plan to make (though there is a strong hint that it should do so). Consequently, this housing provision must be met from within the Borough and thus on the east side of the M1. The Minister rules further that this provision must not obstruct any future potential expansion in this area.

The summary statement is that

The policy provides for some 49,950 dwellings to be added to the urban area between 2006 and 2026, consistent with the overall aspiration for 68,600 additional homes between 2001 and 2031 set out in the [Milton Keynes and South Midlands] strategy.

== Grid system expansion plans already in the pipeline ==
Despite the new developments not following the grid principle, several new extensions are planned to the grid network. They are listed below in numerical order, listing H-roads first.

- H4 Dansteed Way western: As part of the WEA plans the H4 will extend along the land reserved for it west of its present end in Grange Farm to link up with the extended V2 (see below).
- H7 Chaffron Way western: A downgraded H7 is planned to extend further between Kingsmead and Tattenhoe Park, according to the Kingsmead South master plan.
- H7 Chaffron Way eastern: the H7, as a 'city street' is planned to extend through Broughton Gate (Eastern Expansion Area) to the A5130.
- V2 Tattenhoe Street north: The V2 will extend north to the top of Grange Farm before becoming a 'city street' and running north into Fairfield (Western Expansion Area). It will not extend to the east of Stony Stratford.
- V7 Saxon Street north: In the form of a 'city street', the V7 will penetrate the new district of Stantonbury Park Farm and loop round back on to the old Newport Pagnell - Wolverton Road, according to the master plan for the development.
- V8 Marlborough Street south: The V8 is planned to run alongside the A5 to join H10 Bletcham Way at Fenny Lock.
- V10 Brickhill Street north: The V10 is being extended north to meet Little Linford Lane, providing an alternative route from Newport Pagnell at the Poets Estate. However this stretch is not designated 'V10' and will have a 30 mph (48 km/h) speed limit.

== Land banking fraud ==
If you've come here to look at the building plots being sold in the meadow, please consult a solicitor before parting with any money - especially the 10% non-refundable deposit. There is no planning permission, it is not scheduled for development, nor is it likely to be scheduled for development in the near future. The so-called road access is a bridleway and footpath in one direction and a field gate from the other. Both are single-track and there is practically no likelihood that they will ever be anything else.

Ask yourself: If this land is so valuable, why does the owner want to sell it so cheaply and quickly? It would make more sense to hang on to it until it becomes worth the sums claimed.

— Notice near Milton Keynes

The credible expectation that Milton Keynes and its borough will continue to grow has provided a convincing back story for land banking scams.

== See also ==
- Thames Gateway
