= Homes England =

Public body that funds new affordable housing in England

Agency overview
- Formed: 1 January 2018
- Preceding agencies: Homes and Communities Agency; Housing Corporation
- Type: Non-ministerial government department
- Jurisdiction: England
- Headquarters: Birchwood, Warrington, England (registered office); 53.4156°N 2.5352°W
- Agency executives: Pat Ritchie, Chairman; Eamonn Boylan, Chief Executive Officer
- Parent department: Ministry of Housing, Communities and Local Government
- Website: gov.uk/government/organisations/homes-england

Homes England is the non-departmental public body that funds new affordable housing in England. It was launched on 1 January 2018 as the operating name of the Homes and Communities Agency (HCA) alongside the removal of the Agency's regulatory role (by The Legislative Reform (Regulator of Social Housing) (England) Order 2018). HCA was established by the Housing and Regeneration Act 2008 as one of the successor bodies to the Housing Corporation, and became operational on 1 December 2008.

== History ==
On 17 January 2007, Ruth Kelly announced proposals to bring together the investment functions of the Housing Corporation, English Partnerships and parts of the Department for Communities and Local Government to form a new unified housing and regeneration agency. It would also incorporate the functions of the Academy for Sustainable Communities and the government's advisory team for large applications.

In the following months, Martin Cave, Director of the Centre for Management under Regulation at University of Warwick, led the most comprehensive review of English housing regulation for 30 years. Reporting in June, the Cave Review recommended that a new regulator be set up, separating the regulation and investment responsibilities of the Housing Corporation.

On 15 October 2007, Yvette Cooper announced that the Government accepted the recommendation of the Cave Review to transfer the Corporation's regulatory powers to an independent body, subsequently named as the Tenant Services Authority (TSA). The new investment body was initially announced as "Communities England", and later renamed as the Homes and Communities Agency.

=== Homes and Communities Agency (HCA) ===
The chief executive for the body was announced as Bob Kerslake in December 2007. Kerslake had led the regeneration of Sheffield as chief executive of the City Council since 1997.

On 17 October 2008, the Housing Minister Iain Wright announced the Board members of the HCA including Robert Napier (chair), Kate Barker, Candy Atherton, and Shaukat Moledina (previously vice-chair of the Housing Corporation).

Kerslake was appointed as a permanent secretary at the agency's parent Department for Communities and Local Government in September 2010. The HCA announced that it would appoint an interim chief executive from existing staff.

Housing minister Grant Shapps announced early on that the TSA would be abolished as part of the cull of quangos by the coalition government after the 2010 general election. In June 2010, he said that the HCA would be retained but become "smaller, more strategic - with the HCA's functions being delivered under local leadership."

In September 2010, the HCA was also included on a list of organisations being considered for closure. However, Shapps announced in October that the TSA would be merged into the HCA. In November, he confirmed that the HCA would be retained, but reformed to cut running costs.

==== Kickstart initiative ====
The HCA's Kickstart programme provided grants to developers in order to rescue stalled projects during the Great Recession, helping to maintain employment and output of new homes. One notable Kickstart projects was a £45.6 million investment in Berkeley Homes to provide 555 new homes for rent on the open market, located in London, the south east and south west. However, after a campaign for disclosure by Building Design magazine, the agency revealed that many Kickstart projects failed to meet CABE's standards of good design.

==== Social Housing Regulator ====
The HCA acted as the government's Social Housing Regulator following abolition of the TSA. It provided regular reports on each registered social housing agency in England. In March 2014, it made its first ruling that a housing association had breached its "serious detriment" threshold for harm to consumers for its home repairs against Circle 33, due to "chronic and long standing difficulties in the delivery of the repairs service".

In Scotland this function is performed by the Scottish Housing Regulator. In Wales, the function is carried out by the Welsh government.

=== Homes England ===
The Homes and Communities Agency (HCA) became Homes England in January 2018, with a remit to acquire land and support brownfield development to help boost housing supply. In October 2018, under chairman Sir Edward Lister and CEO Nick Walkley, it published its first five-year strategy to deliver more homes in areas of greatest need, restating the government's ambition to deliver 300,000 new homes a year on average. It planned to "significantly increase" housing delivery across South East England and to provide "additional professional skills capacity" for councils.

In August 2019, Lister stepped down as chair of Homes England to focus on a newly created role as chief strategic adviser to Prime Minister Boris Johnson. He was succeeded as chairman by Peter Freeman in October 2020, and, after a three-year stint, was confirmed as chair for a further two years in October 2023. Walkley stepped down as CEO in January 2021, and was succeeded by Peter Denton in August 2021.

==== Modern Methods of Construction (MMC) ====
In March 2021, Homes England began a six-year, 1,800 home Modern Methods of Construction (MMC) Research Commission, aiming to improve construction productivity and encourage the uptake of MMC in housing delivery. In its second five-year strategy, published in May 2023, it committed to further support for MMC initiatives.

In November 2019, Homes England had invested £30 million into the Ilke Homes modular homes business; it invested a further £30 million in September 2021. Despite a further fund-raising round, raising £100 million in December 2022, Ilke Homes went into administration on 30 June 2023, with most of the company's 1,150 staff made redundant, and creditors owed £320 million, including £68 million owed to Homes England. Eventually, Homes England would get back just £5 million of its 2019 loan to company. L&G Modular Homes halted production in May 2023, blaming planning delays and the COVID-19 pandemic for its failure, with the enterprise incurring total losses over seven years of £295 million. In November 2023, Homes England loaned £15 million to TopHat, another loss-making MMC housebuilder, to fund construction of a factory in Corby; in March 2024, the factory's opening was postponed.

In January 2024, following the collapse of Ilke Homes and several other MMC companies (including L&G Modular Homes and House by Urban Splash) during 2022 and 2023, the House of Lords Built Environment Committee highlighted that the UK Government needed to be more coherent in addressing barriers affecting adoption of MMC: "If the Government wants the sector to be a success, it needs to take a step back, acquire a better understanding of how it works and the help that it needs, set achievable goals and develop a coherent strategy." Millions of pounds of public money had been invested, but "Homes England has not given any clear metrics as to how success is to be measured and over what timescale". In late March 2024, housing minister Lee Rowley told the Lords Committee that the government would be reviewing its MMC policies in light of the crisis in the volumetric house-building sector. He promised "a full update in late spring once we have undertaken further detailed work with the sector".

==== Sale of ransom strips ====
In 2020, the pilot sale of microplots was compared to driveway ransoms when Homes England wrote to householders in Birmingham warning that Homes England owned microplots between the household and the public road. Homes England said it had written to 90 householders; however a freedom of information request found over 500 microplots for sale in the Redditch and Bromsgrove boroughs. Homes England said that if householders did not purchase microplots they could be sold to third parties. A third party sale was expected by homeowners to result in the microplot being used as a ransom strip.

=== National Housing Bank ===
In 2026, the National Housing Bank was opened by Homes England, with the aim to "crowd-in" investment in affordable housing.

== See also ==
- Homelessness in England
