= Millennium Communities Programme =

The Millennium Communities Programme (or Millennium Villages initiative), is an English Partnerships initiative to construct 7 new 'villages' that are intended to 'set the standard for 21st Century living, and to serve as a model for the creation of new communities' in England.

This is to be achieved by promoting innovative building technologies, increased economic and social self-sufficiency, high urban design standards, and sustainable development principles.

== The villages ==
A competition for the development of the first of the 'Millennium Villages', Greenwich Millennium Village, was launched in 1997. It is expected that 6,000 new homes will have been completed within the programme by 2010, although construction will continue beyond this.

The full list of Millennium Communities is:

- Greenwich Millennium Village, London
- Allerton Bywater Millennium Community, near Leeds
- New Islington Millennium Community, Manchester
- South Lynn Millennium Community, King's Lynn
- Telford Millennium Community, Telford
- Oakgrove Millennium Community, Milton Keynes
- Hastings Millennium Community, Hastings

== Environmental objectives ==
Among the environmental aims are cutting energy used during constructing 50%, energy consumption by 20%, water consumed by 20%, and waste disposal by 50%.

Some of the villages plan to go beyond this - for example Greenwich plans to cut primary energy used by 80% using low-energy building techniques and renewable energy technologies.

== Similar programmes ==
- Vauban, Freiburg, Germany
- BedZED, London

== See also ==
- Code for Sustainable Homes
- Energy efficiency in British housing
- Environmental design
- Sustainable architecture
- Sustainable Communities Plan
