= Housing Corporation =

The Housing Corporation was the non-departmental public body that funded new affordable housing and regulated housing associations in England. It was established by the Housing Act 1964. On 1 December 2008, its functions were transferred to two new organisations, the Homes and Communities Agency and the Tenant Services Authority. The corporation was formally dissolved on 1 April 2009 by the Housing Corporation (Dissolution) Order 2009.

The last chairman of the Housing Corporation was Peter Dixon, and his deputy was Shaukat Moledina.

== Successor bodies ==
On 17 January 2007, Ruth Kelly announced proposals to bring together the investment functions of the Housing Corporation, English Partnerships and parts of the Department for Communities and Local Government to form a new unified housing and regeneration agency.

In the following months, Professor Martin Cave, Director of the Centre for Management under Regulation at University of Warwick, led the most comprehensive review of English housing regulation for 30 years. Reporting in June, the Cave Review recommended that a new regulatory agency be set up, separating the regulation and investment responsibilities of the Housing Corporation.

On 15 October 2007, Yvette Cooper announced that the Government accepted the recommendation of the Cave Review to transfer the Corporation's regulatory powers to an independent body. Initially this was to be named the Office for Tenants and Social Landlords, but its name was subsequently changed to the Tenant Services Authority. The new investment body was initially announced as "Communities England", later renamed as the Homes and Communities Agency.

The legislative framework for both new bodies is contained in the Housing and Regeneration Act 2008, which gained royal assent on 22 July 2008. They became operational on 1 December 2008.

== Energy efficiency ==
As the Corporation required the housing associations it funded to achieve EcoHomes standards, the Housing Corporation was indirectly responsible for building the greatest number of environmentally friendly homes in the UK. Eco-performance standards are to be raised further for grants provided in 2008–2010, when compliance exceeding Level 3 of the new Code for Sustainable Homes will be required.

== See also ==
- Housing Corporation (Delegation) etc. Act 2006 – retrospective legislation to legalise decisions delegated below Board level
