= English Partnerships =

English Partnerships (EP) was the national regeneration agency for England, performing a similar role on a national level to that fulfilled by regional development agencies on a regional level. On 1 December 2008 its powers passed to a successor body, the new Homes and Communities Agency.

It was responsible for land acquisition and assembly and major development projects, alone or in joint partnership with private sector developers. It was particularly active in major regeneration areas such as the Thames Gateway and in expansion areas such as Milton Keynes, where the Deputy Prime Minister (acting as Environment Minister) removed planning from local control and appointed them as the statutory planning authority.

It was a non-departmental public body funded through the Department for Communities and Local Government (CLG), and was previously by the Office of the Deputy Prime Minister (the predecessor department to CLG).

== Structure ==
English Partnerships was legally two entirely independent bodies set up under separate statutes. One was the Commission for New Towns, launched in October 1961, which was responsible for the development corporations established by the New Towns Act 1959.

The other was the Urban Regeneration Agency set up by the Leasehold Reform, Housing and Urban Development Act 1993. The URA originated as the English Industrial Estates Corporation, which was "established in 1936 as North Eastern Trading Estates Ltd to help to alleviate the problems caused by the decline of heavy industries such as shipbuilding and coalmining".

== Successor ==
On 17 January 2007 Ruth Kelly, the Secretary of State for Communities and Local Government, announced proposals to bring together the delivery functions of the Housing Corporation, English Partnerships and parts of CLG to form a new unified housing and regeneration agency, the Homes and Communities Agency (initially announced as "Communities England"); this became operational on 1 December 2008.

== See also ==
- Millennium Communities Programme, EP initiative
- EcoHomes
- Neil Shields, Chairman of the Commission for New Towns 1982–1995
