= Ministry of Housing, Communities and Local Government =

Ministerial department of the UK Government

Department overview
- Formed: May 2002 (as the Office of the Deputy Prime Minister); May 2006 (as Department for Communities and Local Government); January 2018 (as Ministry of Housing, Communities and Local Government); September 2021 (as Department for Levelling Up, Housing and Communities); July 2024 (as Ministry of Housing, Communities and Local Government)
- Jurisdiction: Government of the United Kingdom (England only)
- Headquarters: 2 Marsham Street, London, England and i9, Railway Drive, Wolverhampton, England
- Annual budget: £28.1 billion (current) & £3.5 billion (capital) for 2011–12
- Secretary of State responsible: Angela Rayner, Secretary of State for Housing, Communities and Local Government
- Department executive: Will Garton, Interim Permanent Secretary
- Website: gov.uk/mhclg

- Applies to: England
- Relates to: Housing, communities, and local government

Other UK counterparts
- Northern Ireland: Various, see § Devolution
- Scotland: Communities Directorates; Learning and Justice Directorates
- Wales: Local Government, Housing, Climate Change and Rural Affairs Group

The Ministry of Housing, Communities and Local Government (MHCLG) is a ministerial department of the Government of the United Kingdom. It is responsible for housing, communities, and local government in England. It was established in May 2006 and is the successor to the Office of the Deputy Prime Minister, established in 2001. The department shares its headquarters building, at 2 Marsham Street in London, with the Home Office.

Its responsibilities are devolved policies, therefore it does not have responsibility in Scotland, Wales or Northern Ireland, with the Scottish Government, Welsh Government, and Northern Ireland Executive each having their own departments responsible for housing, communities and local government in their respective jurisdictions.

== Ministers ==
MHCLG's ministers are as follows, with cabinet ministers in bold:

Minister	Portrait	Office	Portfolio
**Angela Rayner** MP		Secretary of State for Housing, Communities and Local Government	Strategic oversight of the department's business
**Matthew Pennycook** MP		Minister of State for Housing and Planning	Planning reform and the National Planning Policy Framework; Housing delivery, including large-scale new settlements programme (New Towns); Brownfield Infrastructure Land and Housing Infrastructure Funds; Housing supply strategy; Homes England and Planning Inspectorate sponsorship; HM Land Registry and land transparency; Social housing; Social and Affordable Homes Programme; Housing quality; Private rented sector; Leasehold and commonhold reform; Planning casework
Florence Eshalomi MP		Minister of State for Homelessness, Democracy, Communities and Faith	Communities, including parks, playgrounds and green spaces and private parking; Social cohesion; Faith; Homelessness and rough sleeping; Supported housing and domestic abuse; Resettlement; Elections policy
Sally Jameson MP		Parliamentary Under-Secretary of State	No10 North Devolution strategy. Jointly with Cabinet Office.
Jim McMahon MP		Parliamentary Under-Secretary of State for Local Government, Devolution and Regional Growth	Local government finance, including local taxation, business rates and local government pensions; Local government policy, including standards, stewardship, local audit and governance; Local government reorganisation ; English devolution, including integrated settlements, Combined Authorities and pan-regional bodies; Local and regional growth and investment; Growth funds, including Pride in Place and Community Right to Buy Fund; Community ownership and co-operative development; High streets and town centres; Town and parish councils; Planning casework
Sharon Taylor, Baroness Taylor of Stevenage		Parliamentary Under-Secretary of State for Housing and Local Government	Lead on legislation in the House of Lords; Homeownership and homebuying process; New Homes Ombudsman and redress; Sponsorship of Regulator of Social Housing; Housing delivery and strategy engagement; Local government engagement; Planning casework; Corporate matters
Judith Blake, Baroness Blake of Leeds		Parliamentary Under-Secretary of State for Building Safety, Fire and Resilience	Building safety, regulations, Building Safety Regulator and remediation; Grenfell Inquiry response; Fire policy and operations; Grenfell Community, Tower and Memorial; Net Zero and energy efficiency; Resilience, recovery, and emergencies; Government Spokesperson for Equalities; Planning casework

The Interim permanent secretary is Will Garton, who took up his post in July 2026.

== History ==
MHCLG was formed in July 2001 as part of the Cabinet Office with the title Office of the Deputy Prime Minister (ODPM), headed by the then deputy prime minister, John Prescott. In May 2002 the ODPM became a separate department after absorbing the local government and regions portfolios from the defunct Department for Transport, Local Government and the Regions. The ODPM was criticised in some quarters for adding little value and the Environmental Audit Committee had reported negatively on the department in the past. During the 5 May 2006 reshuffle of Tony Blair's government, it was renamed and Ruth Kelly succeeded David Miliband (cabinet-level minister of state for communities and local government within the ODPM) to become the first secretary of state for communities and local government at the Department for Communities and Local Government (DCLG). In January 2018, as part of Theresa May's Cabinet reshuffle, the department was renamed the Ministry of Housing, Communities and Local Government (MHCLG). In September 2021, Boris Johnson renamed the department yet again, calling it the Department for Levelling Up, Housing and Communities (DLUHC), bringing more powers outside of just England to manage funds across the United Kingdom.

On 20 February 2021, it was announced as part of the government's levelling up policy, that MHCLG would be the first government department to have a headquarters based outside of London. Five hundred posts, including those of senior civil servants, will be moving to Wolverhampton by 2025.

On 23 February 2021, the then secretary of state, Robert Jenrick, announced he was hopeful that staff would be working in Wolverhampton by the summer of 2021. He also announced that they were considering building a new office development in or around the city centre to house the new headquarters. The prime minister, Boris Johnson, suggested it should be within walking distance of local newspaper Express & Star, where he previously did work experience.

With the intention to relocate some 500 members of staff to Wolverhampton, Robert Jenrick officially opened its new Wolverhampton offices at the i9 office development on 10 September 2021. At the opening of the new office development the Secretary of State was joined by the leader of City of Wolverhampton Council Ian Brookfield and the West Midlands Mayor, Andy Street.

On 6 July 2022, most of the ministers responsible for the department resigned after the Chris Pincher scandal. The secretary of state, Michael Gove, also left the department on the same day, after being sacked for disloyalty by the prime minister, Boris Johnson. When Rishi Sunak became prime minister on 25 October 2022, Gove was reappointed as the secretary of state.

Following the Labour Party's victory at the 2024 general election, Angela Rayner was appointed Deputy Prime Minister and Secretary of State for Levelling Up, Housing and Communities on 5 July 2024. The department reverted to its former name, Ministry of Housing, Communities and Local Government on 8 July 2024.

The Office for Local Government ("Oflog"), established in 2023, was an office within the department responsible for providing "authoritative and accessible data and analysis about the performance of local government, and support[ing] its improvement".

Responsibility for English devolution strategy and local economic growth was transferred from the Ministry of Housing, Communities and Local Government (MCHLG) to the Cabinet Office's newly established Number 10 North in Manchester after Andy Burnham became prime minister on 20 July 2026.

=== Levelling Up ===
A Levelling Up Taskforce was formed in September 2021 headed by former Bank of England chief economist Andy Haldane. The Levelling Up policy was not initially defined in detail, but would include:

- Investing in towns, cities, and rural and coastal areas
- Giving those areas more control of how investment is made
- Levelling up skills using apprenticeships and a £3 billion National Skills Fund
- Helping the farming and fishing industries
- Creating up to 10 freeports to help deprived communities

=== Secretaries of state ===
- John Prescott 29 May 2002 – 5 May 2006
- Ruth Kelly 5 May 2006 – 27 June 2007
- Hazel Blears 27 June 2007 – 5 June 2009
- John Denham 5 June 2009 – 11 May 2010
- Eric Pickles 12 May 2010 – 11 May 2015
- Greg Clark 11 May 2015 – 14 July 2016
- Sajid Javid 13 July 2016 – 30 April 2018
- James Brokenshire 30 April 2018 – 24 July 2019
- Robert Jenrick 24 July 2019 – 15 September 2021
- Michael Gove 15 September 2021 – 6 July 2022
- Greg Clark 7 July 2022 – 6 September 2022
- Simon Clarke 6 September 2022 – 25 October 2022
- Michael Gove 25 October 2022 – 5 July 2024
- Angela Rayner 5 July 2024 – 5 September 2025
- Steve Reed 5 September 2025 – 20 July 2026
- Angela Rayner 20 July 2026 – present

== Responsibilities ==
The department is responsible for UK Government policy in the following areas, mainly in England:

- Building regulations
- Community cohesion
- Community resilience (i.e. flood, natural disaster or severe weather preparedness and recovery)
- Fire and rescue services
- Housing
- Local government
- Planning
- Race equality
- Urban regeneration (including The Thames Gateway)

=== Digitising planning ===
MHCLG teams have been actively supporting digitisation of town planning processes as part of the Levelling Up Mission. Under the "Proptech innovation fund", MHCLG has been funding four rounds of digitisation initiatives within various local councils in England.

== Bodies sponsored by MHCLG ==
=== Executive agencies ===
- Planning Inspectorate
- Queen Elizabeth II Centre

The department also was previously responsible for two other agencies. On 18 July 2011 Ordnance Survey was transferred to the Department for Business, Innovation and Skills and on 28 February 2013 the Fire Service College was sold to Capita.

=== Non-departmental public bodies ===
In January 2007, Ruth Kelly announced proposals to bring together the delivery functions of the Housing Corporation, English Partnerships and parts of the then Department for Housing, Communities and Local Government to form a new unified housing and regeneration agency, the Homes and Communities Agency. In 2008 the department along with the Local Government Association produced the National Improvement and Efficiency Strategy which led to the creation of nine Regional Improvement and Efficiency Partnerships (RIEPs) with devolved funding of £185m to drive sector-led improvement for councils.

== Devolution ==
Its main counterparts in the devolved nations of the UK are as follows.

Scotland

- Communities Directorates
- Learning and Justice Directorates

Wales

- Local Government, Housing, Climate Change and Rural Affairs Group

Northern Ireland

- Executive Office (civil resilience, community cohesion, race relations)
- Department for Communities (housing, local government, urban regeneration)
- Department for Infrastructure (planning)
- Department of Finance (building regulations)
- Department of Health (fire and rescue services)

== See also ==
- Budget of the United Kingdom
- Council house
- Energy efficiency in British housing
- Flag protocol
- Homes and Communities Agency
- Local Resilience Forum
- English Partnerships
- Housing Corporation
- Housing estate
- Regions of England
- Social Exclusion Task Force
- Local Government Association
- Regional Improvement and Efficiency Partnership
