= EcoHomes =

Environmental rating scheme for British homes

EcoHomes was an environmental rating scheme for homes in the United Kingdom. It was the domestic version of the Building Research Establishment's Environmental Assessment Method BREEAM, which could also be applied to a variety of non-residential buildings. It was replaced by the Code for Sustainable Homes in April 2008.

EcoHomes Assessments fall under one of four versions, Pre-2002, 2003, 2005 or the final 2006 version. It was not possible to compare homes built under one revision of the standard with homes built under another.

== EcoHomes 2006 ==
In particular, the 2006 version of EcoHomes increased the standards for energy efficiency, following the 2006 revisions energy efficiency requirements of the Building Regulations. It also incorporated a number of other changes.

Under the scheme, credits were first given for standards reached in the following areas:

- Energy
  - Ene 1 – Dwelling Emission Rate
  - Ene 2 – Building fabric
  - Ene 3 – Drying space
  - Ene 4 – Ecolabelled goods
  - Ene 5 – Internal lighting
  - Ene 6 – External lighting
- Transport
  - Tra 1 – Public transport
  - Tra 2 – Cycle storage
  - Tra 3 – Local amenities
  - Tra 4 – Home office
- Pollution
  - Pol 1 – Insulant GWP
  - Pol 2 – NOx emissions
  - Pol 3 – Reduction of surface runoff
  - Pol 4 – Renewable and low emission energy source
  - Pol 5 – Flood risk
- Materials
  - Mat 1 – Environmental impact of materials
  - Mat 2 – Responsible sourcing of materials: basic building elements
  - Mat 3 – Responsible sourcing of materials: finishing elements
  - Mat 4 – Recycling facilities
- Water
  - Wat 1 – Internal potable water use
  - Wat 2 – External potable water use
- Land Use and Ecology
  - Eco 1 – Ecological value of site
  - Eco 2 – Ecological enhancement
  - Eco 3 – Protection of ecological features
  - Eco 4 – Change of ecological value of site
  - Eco 5 – Building Footprint
- Health and Wellbeing
  - Hea 1 – Daylighting
  - Hea 2 – Sound insulation
  - Hea 3 – Private space
- Management
  - Man 1 – Home user guide
  - Man 2 – Considerate constructors
  - Man 3 – Construction site impacts
  - Man 4 – Security

A weighting system is then used to designate the home as Pass, Good, Very Good, or Excellent.

All homes funded by the Housing Corporation or by English Partnerships were required to meet the 2006 Very Good standard. Previously a Good designation sufficed. It was expected that this requirement would be replaced by compliance with the Government's Code for Sustainable Homes.

== Criticisms ==
EcoHomes was criticised by some for getting the balance wrong between the various elements, and for valuing low embodied energy over the whole life performance of the building.

Early versions were criticised for allowing illogical trading-off between areas of the standards, so that, for example, homes with poor energy efficiency standards could still receive a high designation.

== EcoHomes for refurbishment ==
EcoHomes could also be used for major refurbishments such as conversion projects and change of use and was specified for these types of projects, in the interim, whilst the BREEAM Domestic Refurbishment scheme was being developed. Since the start of the Domestic Refurbishment scheme, EcoHomes for Refurbishment registrations ended on 1 July 2012 and for transitional purposes, officially expired on 1 July 2014. This applied to the whole of the UK, including Scotland.

== See also ==
- Association for Environment Conscious Building
- Earthship Biotecture
- Energy efficiency in British housing
- Environmental design
- Geosolar
- Good Homes Alliance
- Green building
- Offgassing
- Sustainable development
- Sustainable design

Compare to-

- LEED in the United States and Canada
