= Gas protection =

Control of gas penetration into properties

Gas protection is the prevention or control of the penetration of hazardous gases into buildings or other types of real property. It usually involves either blocking entry pathways or removing the source of the gas.

== Hazardous gases ==
Methane (which is flammable at 5-15% by volume in air) and carbon dioxide (which is toxic) are the most relevant gases, especially following two gas explosions in the 1980s in Loscoe and Abbeystead, England.

UK regulatory bodies such as Building Research Establishment, British Standards, the Department of Environment, and others in the construction industry have developed and published guidance for preventing such gasses from entering buildings. Their production in the environment is associated with coal seams, deposited river silt, sewage, landfill waste, and peat.

In the case of landfill gas migration, gas is produced by organic materials in the waste degrading over time. Typically 40% carbon dioxide (CO_{2}) and 60% methane (CH_{4}) by volume, this gas can be heavier than air or lighter depending on the concentration (which varies from time to time), but will move from an area of high pressure to one at a lower pressure irrespective of its relative density.

== Usage ==
Systems to prevent gas ingress include a passive barrier or, less commonly, an active system. Passive systems utilize a barrier with low permeability, such as a membrane. Active systems are mostly employed on commercial properties because of the associated costs. There are two main practical types of active systems to prevent the ingress of gases into buildings: positive pressurization, and forced ventilation.

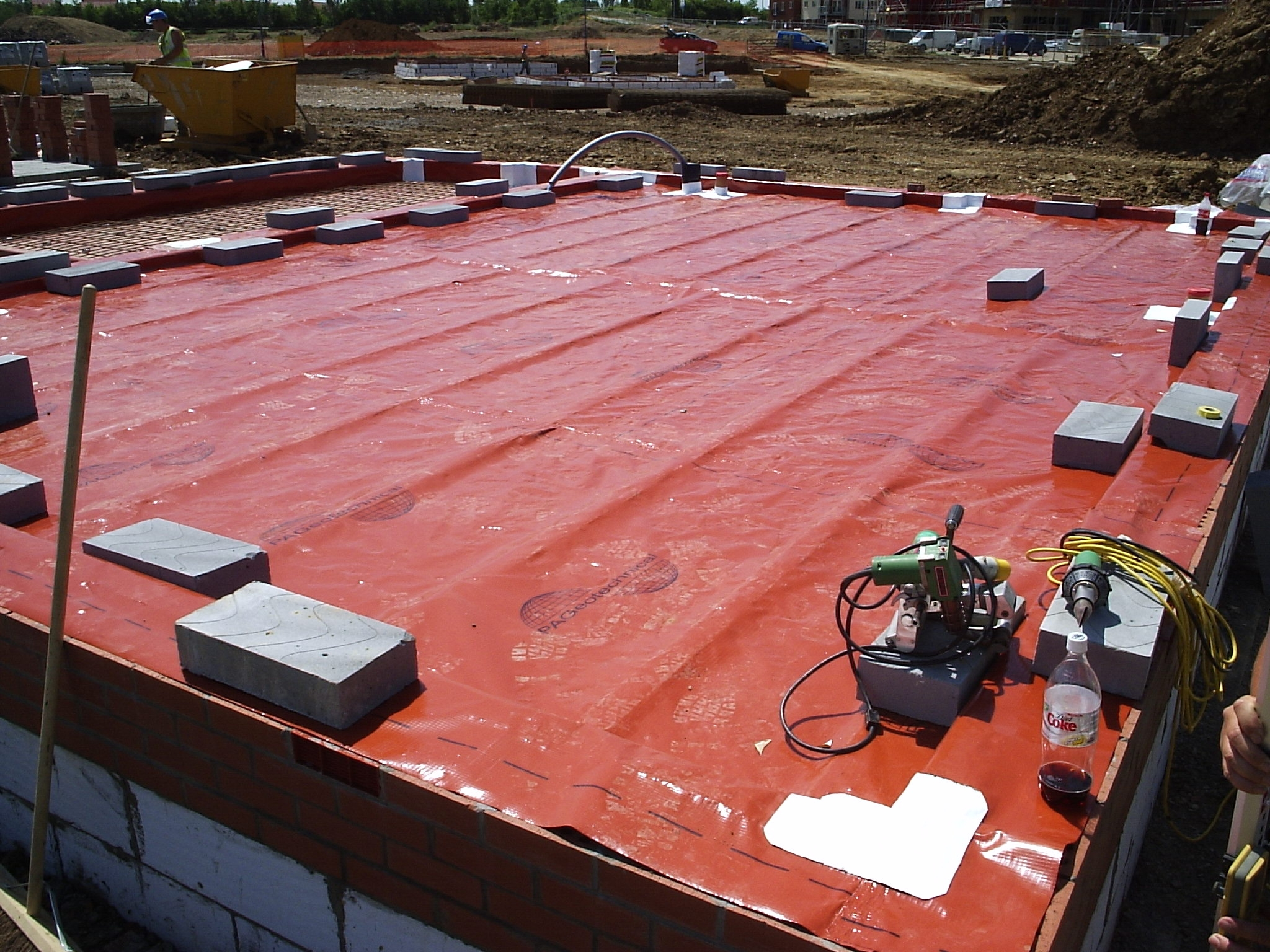
Installed gas membrane - note corner details

== Integrity testing ==
Both passive and active systems require "gas integrity testing", most often using the NHBC traffic light system. This is because the conditions under which gas membranes are installed are often difficult and can adversely compromise the integrity required by the manufacturer or client. The purpose of the test is to ensure integrity and allow the installation to be certified if the method of protection performs correctly.

=== Membrane testing ===
The membrane is tested immediately after installation and prior to being covered up by any following construction processes. The area below the membrane is temporarily pressurized with a mixture of clean air and a non-toxic and inert tracer gas that is sensitive to detection. Special equipment is then used to trace all leaks within the installation, with particular attention being paid to critical points and junctions formed between the membrane material and other structural elements prior to conducting a sweep of the complete area. Any leaks are identified and sealed, and the membrane is re-tested before it passes and the certificate is issued.

=== Active system testing ===
Active systems require a test of the alarm in case of failure of the system or power supply and possible buildup of gas.

== Sources ==
- BS8485.
- Department of the Environment, The control of landfill gas, Waste management paper No 27.
- Department of Environment, Landfill sites development control.
- Guidance on evaluation of development proposals on sites where Methane and Carbon dioxide are present, incorporating Traffic Lights. Rep Ref.10627-R01-(02) Milton Keynes; National House Building Council.
