= Landfill gas monitoring =

Landfill gas monitoring is the process by which gases that are collected or released from landfills are electronically monitored. Landfill gas may be measured as it escapes the landfill ("Surface Monitoring") or may be measured as it is collected and redirected to a power plant or flare ("Collection System Monitoring").

== Techniques for the monitoring of landfill gas ==
Surface monitoring is used to check the integrity of caps on waste and check borehole monitoring. It may give preliminary indications of the migration of gas off-site. The typical regulatory limit of methane is 500 parts per million (ppm) by volume (in California, AB 32 may push this limit down to 200 ppm). In the UK the limit for a final landfill cap is 1×10^{−3} milligrams per square metre per second, and for a temporary cap it is 1×10^{−1} mg/m^{2}/s (as measured using the Environment Agency's "Guidance on Monitoring landfill gas surface emissions" LFTGN 07, EA 2004). Surface monitoring can be broken down into Instantaneous and Integrated. Instantaneous monitoring consists of walking over the surface of the landfill while carrying a flame ionization detector (FID). Integrated monitoring consists of walking over the surface of the landfill while pumping a sample into a bag. The sample is then read with a FID or sent to a lab for full analysis. Integrated regulatory limits tend to be 50 ppm or less.

Gas probes, also known as perimeter or migration probes, are used for subsurface monitoring and detect gas concentrations in the local environment around the probe. Sometimes multiple probes are used at different depths at a single point. Probes typically form a ring around a landfill. The distance between probes varies but rarely exceeds 300 metres. The typical regulatory limit of methane here is 50,000 parts per million (ppm) by volume, or 1% methane and 1.5% carbon dioxide above geological background levels in the UK (see "Guidance on the monitoring of Landfill Gas" LFTGN03, EA 2004).

Ambient air samplers are used to monitor the air around a landfill for excessive amounts of methane and other gases. The principal odoriferous compounds are hydrogen sulfide (which is also toxic) and the majority of a population exposed to more than 5 parts per billion will complain (World Health Organisation : WHO (2000) . Air quality guidelines for Europe, 2nd ed. Copenhagen, World Health Organization Regional Publications, European Series), as well as volatile organic acids.

Monitoring of the landfill gas itself can be used diagnostically. When there is concern regarding the possibility of an ongoing subsurface oxidation event, or landfill fire, the presence in the landfill gas of compounds that are more stable at the high temperatures of such an event (above 500 °C) can be evidence for such a process occurring. The presence of propene, which can be formed from propane at temperatures above several hundred degrees Celsius, supports high temperatures. The presence of elevated concentrations of dihydrogen (H_{2}) in the landfill gas is also consistent with elevated temperatures at remote locations some distance from the gas-extraction well. The presence of H_{2} is consistent with thermal inactivation of CO_{2}-reducing microbes, which normally combine all H_{2} produced by fermentation of organic acids with CO_{2} to form methane (CH_{4}). H_{2}-producing microbes are less temperature-sensitive than CO_{2}-reducing microbes so that elevated temperatures can inactivate them and their recovery can be delayed over the H_{2}-producers. This can result in H_{2} production without the (usually) corresponding consumption, resulting in elevated concentrations of H_{2} in the landfill gas (up to >25%[v:v] at some sites). Thermal deactivation of CO_{2}-reducing microbes has been used to produce CO_{2} (rather than methane) from municipal solid waste (Yu, et al., 2002).

Collection System Monitoring is used to check the characteristics of landfill gas being collected by the gas extraction system. Monitoring may be done either at the individual gas extraction well or at the power plant (or flare). In either case, users are monitoring gas composition (CH_{4}, CO_{2}, O_{2} & Balance Gas) as well as temperature, pressure and flow rate.

== Types of landfill gas monitoring ==
For surface monitoring, a monitor may be either:

- Single reading monitor, giving point readings for landfill gas composition, or a
- Continuous gas monitor that remains in boreholes and gives continuous readings over time for landfill gas composition and production.

For Collection System Monitoring, users are monitoring gas composition (%CH_{4}, %CO_{2}, %O_{2} & Balance Gas) as well as temperature, pressure and flow rate. There are three distinct ways collected gas can be measured.

- Handheld, single reading monitor - giving point readings from individual gas collection wells. Two companies provide the majority of these meters: LANDTEC and Elkins Earthworks.
- Wired, continuous reading monitor - these hard-wired monitors can typically be found at either the flare or the landfill gas-to-energy plant. A number of companies provide wired, continuous-reading monitors.
- Wireless, continuous reading monitor - these wireless monitors can typically be found installed on individual landfill gas collection wells but can be installed anywhere on the gas collection system. Loci Controls is currently the only company that provides wireless, continuous reading monitors.

== Techniques for establishing landfill gas (rather than liquid) as the source of VOC in groundwater samples ==
Several techniques have been developed for evaluating whether landfill gas (rather than leachate) is the source of volatile organic compounds (VOCs) in groundwater samples. Leachate water frequently has elevated levels of tritium compared to background groundwater and a leachate (water) release would increase tritium levels in affected groundwater samples, while landfill gas has been shown not to do so. Although landfill gas components can react with minerals and alter inorganic constituents present in groundwater samples such as alkalinity, calcium, and magnesium, a frequent major leachate constituent, chloride, can be used to evaluate whether leachate has affected the sample.

Highly soluble VOCs, such as MtBE, diethyl ether, and tetrahydrofuran, are evidence of leachate effects, since they are too water-soluble to migrate in landfill gas. The presence of highly soluble semi-volatile organic compounds, such as phenols, are also consistent with leachate effects on the sample. Elevated concentrations of dissolved CO_{2} have been shown to be a symptom of landfill gas effects—this is because not all of the CO_{2} in landfill gas reacts immediately with aquifer minerals, while such reactions are complete in leachate due to the presence of soils as daily cover in the waste. To assess whether VOCs are partitioning into groundwater in a specific location, such as a monitoring well, the headspace gas and dissolved VOC concentrations can be compared. If the Henry's Law constant multiplied by the water concentration is significantly less than the measured gas concentration, the data are consistent with VOCs partitioning from landfill gas into the groundwater.

Typical landfill gas composition	%(dry volume basis)^{a}
Methane, CH_{4}	45-60
Carbon dioxide, CO_{2}	40-60
Nitrogen, N_{2}	2-5
Oxygen, O_{2}	0.1-1.0
Sulfides, disulfides, mercaptans etc.	0-1.0
Ammonia, NH_{3}	0.1-1.0
hydrogen, H_{2}	0-0.2
carbon monoxide, CO	0-0.2
Trace constituents	0.01-0.6

^{a}Exact percentage distribution will vary with the age of the landfill

== Typical problems ==
Most landfills are highly heterogeneous environments, both physically and biologically, and the gas composition sampled can vary radically within a few metres.

Near-surface monitoring is additionally vulnerable over short time periods to weather effects. As the atmospheric pressure rises, the rate of gas escape from the landfill is reduced and may even become negative, with the possibility of oxygen incursion into the upper layers (an analogous effect occurs in the composition of water at the mouth of an estuary as the sea tide rises and falls). Differential diffusion and gas solubility (varying strongly with temperature and pH) further complicates this behaviour. Tunnelling effects, whereby large items (including monitoring boreholes) create bypass shortcuts into the interior of the landfill, can extend this variability to greater depths in localised zones. Such phenomena can give the impression that bioactivity and gas composition is changing much more radically and rapidly than is actually the case, and any series of isolated time-point measurements is likely to be unreliable due to this variance.

Landfill gas often contains significant corrosives such as hydrogen sulphide and sulphur dioxide, and these will shorten the lifespan of most monitoring equipment as they react with moisture (this is also a problem for landfill gas utilization schemes).

Physical settlement as waste decomposes makes borehole monitoring systems vulnerable to breakage as the weight of the material shifts and fractures equipment.

== See also ==
- Anaerobic digestion
- Biogas
- Biodegradability
- Landfill gas migration
- Landfill gas utilization
