= AECB =

AECB may refer to:

- Association for Environment Conscious Building, UK
- Acute exacerbations of chronic bronchitis, a medical condition
- Atomic Energy Control Board, former name of the Canadian Nuclear Safety Commission
