= National House Building Council =

British home warranty and property inspection company

National House Building Council (NHBC)
- Industry: House building, Insurance and warranty, Training, Research
- Founded: 1936
- Headquarters: Milton Keynes, Buckinghamshire, England
- Key people: Alan Rubenstein (Chairman), Paul Turner (Chief Executive Officer), David Campbell (Chief Operating Officer); Directors: Elizabeth Austerberry (Senior Independent Director of the Board), Paul Bishop (Senior Independent Director of the Board), Alison Burns (Non-executive Director of the Board), Tesula Mohindra (Non-executive Director of the Board), Dr Teresa Robson-Capps (Non-executive Director of the Board), Tim Beale (Non-executive Director of the Board), Dame Bernadette Kelly (Non-executive Director of the Board)
- Revenue: ▲Gross revenue £250M GBP (2024/25)
- Number of employees: 1,300+ staff; 600 based in Milton Keynes and London and 750 field and home-based employees across the UK
- Website: www.nhbc.co.uk

The National House Building Council (NHBC), established in 1936, is the UK's largest provider of new home warranties. NHBC is also the UK's largest single Approved Inspector for Building Regulations. Other activities include the provision of services linked to house building and general construction; health and safety, sustainability and training. It also provides industry statistics and benchmarking services.

The NHBC is a non-profit distributing company, so reinvests 'profit' in its activities to improve the quality of new homes to protect the interests of homeowners.

NHBC is authorised and regulated by the Financial Conduct Authority (FCA) and the Prudential Regulation Authority (PRA).

== History ==
NHBC was originally set up as the National House Builders Registration Council (NHBRC) in the United Kingdom in 1936, with the primary purpose to increase the care and professionalism shown by house builders.

As a Registered Housebuilder under the voluntary scheme, houses were inspected during building, buyers were covered by a two-year warranty against major defects, and against the insolvency of the builder. By 1963, 26% of all housing was built by Registered Housebuilders.

In 1964 and 1965, changes were introduced, including the extension of the warranty to ten years. The NHBRC's standards were upgraded in 1967, particularly in the provision of power outlets, kitchen design, and space heating; drawing on the recommendations of the Parker Morris Committee. By the end of 1970, 92% of new homes were built by NHBRC members.

In 1973, the name changed to the National House Building Council (NHBC), and the organisation became completely independent from government and house builders. It was approved by the Department of Trade as an insurance company.

== Services ==
=== New home warranty and build standards ===
The NHBC states that its primary purposes are raising the construction standards of new homes in the United Kingdom (UK), and providing consumer protection for homebuyers through its 10-year Buildmark warranty. NHBC offers warranties for newly built or converted private housing, affordable housing and commercial premises located on mixed use housing schemes. Mortgage lenders in the UK will usually require that a warranty is in place before lending on a newly built property, as detailed in the Council of Mortgage Lenders' handbook. According to NHBC's website, around 70% of new homes built in the UK each year have an NHBC 10-year warranty.

Builders and developers who sell properties with NHBC warranties should adhere to NHBC's guidance documents on construction contained in the NHBC Technical Standards, in addition to complying with Building Regulations in the UK.

NHBC inspectors visit building sites at key stages to check compliance with its Technical Standards. The stages are usually (but can sometimes be more): foundations, drainage, superstructure (e.g. brickwork), pre-plaster, and pre-handover to the buyer. For flats, they also inspect roof construction. The inspection process is not designed to check every detail of the build, but if NHBC is satisfied with the overall build quality they will issue the warranty for the new home/premises. If reportable items are found during the build NHBC may still class as an acceptable risk and pass the build anyway.

'Buildmark', the NHBC warranty for private housing is split into two parts. In the first two years, the builder is responsible for fixing any defects caused by its failure to build to NHBC Technical Standards. If the builder fails to do this, or has gone out of business, NHBC may take responsibility to fix the defect. From the start of the third year, until the home is ten years old, NHBC is responsible for putting right defects to the structural and weather-proofing parts of the home caused by breaches of its Technical Standards but only if 'damage' has occurred.

The NHBC issues a standard form of contract, which may be used to secure the contractual terms between a client and a builder. In the Appeal Court case of Robinson v Jones (2011), the "reasonableness" of certain of its clauses was tested out and they were found to comply with the requirements of the Unfair Contract Terms Act 1977.

=== Building Control ===
In 1985, under the Building Act 1984, the NHBC set up a subsidiary company; NHBC Building Control Services Ltd. It is a Registered Building Control Approver with over 400 Registered Building Inspectors. NHBC delivers its Building Control service to meet the regulator’s new Operational Standard Rules.

=== Industry awards and events ===
NHBC runs a national awards programme, Pride in the Job and a national house building conference called BEYOND LIVE.

=== Other services ===
NHBC offers a range of additional services to help builders comply with Building Regulations, health and safety legislation and other construction rules. These include: Building Control, Construction Quality Services (CQS), Land Quality Service and Data Services

They also offer a wide range of training courses for building professionals, including construction-related National Vocational Qualifications (NVQs) and Apprenticeships that are delivered through a network of training hubs.

NHBC compiles and distributes statistics and analysis about the UK housing market that are used by government and financial institutions, as well as homebuilders. Examples are the Housing Market Report, and the NHBC Quarterly Statistics. Purchasers of new homes are also surveyed, providing statistics about levels of customer satisfaction in their homes.

== Consumer Code for Home Builders ==
NHBC was a founder member of The Consumer Code for Home Builders, which gives added protection and rights to the buyers of brand new homes. The aim of the Code is to ensure that new home buyers are given all the information they need about their new home before they sign contracts, and treated fairly afterwards.

== Criticism ==
The NHBC was criticised on a 2010 edition of the BBC consumer television programme Watchdog, for failing to repair homes due to incorrect surveying of problem properties by relevant professionals, and thus failing to either compensate owners financially or fix any problems promptly, for newly built properties under their warranty.

NHBC apologised to the families featured in the Watchdog programme for any mistakes that were made during the handling of their claims. NHBC argued that the cases showed how complex construction issues can be, and that expert opinions from construction professionals could differ. They also stated that they resolve claims from around 15,000 homeowners each year on homes up to 10 years old, and also help to resolve around 5,000 disputes between homeowners and their builders each year.

In 2010/11, NHBC paid claims totalling £74.4 million.

Further criticism followed in 2017 with the BBC reporting "growing concerns that the quality of homes being built has drastically dropped" and one surveyor concluding that a client's new home was "unfit for habitation" and in places "unsafe". At the time the government was pressuring house developers to target the building 300,000 new homes a year.

== See also ==
- Building regulations in the United Kingdom
- Energy Performance Certificate
- Code for Sustainable Homes
- BREEAM
- EcoHomes
- Energy efficiency in British housing
- UKAS
- Construction Industry Council
- Gas protection
