= Housing in the United Kingdom =

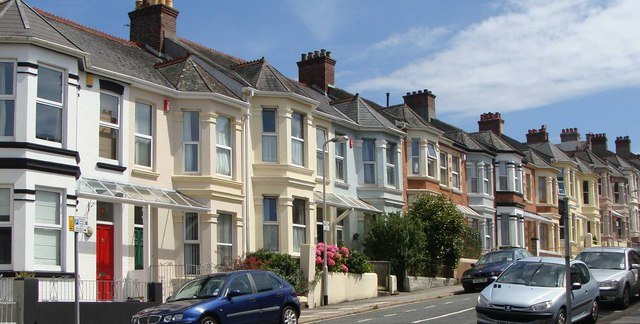
Typical Victorian-era terraced housing in Hampshire

Housing in the United Kingdom represents the largest non-financial asset class in the UK;the overall net value of the UK housing stock remained above £8 trillion in 2024-25, representing a 0.81% increase in the dwelling stock to approximately 25.6 million dwellings in England as of March 2024.This reflects a marginal decrease of 0.3% from the previous year, yet it remains £1.585 trillion higher than levels in 2019, prior to the COVID-19 pandemic.

Housing includes modern and traditional styles. About 30% of homes are owned outright by their occupants, and a further 40% are owner-occupied on a mortgage. Around 18% are social housing of some kind, and the remaining 19% are privately rented.

The UK ranks in the top half in Europe with regard to rooms per person, amenities and quality of housing.

However, the cost of housing as a proportion of income is higher than average amongst European Union (EU) member-states, and the increasing cost of housing in the UK might constitute a housing crisis for many especially in London. As of 2015, over the preceding three decades, house price increases of over fivefold exceeded the average inflation rate of a little above twofold — with housing nationally being typically the larger driver of inflation over the three decades preceding 2022.

Housing and planning decisions are administered by local authorities, but overall come under the jurisdiction of the Minister of State for Housing as part of the Ministry of Housing, Communities and Local Government . (Responsibilities are devolved to corresponding departments in the Scottish Government, the Welsh Government and the Northern Ireland Executive).

== History ==
=== Pre-Victorian era ===
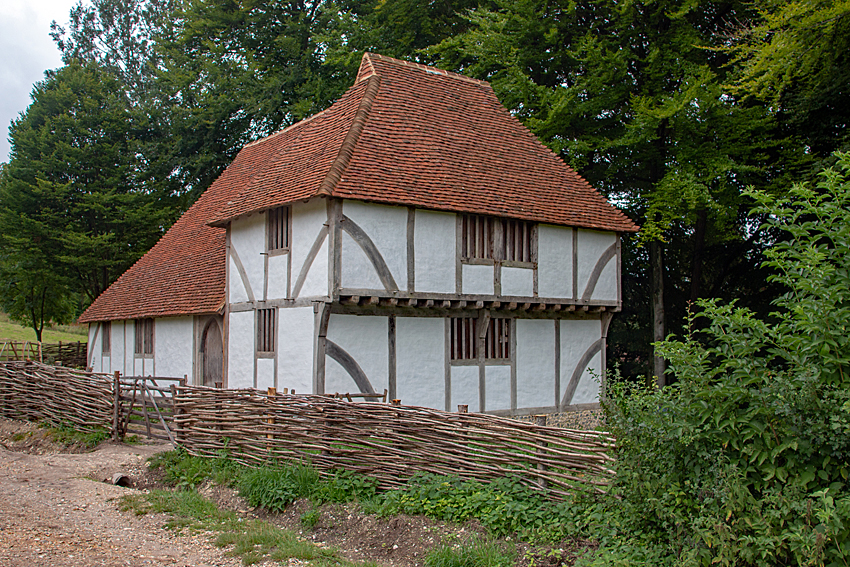
Medieval house using a timber structure

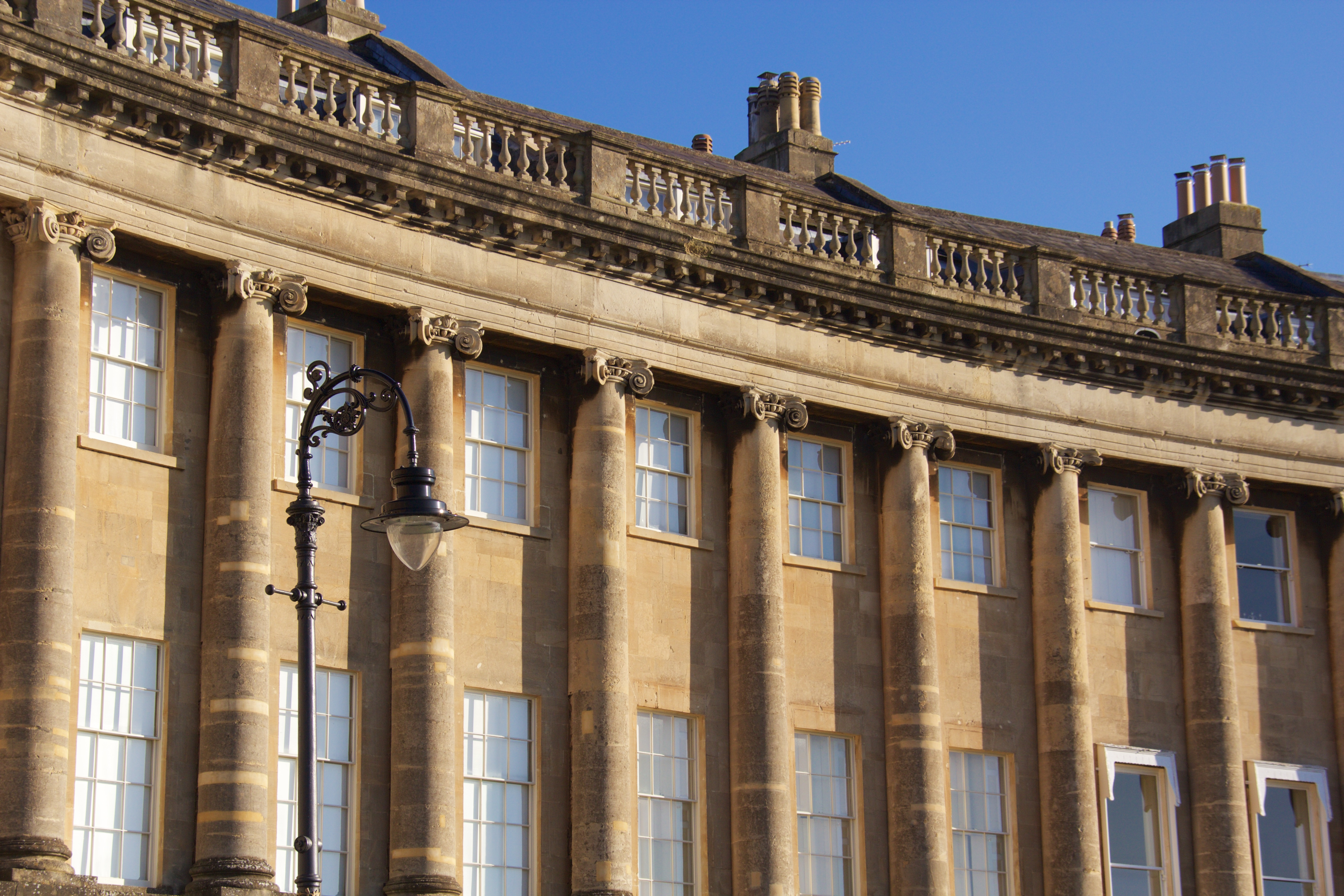
High-end Georgian stone terrace at Royal Crescent, Bath

In the medieval era and early modern period, houses were often built of timber and were heated by fires. (Only the wealthy could afford to live in houses built of stone or brick at this time.) Houses were typically built individually until the advent of town planning in the Georgian era, when terraced houses began to be built.

=== Victorian and Edwardian eras ===
Rapid population growth took place in the nineteenth century during the Industrial Revolution and the Victorian era, particularly terraces in cities with the widespread adoption of mass-produced bricks. The new homes were arranged and funded via building societies that dealt directly with large contracting firms.

Private renting from housing landlords was the dominant tenure. People moved in so rapidly that there was not enough capital to build adequate housing for everyone, so low-income newcomers squeezed into increasingly overcrowded slums. Clean water, sanitation and public health facilities were inadequate; the death rate was high, especially infant mortality, and tuberculosis among young adults. Despite this, house prices actually fell for seventy years from the 1840s due to the expansion of the railway network which made it attractive to build on land that had previously been very distant from urban centres.

The stock of houses expanded from around 1.6 million in 1801 to 7.6 million by 1911 (and, specifically, by nearly 5 million between 1870 and 1914, an average of around 110,000 per year), but there was a disproportionate focus on building houses for the middle and upper classes, hence the frequent poor conditions experience by the lower classes referenced above.

=== Inter-war years of 1919—1939 ===
The rapid expansion of housing was a major success story of the interwar period, 1919–1939. The total housing stock in England and Wales was 7,600,000 in 1911; 8,000,000 in 1921; 9,400,000 in 1931; and 11,300,000 in 1939, an average construction rate of over 180,000 houses per year between 1921 and 1939. This growth was in stark contrast to the United States, where the construction of new housing practically collapsed after 1929, and France, where strict rent controls imposed in 1914 meant the housing stock expanded only from 9.5 million that year to 9.75 million by 1939, of which nearly a third were declared unfit for human habitation.

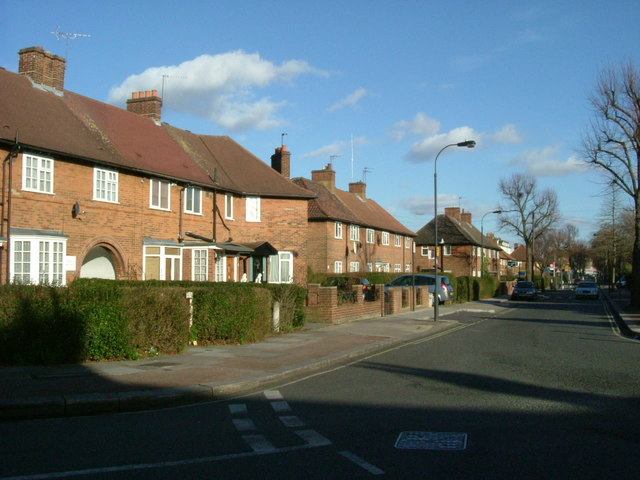
The Wormholt Estate is typical of 'cottage' interwar housing - brick walls, tiled roofs, low rise with front and rear gardens.

==== Renting ====
The private rent market provided 90% of the housing before the First World War. Now it came under heavy pressure regarding rent controls, and the inability of owners to evict tenants, except for non-payment of rent. The tenants had a friend in David Lloyd George of the Liberal Party, prime minister from 1916 to 1922, and especially in the increasingly powerful Labour Party. The private rent sector went into a prolonged decline and never recovered; by 1938, it covered only 58% of the housing stock.

A decisive change in policy was marked by the Tudor Walters Report of 1918; it set the standards for council house design and location for the next ninety years. It recommended housing in short terraces, spaced at 70 feet (21 m) at a density of twelve to the acre. With the Housing, Town Planning, &c. Act 1919 Lloyd George set up a system of government housing that followed his 1918 general election campaign promise of "homes fit for heroes."

It required local authorities to survey their housing needs, and start building houses to replace slums. The treasury subsidised the low rents. The immediate impact was the prevalence of the three-bedroom house, with kitchen, bathroom, parlour, electric lighting and gas cooking, often built as subsidised council housing. Major cities such as London and Birmingham built large-scale housing estates; one in Birmingham had a population of 30,000. They were built in blocks of two or four using brick or stucco, with two storeys.

They were set back from curving streets; each had a long garden. Shopping centres, churches and pubs sprang up nearby. Eventually the city would provide community centres, schools and public libraries. The residents typically were the upper fifth stratum of the working class. The largest of these two communities was Becontree in the outer suburbs of London, where construction began in 1921, and by 1932 there were 22,000 houses holding 103,000 residents. Slum clearance now moved from being a public health matter to one of town planning.

Tudor Walters, a Liberal Party member of Parliament (MP), was inspired by the garden city movement, calling for spacious low-density developments and semi-detached houses built to a high construction standard. Older women could now vote. Local politicians consulted with them and, in response, put more emphasis on such amenities as communal laundromats, extra bedrooms, indoor lavatories, running hot water, separate parlours to demonstrate their respectability and practical vegetable gardens rather than manicured yards.

The housewives had had their fill of chamber pots. Progress was not automatic, as shown by the troubles of rural Norfolk. Many dreams were shattered as local authorities had to renege on promises they could not fulfil due to undue haste, impossible national deadlines, debilitating bureaucracy, lack of lumber, rising costs, and the unaffordability of rents by the rural poor.

In England and Wales, 214,000 multi-unit council buildings were built by 1939; making the Ministry of Health largely a ministry of housing. Council housing accounted for 10% of the housing stock in the UK by 1938, peaking at 32% in 1980, and dropping to 18% by 1996, where it held steady for the next two decades.

In 2025, England has approximately 4.5 million social homes. However, demand remains at record levels with 1.33 million households on local authority waiting lists in 2024, the highest number since 2014.

As of 2025, there were 309,856 long-term empty homes in England, a 13% increase from the previous year. A coalition of housing organisations including Shelter and the Empty Homes Network wrote to the Housing Minister in February 2026 calling for a national empty homes strategy.

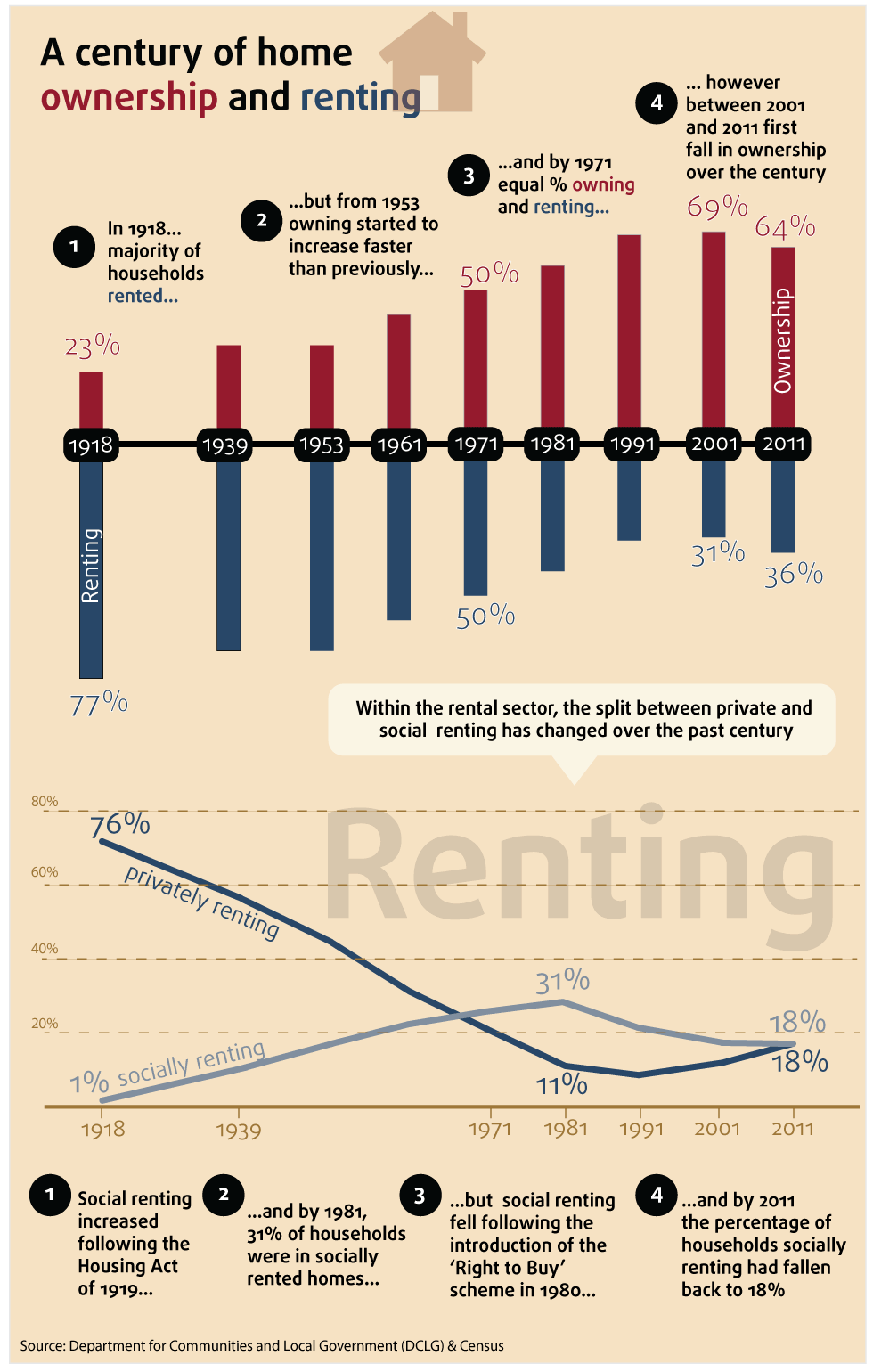
Statistics of home ownership and renting in England and Wales (1918-2011)

==== Debates on high-rise housing ====
The fierce debates over high-rise housing that took place after 1945 were presaged by an acrimonious debate in the 1920s and 1930s in London. On the political left there was firm opposition to what were denounced as "barracks for the working-classes". Reformers on the right called for multi-storey solutions to overcrowding and high rents.

There were attempts at compromise by developing new solutions to urban living, focused especially on slum clearance and redevelopment schemes. The compromises generally sought to replace inhospitable slums with high-rise blocks served by lifts. In the Metropolitan Borough of Stepney they included John Scurr House (built 1936–1937), Riverside Mansions (1925–1928) and the Limehouse Fields project (1925 but never built).

==== Ownership ====
Increasingly the British ideal was home ownership, even among the working class. Rates of home ownership rose steadily from 15% of people owning their own home before 1914, to 32% by 1938, and 67% by 1996. Home ownership peaked at 71% in 2003 before falling to 64% by 2022, reflecting rising house prices and deposit requirements. The construction industry sold the idea of home ownership to upscale renters. The mortgage lost its old stigma of a millstone round one’s neck to instead be seen as a valuable long-term investment in suburbanised Britain.

It appealed to aspirations of upward mobility and made possible the fastest rate of growth in working-class owner-occupation during the 20th century. The boom was largely financed by the savings ordinary Britons put into their building societies. Starting in the 1920s favourable tax policies encouraged substantial investment in the societies, creating huge reserves for lending. Beginning in 1927, the societies encouraged borrowing through gradual liberalisation of mortgage terms.

=== Post War ===
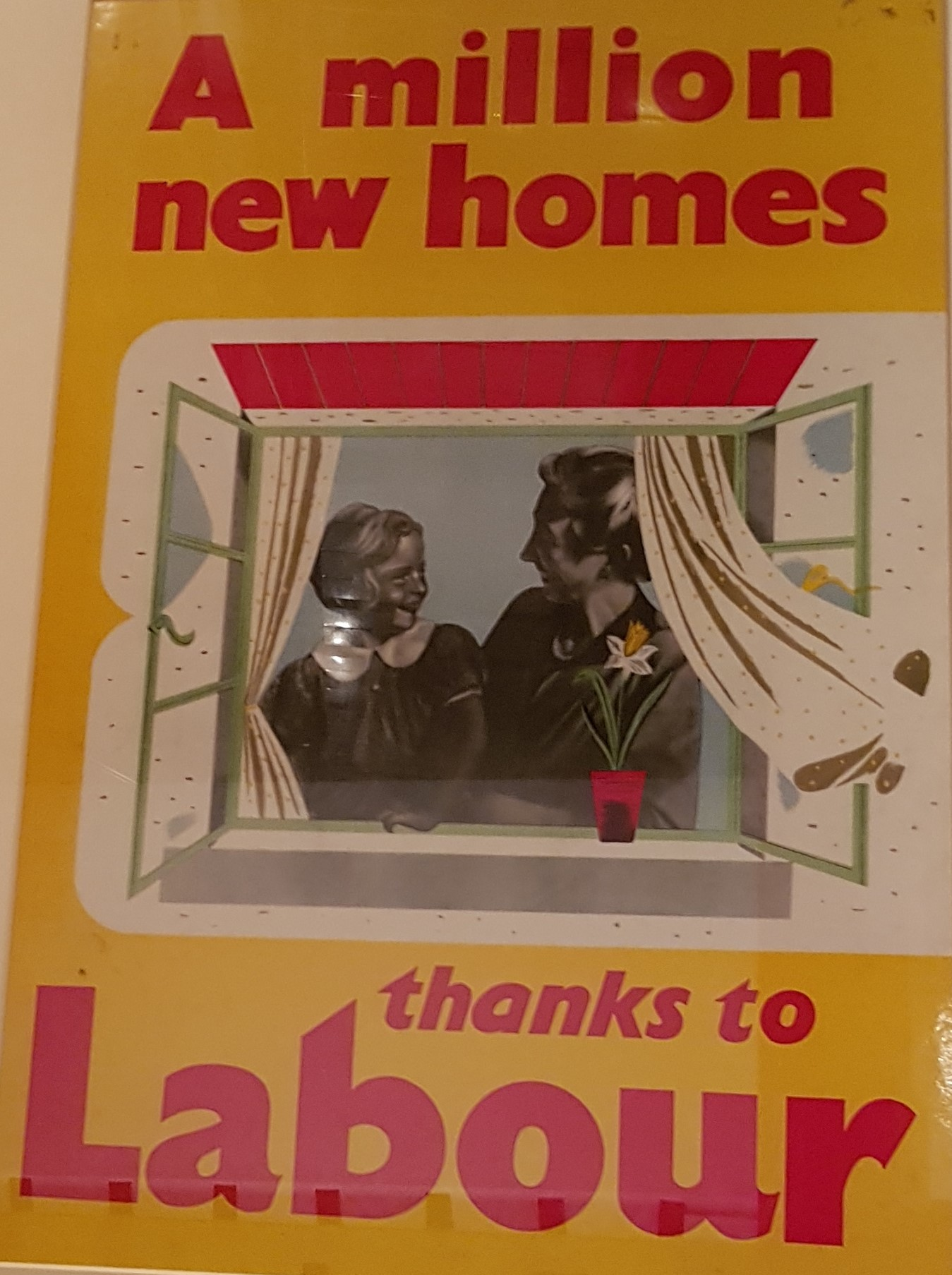
Political poster: ″A million new homes thanks to Labour″

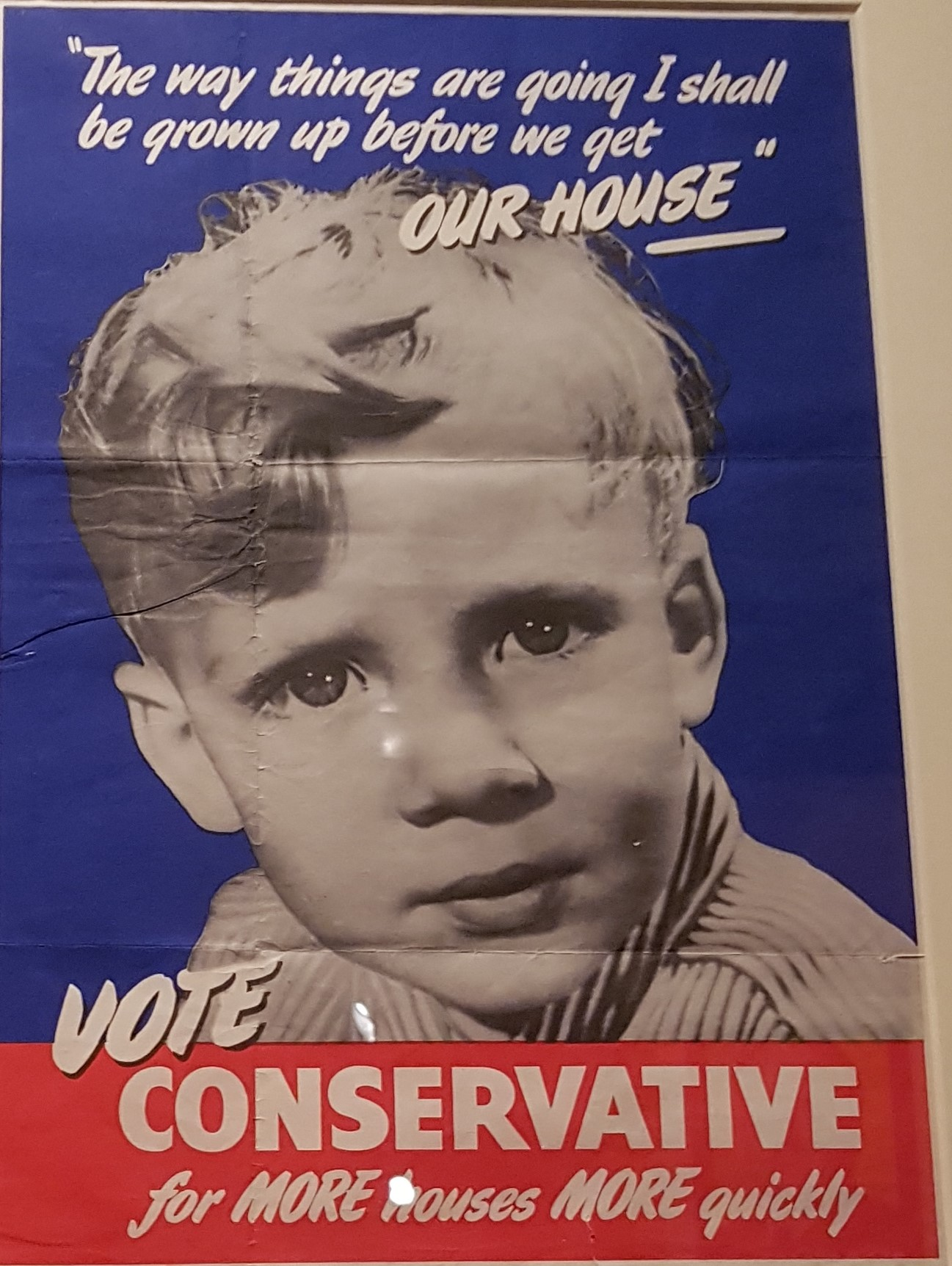
Political poster: ″The way things are going I shall be grown up before we get our house. Vote Conservative for more houses more quickly.″

Housing was a critical shortage in the post-war era. Air raids had destroyed half a million housing units; repairs and maintenance on undamaged homes had been postponed. 3,000,000 new dwellings were needed. The government aimed for 300,000 to be built annually, compared to the maximum pre-war rate of 350,000.

However, there were shortages of builders, materials, and funding. The Ministry of Works undertook the publication of a set of Post War Building Studies, that established technical guidelines for the use of new or modernised building materials. Not counting 150,000 temporary prefabricated units, the nation was still 1,500,000 units short by 1951. Legislation kept rents down, but did not affect purchased houses. The ambitions of the New Towns Act 1946 (9 & 10 Geo. 6. c. 68) project were idealistic, but did not provide enough urgently needed units.

When the Conservative Party returned to power in 1951, they made housing a high priority and oversaw 2,500,000 new units, two-thirds of them through local councils. Haste made for dubious quality, and policy increasingly shifted toward renovation rather than new builds. Slums were cleared, opening the way for gentrification in the inner cities.

According to a 2018 study in The Economic History Review, the "stop-go" macroeconomic policy framework adopted by HM Treasury and the Bank of England from the mid-1950s to the early 1980s restricted house-building during the period.

=== 1980s onwards ===
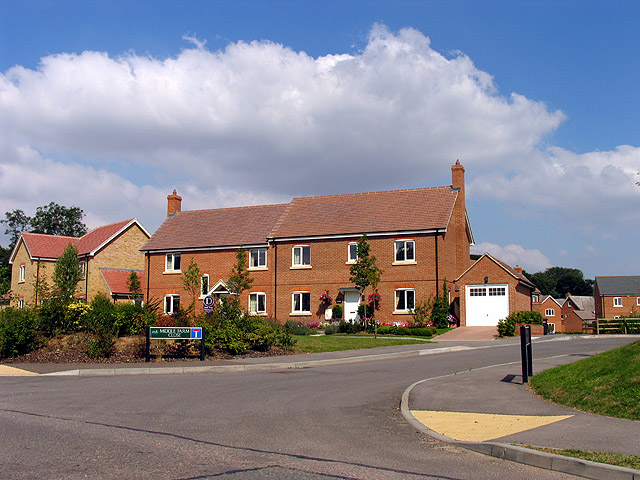
Modern housing estate in Berkshire blending traditional brick with modern PVC windows and dedicated car garages

Working-class families proved eager to purchase their council homes when the first Thatcher ministry introduced the "Right to Buy" scheme in 1980, alongside restricting the construction of new council houses. Consequently, most housing was built by private developers of which the largest included George Wimpey, Barratt Developments and Redrow plc. Timber frames were used instead of masonry structures, although brick remained common as a facing material.

For energy efficiency, PVC doors and windows replaced the use of wood and cavity wall insulation became compulsory. Developments typically provided for car parking which had historically taken place on street.

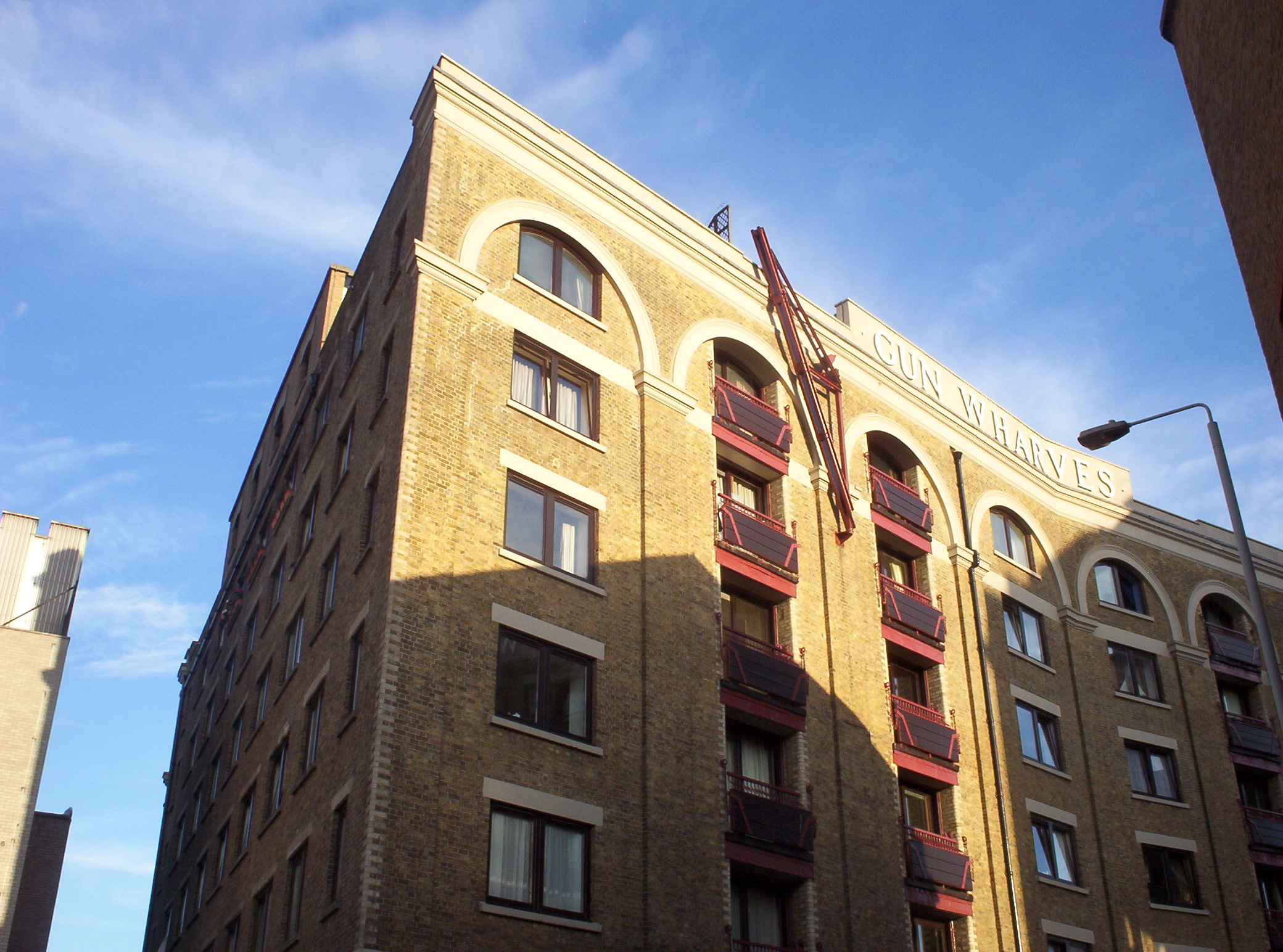
Gun Wharves, Wapping, was converted from a warehouse to flats.

At the same time urban renewal schemes resulted in the conversion of disused industrial buildings such as warehouses to apartments. Examples include Rotherhithe and Wapping alongside the Thames in London and the Albert Dock in Liverpool. There was also widespread construction of purpose-built apartment blocks including Wembley Park and Stratford in London, Salford Quays and Beetham Tower in Manchester.

The private rented sector expanded significantly following the Housing Act 1988, which introduced assured shorthold tenancies and deregulated rents. By 2025, the sector housed approximately 19% of households in England, up from 10% in 1991. As of February 2026, average UK monthly private rents stood at £1,374, up 3.5% year-on-year, with significant regional variation: £1,430 in England, £1,022 in Scotland, and £828 in Wales.

== Demography ==
There are approximately 23 million dwellings in England and some 27 million across the UK. In 2009, about 30% of homes were owned outright by their occupants, and a further 40% were owner-occupied on a mortgage. About 18% are social housing of some kind, and the remaining 12% are privately rented. The overall mean number of bedrooms is approximately 2.8. Just under 40% of households have at least two spare bedrooms. 20% of dwellings were built before 1919 and 15% were built post 1990. 29% of all dwellings are terraced, 42% are detached or semi-detached and the remaining 29% are bungalows or flats. The mean floor area is 95 square metres.

Approximately 4% of all dwellings were vacant. Approximately 385,000 households reported a fire between 2012 and 2014, the majority of which were caused by cooking. In 2014, 2.6 million households moved dwelling, the majority of which (74%) were renters.

== Supply and construction ==
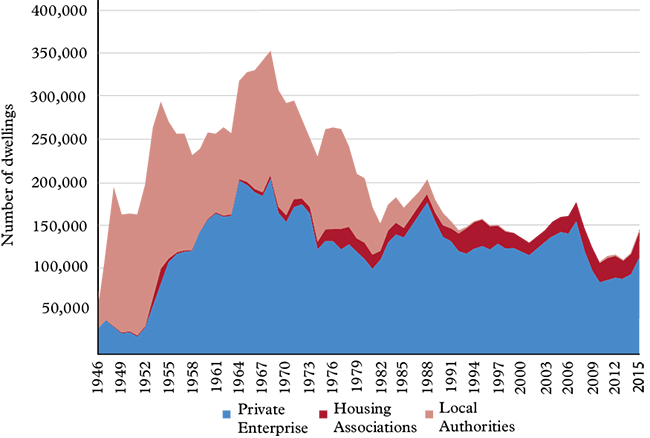
Dwellings built in England, 1946-2015

The Labour government suspected that there might be supply-side problems in the construction sector, and in 2006 commissioned the Callcutt Review of House Building Delivery, which was published in 2007. The Callcutt report noted the failure of the home building industry to increase the supply in response to price signals. There was a fall in the numbers of house completions after the 2008 recession, but by 2015 it was back up to 169,000.

According to the Centre for Ageing Better 21% of homes in the UK were built before 1919, 38% before 1946, and only 7% after 2000, making the British housing stock older than any European Union countries.

Local planning authorities are required to continuously maintain sufficient land to meet housing needs for five years. It is estimated 250,000 new homes are needed each year just to keep up with the demand of the UK's continually growing population.

== Purchase price of a dwelling ==
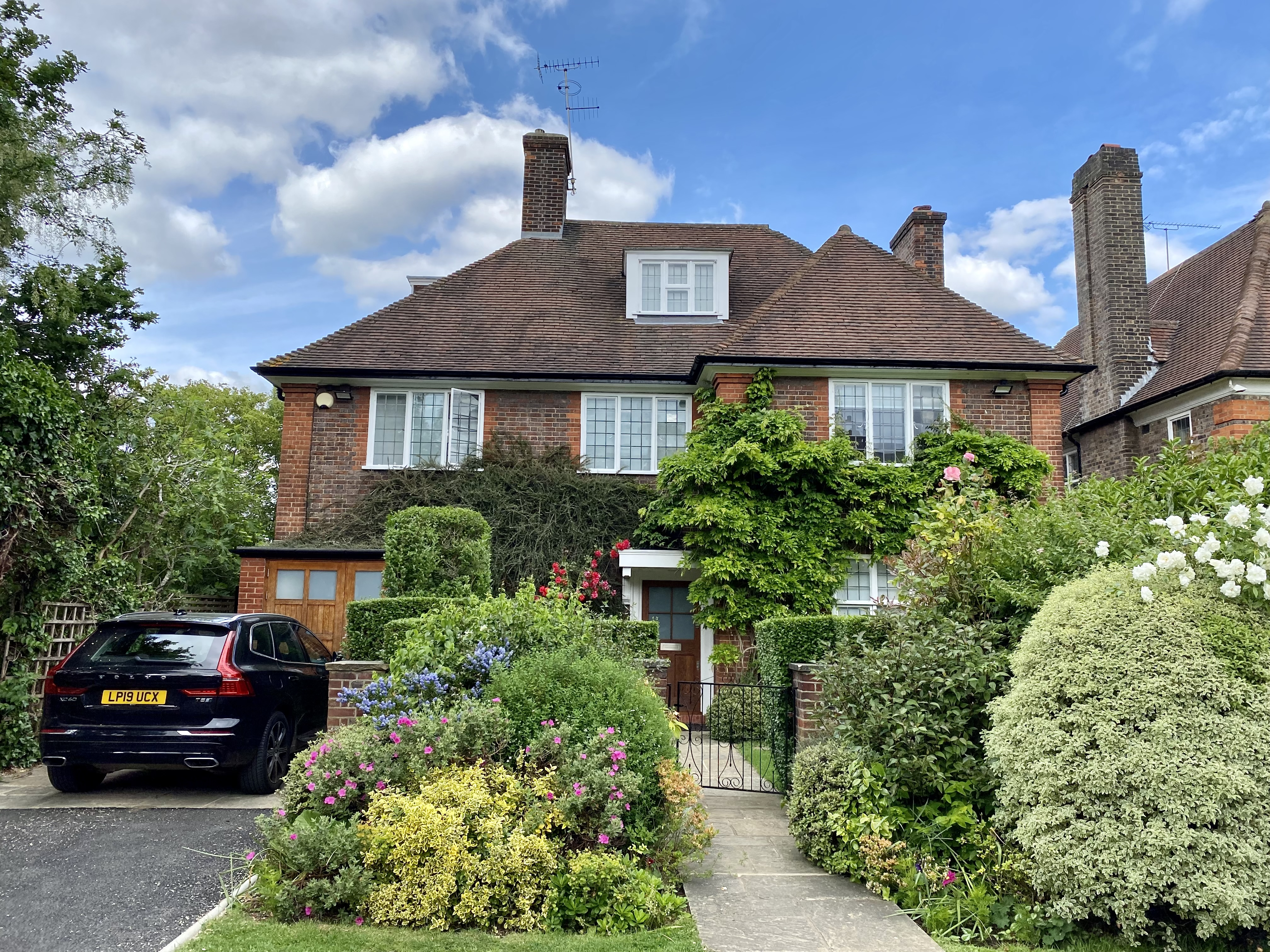
A house in Hampstead Garden Suburb, London

After adjusting for inflation, the average cost of a home increased by a factor of 3.4 between 1950 and 2012.

As of January 2026, the average UK house price stands at £269,800, marking a 1.2% increase over the previous year. While prices in the North West grew by 3.5% in 2025, London saw a decline of 0.7% due to affordability pressures.

- Detached: £378,473
- Semi-detached: £230,284
- Terraced: £200,889
- Flat/maisonette: £230,603

London is ranked as the top city in the world in terms of the number of ultra high net worth individuals who are resident in a city. The consequence of this is seen in the high price for top-end dwellings. The most expensive home ever sold in the UK was 2–8a Rutland Gate in Knightsbridge, London, which sold for £280 million in 2015. The most expensive street in the UK is Kensington Palace Gardens, London, where the average price of a home is approximately £42 million.

A report for Wandsworth Borough Council found that overseas investors had a positive effect on housing affordability, both in bringing forward new homes in general and allowing the affordable housing part of schemes to be brought forward more quickly. They also found that there was very little evidence of housing being left empty. Dwellings represent the largest non-financial asset in the British balance sheet, with a net worth of £5.1 trillion (2014). In the national statistics rising house prices are regarded as adding to gross domestic product and thus a cause of economic growth.

== Renting ==
Nearly two out of five households rent their home. However, the supply of rental properties has been declining since 2016 when the taxation treatment of rental property turned against landlords. Prior to the Rent Reform Act (see below) nearly all dwellings were let using assured shorthold tenancy agreements. For the initial period, typically six months or a year, neither side was able terminate the agreement. After this period landlords were able to terminate the agreement at two months' notice.

Council Tax is paid by the occupier of the home unless it is a house in multiple occupation (HMO) when the landlord is liable. In London, rents are double the national average, meaning that living in London has become a luxury good. People on median incomes who work in central London often live in the outer suburbs of London and the commuting towns of South East England.

In the 12 months to January 2026, average UK monthly private rents increased by 3.5% to reach £1,367. England saw an average rent of £1,423, with the highest inflation in the North East at 8.0%, marking the first time this has occurred since 2010. In Wales renting is 15.8% more economical than owning a mortgaged property. However, in Scotland, owning a property with a mortgage is 5.5% more cost-effective than renting, and in Northern Ireland, it is 7.3% more advantageous to own a mortgaged property compared to renting.

=== Renters' Rights Act ===
The Renters' Rights Act 2025, which is a revised version of reforms originally proposed by the previous government, received Royal Assent on 27 October 2025. Its primary reforms, including the abolition of Section 21 'no-fault' evictions and the transition of all tenancies to periodic (rolling) contracts, took effect from 1 May 2026. The Act:

- Abolishes section 21 "no fault" evictions and moves to a tenancy structure where all assured tenancies will be periodic;
- Strengthens protections against eviction and introduces a rent tribunal;
- Introduces a new Private Rented Sector Ombudsman;
- Creates a new Private Rented Sector Database;
- Gives tenants the right to request a pet in the property, which the landlord must consider and cannot unreasonably refuse;
- Applies the Decent Homes Standard to the private rented sector;
- Makes it illegal for landlords and agents to discriminate against tenants on benefits or who have children;
- Ends the practice of rental bidding; and
- Strengthens enforcement, increases penalties on delinquent landlords, and strengthens rent repayment orders.

== Homelessness ==
In 2018 around 320,000 people were homeless in the UK, including children.

== Housing quality ==
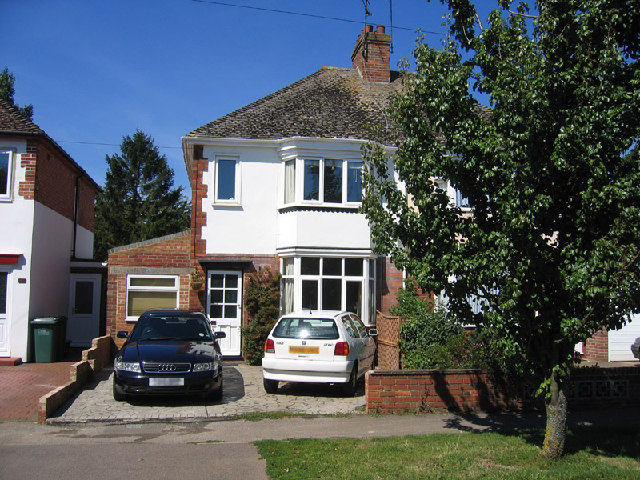
A semi-detached house in Oxfordshire

The United Kingdom ranks highly in Europe with regard to rooms per person, amenities and quality of housing.

The housing shortage manifests itself in overcrowding rather than homelessness. Overcrowding is especially acute in London. In 2011 it was estimated that there were 391,000 children in London living in overcrowded conditions.

Between 1995–1996 and 2013–2014 overcrowding, as measured by the bedroom standard increased from 63,000 households to 218,000 households. The bedroom standard understates overcrowding. It does not include potential household units forced to live in the same dwelling. For example, divorced couples living in the same dwelling, adult children being unable to form own household but having to live with their parents. A report issued in 2004 reviewed the evidence that overcrowding, in addition to the known impacts on physical health, adversely affects mental health and child development.

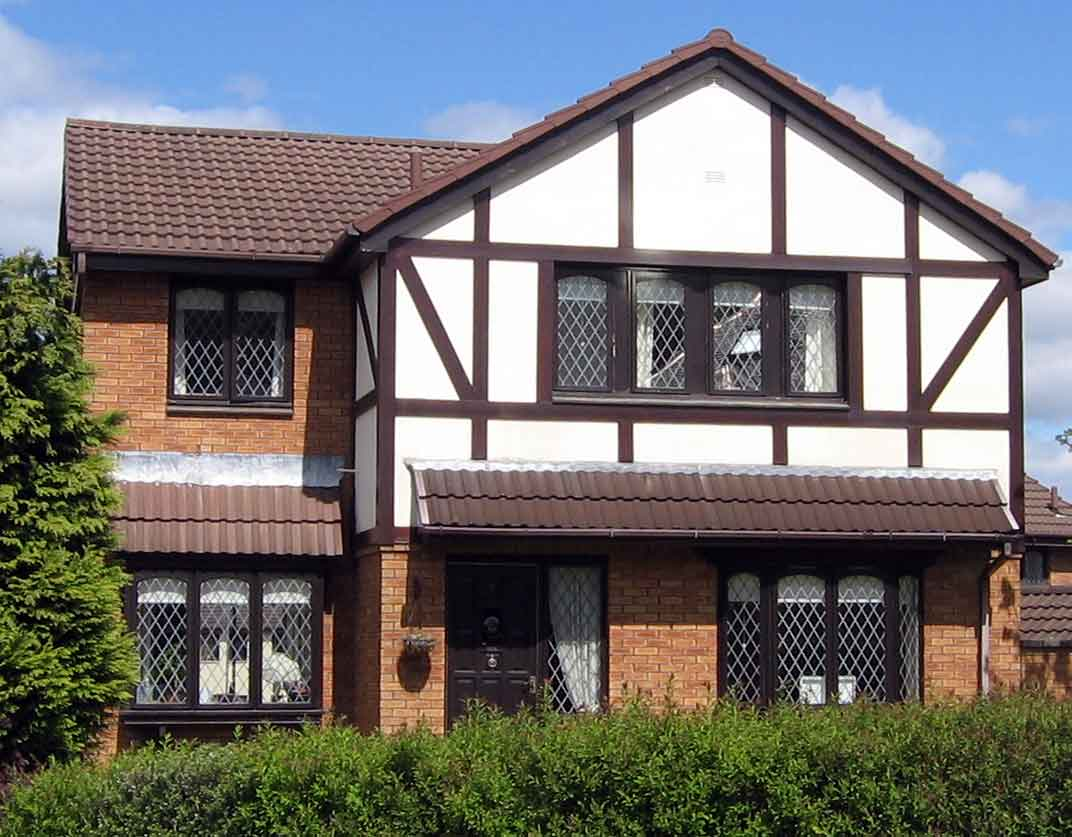
A 21st-century detached Mock Tudor house. Its timber framing is typical of English Tudor architecture.

It is useful to consider housing quality under two sub-headings: physical and social. In the era of Beveridge Consensus there were large-scale slum clearance projects. Council environmental health officers inspected dwellings in a borough and those which failed to meet standards were compulsorily purchased for a nominal sum and demolished. New dwellings were built to rehouse the slum dwellers. Slum clearance significantly improved the physical quality of the British housing stock. But in a seminal study Family and Kinship in East London it was found that although the physical quality of the housing had improved, its social quality had deteriorated. The residents of apartments in tower blocks appreciated their clean, warm, bright new apartments, but missed the supportive community networks of the slums.

The overall quality of English housing stock improved over the thirty years 1985 to 2015, however, the quality of housing for new households varies.

The Building Better, Building Beautiful Commission was an independent body that advised the Ministry of Housing, Communities and Local Government on how to promote and increase the use of high-quality design for new build homes and neighbourhoods in the United Kingdom. The research was conducted on behalf of the Commission, and the findings have informed the recommendations in the report. It supports the creation of more beautiful, greener communities. The commission had 3 primary aims:

1. To promote better design and style of homes, villages, towns and high streets, to reflect what communities want, building on the knowledge and tradition of what they know works for their area.
2. To explore how new settlements can be developed with greater community consent.
3. To make the planning system work in support of better design and style, not against it.

== Energy efficiency ==
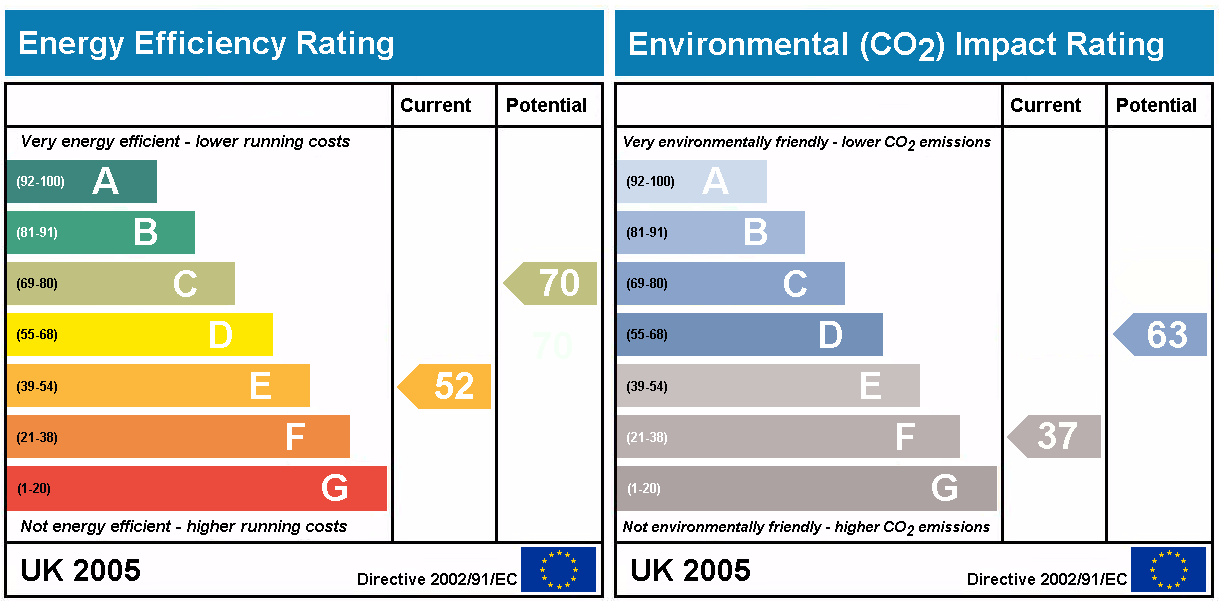
British Home Performance chart

There is a particular problem with dwellings built before the First World War, which are now over one hundred years old. The terraced houses of this period, built for sale to the buy-to-let investors of the time, are particularly difficult to insulate. These dwellings were built for heating by open coal fires, and had large windows to allow the fire to draw.

They have very small rooms and have solid walls with a single leaf of bricks. This structure makes wall insulation expensive and in many cases impractical. Many of the dwellings of this type were replaced by council houses in the post war slum clearance program, but with the ending of public sector building of dwellings this route for improving the energy efficient of the housing stock ended.

There also insulation problems in the pre-1914 large houses built for the top decile of the time. These houses were built with servant quarters in the roof space. Most such houses have been converted into blocks of flats and sold to buy to let investors.

These flats are difficult to insulate, especial the top floor flat in the roof space. The expense of insulation means that it is often not cost effective for the landlord to insulate such dwellings. This is especially true in London, where due to the housing crisis, landlords can let a property in poor condition, and consequently improving the energy efficiency of a dwelling is not a priority for buy to let investors.

The Green Deal provided low-interest loans for energy efficiency improvements to the energy bills of the properties the upgrades are performed on. These debts are passed onto new occupiers when they take over the payment of energy bills. It was intended that the costs of the loan repayments should be less than the savings on the bills from the upgrades. The scheme was a failure and was scrapped in 2015.

== Empty homes ==
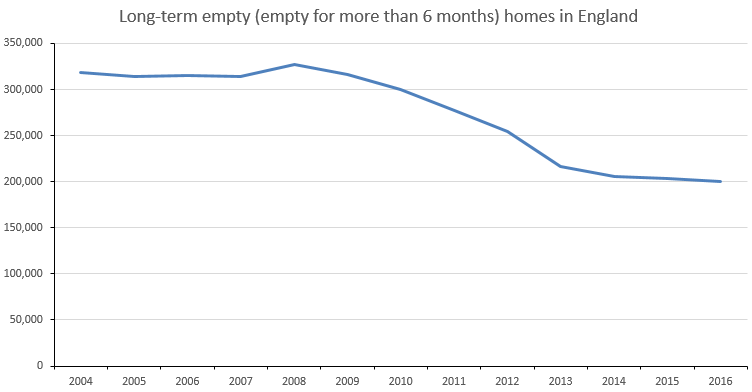
Number of dwellings in England that have been empty for more than six months (2003–2016)

According to official statistics, in October 2015, there were 600,179 vacant dwellings in England, a decline from the 610,123 from a year earlier. Of these vacant dwellings, 203,596 were vacant for more than six months. This, it is believed, is mainly due to financial reasons, such as the owner being unable to sell the house or raise enough money to renovate the property. In November 2017, the government allowed councils to charge a 100% council tax premium on empty homes.

According to official statistics, the percentage of empty homes in England fell from 3.5% in 2008 to 2.6% in 2014. One explanation for this housing transactions have picked up since the financial crisis, and because of government efforts to reduce the number of empty homes.

An alternative explanation is that before April 2013 there was an incentive for property owners to report a property as empty, as there was a rebate on council tax for vacant property. And when this incentive was removed, property owners ceased informing the council that their property was empty, and this led to an apparent fall in empty homes reported by official statistics.

The number of empty homes includes homes where the previous occupier is in prison, in care, in hospital or recently deceased. The charity Empty Homes argued that empty homes were helping contribute to the housing crisis, saying in a report "The longer a property is empty the more our housing assets are being wasted. Also, the longer a property lies empty, the more likely it is to deteriorate; the more it is likely to cost to bring back into use; and the more it is likely to be seen as a blight by the neighbours."

=== Long-term empty homes ===
In 2016 there were around 200,000 empty homes in the UK, down from 300,000 in 2010. Empty Dwelling Management Orders (EMDOs) allow councils to take over the management of long-term empty properties but these are generally seen as a last resort and only 43 EDMOs were successful from 2006 to 2011.

Government statistics show that long-term empty homes are generally concentrated post-industrial areas, in the North of England and in seaside towns, where property prices are generally lower, with the lowest percentage in London, which had 20,795 long-term empty properties, with the highest in Barrow-in Furness, Burley and Blackburn.

As of 2015 around 1.7% of homes in London were empty, a historically low level. The vacancy rate is much lower for London's private sector housing compared to the rest of the country, whereas the rates for affordable housing are "broadly similar". Research by Islington Council revealed that nearly a third of new dwellings built did not have anyone on the electoral register after six years, although this may exclude students and foreign tenants.

The Observer reported on what has been termed "lights out London", where "absentee owners push up property prices without contributing to the local economy." According to a local restaurateur, "my original customers [have sold to] non-doms who do not live in their [property]. In some apartment blocks 20% were unoccupied... It makes a big difference [to my business]."

Research by the London School of Economics for the Mayor of London found that there was almost no evidence of new-build units being left empty, "certainly less than 1%", and that the "vast majority" of overseas buyers intended to live in the property or rent it out.

== Housing cooperatives ==
Housing co-operatives are uncommon in the UK, making up about 0.1% of housing stock.

Most are based in urban areas and consist of affordable shared accommodation where the members look after the property themselves. Waiting lists can be very long due to the rarity of housing co-operatives. In some areas the application procedure is integrated into the council housing application system. The laws differ between England and Scotland. The Confederation of Co-operative Housing provides information on housing cooperatives in the United Kingdom and has published a guide on setting them up. The Shelter website provides information on housing and has information specific to England and Scotland.

The Catalyst Collective provides information about starting co-operatives in the UK and explains the legal structure of a housing coop. Radical Routes offers a guide on how to set up a housing co-operative.

== See also ==
- Homes England
- Building regulations in the United Kingdom
- Cost of moving in the United Kingdom
- English land law
- HM Land Registry
- Mortgage industry of the United Kingdom
- Public housing in the United Kingdom
- Real estate in the United Kingdom
