= Code for Sustainable Homes =

UK environmental assessment method

The Code for Sustainable Homes was an environmental assessment method for rating and certifying the performance of new homes in United Kingdom. First introduced in 2006, it is a national standard for use in the design and construction of new homes with a view to encouraging continuous improvement in sustainable home building. In 2015 the Government in England withdrew it, consolidating some standards into Building Regulations.

== History ==
The Code was officially launched in December 2006, and was introduced as a voluntary standard in England in 2007. It complemented the system of Energy Performance Certificates for new homes introduced in 2008 under the European Energy Performance of Buildings Directive, and built on recent changes to Building Regulations in England and Wales.

The Government-owned scheme was a successor to the BRE EcoHomes scheme first used in 2000. BRE managed and developed the technical contents of the Code standard for and on behalf of the Department of Communities and Local Government (DCLG).

In 2015 with the winding down of the Government-owned Code for Sustainable Homes in England BRE launched the new consumer facing scheme the Home Quality Mark in England, Wales, Scotland and Northern Ireland.

== Description ==
The Code works by awarding new homes a rating from Level 1 to Level 6, based on their performance against nine sustainability criteria which are combined to assess the overall environmental impact. Level 1 was entry level above building regulations, and Level six is the highest, reflecting exemplary developments in terms of sustainability.

The sustainability criteria by which new homes are measured are:

- Energy and CO_{2} emissions – Operational Energy and resulting emissions of carbon dioxide to the atmosphere (different minimum standards that must be met at each level of the Code)
- Water – Internal and external water saving measures specified (minimum standards that must be met at each level of the Code).
- Materials – The sourcing and environmental impact of materials used to build the home (minimum standards present).
- Surface water run-off – Management of surface water run-off from the development and flood risk (minimum standards present).
- Waste – Storage for recyclable waste and compost, and care taken to reduce, reuse and recycle construction materials (minimum standards present).
- Pollution – The use of insulation materials and heating systems that do not add to global warming.
- Health and well-being – Provision of good daylight quality, sound insulation, private space, accessibility, and adaptability (minimum standards present for Code Level 6 only).
- Management – A Home User Guide, designing in security, and reducing the impact of construction.
- Ecology – Protection and enhancement of the ecology of the area and efficient use of building land.

== Application ==
There are simple and inexpensive methods of gaining credits, like specifying compost and recycling bins, and costly methods such as installing solar photovoltaics.

Compliance with higher levels of the Code is voluntary, with a long-term view for step-change increases. Landowners and agents sell sites with stipulations to build at certain Code levels.

The extra-over cost of building to Code Level 3 was valued around £2000-3000. Additionally the Code assessment cost around £2000 for a small project. The total cost was typically under 5% of a standard build.

Code levels pertaining to energy required a Dwelling Emission Rate (DER) a certain percentage higher than the Target Emission Rate (TER) as set in Part L1A of the Building Regulations. The October 2010 version of the Code saw Part L 2010 TER standards rise equivalent to Code level 3. Following this change Code level 4 required 25% DER improvement over Part L1A 2010 TER standards and code level 5 required a 100% improvement i.e. thermally twice as efficient. It was also anticipated that the Building Regulations as well as the minimum mandatory Code level would continue to improve until the 2016 target of 'net zero CO_{2} emissions' was met. Guidance was also available via the Code's simply explained published document to clarify the technical requirements.

== Reaction ==
The scheme was welcomed by the WWF for putting zero carbon development at the top of the industry agenda, and by the Association for Environment Conscious Building for including "whole house" carbon emissions. Despite these positive reactions, even a zero carbon building would only achieve Level 1 of the Code unless further measures are taken to comply with other requirements. Other reactions were generally welcoming, but with some reservations.

Views of the scheme were not always so positive; early drafts were heavily criticised by industry commentators, both for being unnecessary (due to it being apparently modelled on the existing EcoHomes scheme) and due to its contents. In March 2011 the WWF representative on the Steering Group resigned "in despair" due to the failure of government to accept the Steering Group's advice and recommendations. The Construction Products Association criticised the original proposals as being confusing. The Sustainable Development Commission was keen that the standard was extended to cover existing homes, and covered this and other recommendations in its report 'Stock Take'.

In March 2014, the government announced plans to consolidate housing regulations and standards, including the scrapping of the Code for Sustainable Homes, with its some performance standards being integrated into the Building Regulations.

Code for Sustainable Homes was withdrawn by the Conservative Government in March 2015 for new developments. The Code continues to operate for "legacy developments" in England and in Wales and Northern Ireland

== See also ==
- Building Research Establishment
- BREEAM
- Association for Environment Conscious Building
- Energy efficiency in British housing
- Good Homes Alliance
- Green building
- Low Carbon Building Programme
- Sustainable design
- Sustainable development
- UK Green Building Council
- LEED Buildings

=== Compare to ===
- Haute Qualité Environnementale in France
- LEED in the United States and Canada
