= Good Homes Alliance =

UK organisation

Good Homes Alliance logo

The Good Homes Alliance is a UK organisation established in 2007 that grew to have over 70 members, including architects, planners, developers, universities, local authorities, urban designers, consultants, building professionals, and suppliers whose stated aim is to build and promote sustainable homes and communities. They also work to transform the whole of the mainstream UK house building into a sustainable endeavour. It is a not-for-profit community interest company with a board of directors.

Members subscribe to a charter for responsible housebuilding containing seven principles.

The Good Homes Alliance considers the following actions are necessary to help bring a quality focus back to new housing:

1. New UK wide near-zero carbon targets for new homes should be re-implemented with a new trajectory and timetable
2. Housebuilders and renewable energy developers must work together to develop new cost effective strategies to meet the new carbon reduction targets
3. The Building Regulations Part L and F should be reviewed
4. The compliance system based on SAP and EPCs is not fit for purpose and a new system is required that addresses energy demand reduction targets and post-construction verification
5. The skills needed to achieve quality construction must be embedded at every stage from concept to completion and for all disciplines, trades and professions
6. The Quality Control process at every stage from concept to completion must be tightened up and improved
7. Inhabitants health and well-being must be embedded in all aspects of the design and construction process

In addition to promotion of member projects and initiatives, the Alliance is involved in education (through seminars, research, and information sharing), lobbying the UK Government and land owners to encourage better quality housing standards via regulation, legislation and specifications, and raising awareness of sustainable development in the media and among the general public.

It also organises specialist cross sector working groups and currently (July 2017) runs the following: alternative housing delivery models; overheating solutions in new housing; zero energy buildings.

== Founding ==
The Good Homes Alliance was officially launched on 28 February 2007, at the Ecobuild 2007 exhibition. It was founded by four housing developers - BioRegional Quintain, Cornhill Estates, Kingerlee Homes, and Swan Country Homes, together with Natural Building Technologies, the Sustainable Development Foundation, The Prince's Foundation for the Built Environment, Working Group, and the Bartlett School of Graduate Studies at University College London.

== See also ==
- Association for Environment Conscious Building
- Code for Sustainable Homes
- Energy efficiency in British housing
- National House Building Council

=== Non-UK links ===
- Low-energy building
- Sustainability
- Green home
