= Assured periodic tenancy =

An assured periodic tenancy (APT) is the default type of residential tenancy in England. It was created by the Renters' Rights Act 2025, which converted most existing assured tenancies and assured shorthold tenancies (ASTs) to periodic tenanancies on 1 May 2026.

Unlike ASTs, assured periodic tenancies are "rolling", and do not have an end date. They may be ended by mutual agreement of tenant and landlord, by the tenant giving notice (usually two months), or by a section 8 notice from the landlord, which must provide a valid reason.

The notice period required depends upon the reason. In most cases it will be four months, but for other reasons it may be less, for example, rent arrears of a sufficient amount can lead to only a four week notice period being required.

Rent rises under APTs are limited to once per year, and may be appealed to a tribunal. Revenge evictions are no longer possible.
