= Landfill gas migration =

Movement of gases produced by waste in a landfill to areas outside it

Landfill gas migration is a complex process in which gases produced by waste in a landfill move from the original deposition to other places via diffusion, usually from areas of high concentration to low. The process is also affected by the permeability of the ground and other factors, such as pressure differences in the soil, cavities, pipes, and tunnels. Changes in atmospheric pressure and the water table can encourage this migration.

These gases can include methane (CH_{4}), carbon dioxide (CO_{2}), hydrogen (H_{2}), and volatile organic compounds (there are approximately 500 others that can be present in trace forms) from the waste on site and its degradation over time.

Steps must be taken to prevent this migration from the landfill site as it might enter buildings in the vicinity. This can be done on site by means of combinations of geomembranes and clay-based products; see gas protection.

== Gas protection ==
Gas protection for buildings should consist of an impermeable gas membrane and also a layer where the gas will collect and be vented in a controlled manner.

Guidance for this in the UK can be found in CIRIA C665 and also BS 8485 and Title 40 of the United States Code of Federal Regulations, parts 239 through 282. This subchapter I was initially promulgated in 1976 and is also known as the Resource Conservation and Recovery Act.

== See also ==
- Anaerobic digestion
- Atmospheric methane
- Final cover
- Environment of the United States
- Environmental issues in the United States
- Landfill gas monitoring
- Landfill gas utilization
- Waste minimisation
