= UK Green Building Council =

British environmentalist nonprofit

UK Green Building Council logo

The UK Green Building Council (UKGBC) is a United Kingdom membership organisation, formed in 2007, which aims to 'radically transform' the way that the built environment in the UK is planned, financed, designed, constructed, operated and repurposed.

The council is concerned about the environmental impact of buildings and infrastructure on the environment, in particular the use of water, materials, energy, the impact of greenhouse gas emissions, and the health of building occupants. It launched the Whole Life Net Zero Carbon Roadmap at COP26 in Glasgow, detailing how the built environment sector should cut emissions to meet 2050 targets. In June 2025, it launched the Climate Resilience Roadmap, detailing how buildings needed to be better prepared for more extreme weather events.

== Formation ==
The organisation was founded in the autumn of 2006 and launched in February 2007 in response to the 2004 Sustainable Building Task Group Report Better Buildings - Better Lives, which recommended the UK Government should "review the advisory bodies concerned with sustainable buildings to simplify and consolidate them and to provide clear direction to the industry" (para 1.8, p. 7).

Its first CEO was Paul King (formerly head of campaigns at WWF), who filled the role from its inception until December 2014, when he was succeeded by the current CEO, Julie Hirigoyen. In February 2023, the UKGBC confirmed Smith Mordak as its new CEO from 1 June 2023.. Simon McWhirter was named as CEO in June 2025.

UKGBC is a charitable organisation, and - through the World Green Building Council - is part of a global network of like-minded organisations in almost 80 countries. Its headquarters is at The Building Centre in London.

== See also ==
- Association for Environment Conscious Building
- Code for Sustainable Homes
- Energy efficiency in British housing
- Good Homes Alliance
- Green building
- Green Building Council
- Sustainable architecture
