= Association for Environment Conscious Building =

Professional association in the United Kingdom

AECB logo

The Association for Environment Conscious Building (AECB) is a network for sustainable building professionals in the United Kingdom. Some of whom are also members of the Club of Rome and the United Nations. Membership of the AECB includes local authorities, housing associations, builders, architects, designers, consultants and manufacturers. The association was founded in 1989 to increase awareness within the construction industry of the need to respect, protect, preserve and enhance the environment and to develop, share and promote best practice in environmentally sustainable building.

== Low-carbon building ==
While the AECB recognises that all aspects of sustainability are important, it believes that climate change threatens to overwhelm its members' achievements in other areas. It is therefore currently focusing on trying to help reduce carbon emissions related to domestic and non-domestic buildings in the UK (around 50% of UK CO_{2} emissions – excluding flying – relate to buildings). The association believes that the Government's target of a 60% reduction in CO_{2} emissions by 2050 is too little, too late, and that a reduction of at least 85% is required to meet the challenges of climate change.

=== Low-carbon standards ===
To promote low-carbon building, the association has developed three advanced energy standards, in order to provide three steps to low energy and low carbon buildings achievable by the UK over the next 40 years. These standards are largely based on the methodology and principles underlying the German Passivhaus movement, developed by the Passivhaus Institut, and are also informed by American, Canadian, Scandinavian and European energy standards and various successful energy efficient building programmes. The standards themselves lie at the centre of a developing education and training programme which the AECB has called the 'Carbon Literate Design and Construction Programme' (CLP).

The AECB standards are : the New Building Standard, Retrofit Standard 1 and Retrofit Standard 2.

The AECB has aimed these Standards at those wishing to create high-performance buildings using widely available technology at little or no extra cost. It estimates that these low-risk options, will reduce overall CO_{2} emissions by 70% compared with the UK average for buildings of each type – a result it feels is highly significant given the relative ease and low cost with which these standards could be met.

The AECB, believing that rigorous alternative approaches based on successful overseas' experience for sustainable design and construction have a complementary place alongside UK government initiatives, has been lobbying for the Government's Code for Sustainable Homes to be aligned with its CLP, or at least for the CLP (despite its methodological and base-line measuring differences) to be treated as an alternative official route for effectively designing and delivering low energy and low carbon buildings. The AECB has taken the stance of inviting the design and construction industry to judge for itself, based on actual real world performance of the resulting buildings, which low carbon design codes and programmes best deliver genuinely low energy and low carbon performance cost effectively.

== Low Energy Buildings Database ==
A guiding principle of the AECB is to focus on what works in practice to improve environmental performance and sustainability. The AECB established the Low Energy Buildings Database with the support of the Technology Strategy Board to show what could actually be achieved instead of what was hoped might be achieved during design development. The database draws on the collective experience of AECB members, and the team is involved in the Retrofit for the Future projects. This database gives an account to anyone planning a low-energy building of what can be achieved, along with how it has been done.

The database includes information on both refurbishment and new build projects, in both the domestic and non-domestic sectors. The database shows the performance of each building, in figures and graphs. Design intention can be compared with built reality, and projects can be compared with each other. For each project you can see detailed design strategies, descriptions and illustrations of the building type, the measures taken and technologies employed. As the monitoring figures accumulate, the database will offer increasing numbers of benchmarks for the energy and carbon performance levels that can be achieved, across a range of building types.

== Less is More ==
On 30 January 2012 the AECB released its report Less is More: Energy Security after Oil which was published at the end of an unprecedented fifteen years in UK energy policy history. It began with the formal acceptance of the need for a climate change policy by the last Conservative Government in 1997 and culminated with the Climate Change Act 2008 and the 4th Carbon Budget. Less is More is a significant new contribution to the debate and offers an alternative to the emerging orthodoxy of large-scale electrification of heat and road transport as a way to achieve or beat the UK's 2050 CO_{2} emissions target. This is based on more vigorous and systematic pursuit of energy efficiency throughout the economy; on technologies such as large-scale solar heat, piped to urban buildings; a road and air transport system synthesising liquid fuels in part from renewable electricity, supplementing the biofuel resource; a small electricity supply system, supplied largely by dispatchable sources, assisting with network security; and the more vigorous pursuit of carbon dioxide (CO_{2}) sequestration options, particularly in the biosphere.

Less is More contends that an electric future is more costly and could be slower to deliver significant CO_{2} reductions than the alternatives. Vigorous pursuit of energy efficiency, plus biosequestration, plus more focus on UK energy uses and the characteristics of energy systems, sets the stage for significantly cheaper and more secure energy supply options. Less-electric futures appear to have the capacity to deliver CO_{2} reductions both more cheaply and more quickly than more-electric. Cumulative emissions to 2050 are at least as important as emissions in the year 2050. The report highlights key areas for technology, product and supply chain development. They include piped heat, which is a mature technology in several of Britain's continental neighbours, and heats over 60% of Danish buildings, but remains uncommon in the UK. They include high-performance insulation systems that could significantly reduce losses in heat storage and distribution systems at all scales, along with renewable fuel production. Heat networks play a systematic role in the scenario, opening up access to large-scale solar, geothermal and waste heat resources at lower costs than new electricity sources and reducing the risk that the UK will be unable to keep the lights on.

Less is More contains a critique of the dysfunctionality of UK energy markets. The authors note that water is supplied by vertically-integrated and regulated local monopolies, which have access to capital at near-public sector interest rates, especially if they are debt-funded. They pose the question of why such arrangements cannot be used again in the energy sector, paralleling as it happens the situation with some private US utilities and with utilities in Denmark. The report does not offer the prospect of an easy path to energy independence and decarbonisation. It makes it very clear that all options pose acute difficulties. But it warns policy-makers not to reject technologies just because they appear difficult without making sober comparisons with the reality of the other technologies under consideration.

== Other AECB Resources ==
The AECB followed up Less is More with the Post-Fossil Fuel Building Construction and Materials report and continues to publish original material, training courses and podcasts. In 2022, it launched its own free magazine "Setting the Standard" which contains original commentary, analysis and thought pieces from the world of sustainable, green building.

== See also ==
- Code for Sustainable Homes
- Energy efficiency in British housing
- Good Homes Alliance
- Low-energy building
- National House Building Council
- UK Green Building Council
