= Building Research Establishment =

UK building science organisation

Coordinates: 51.7001°N 0.3737°W

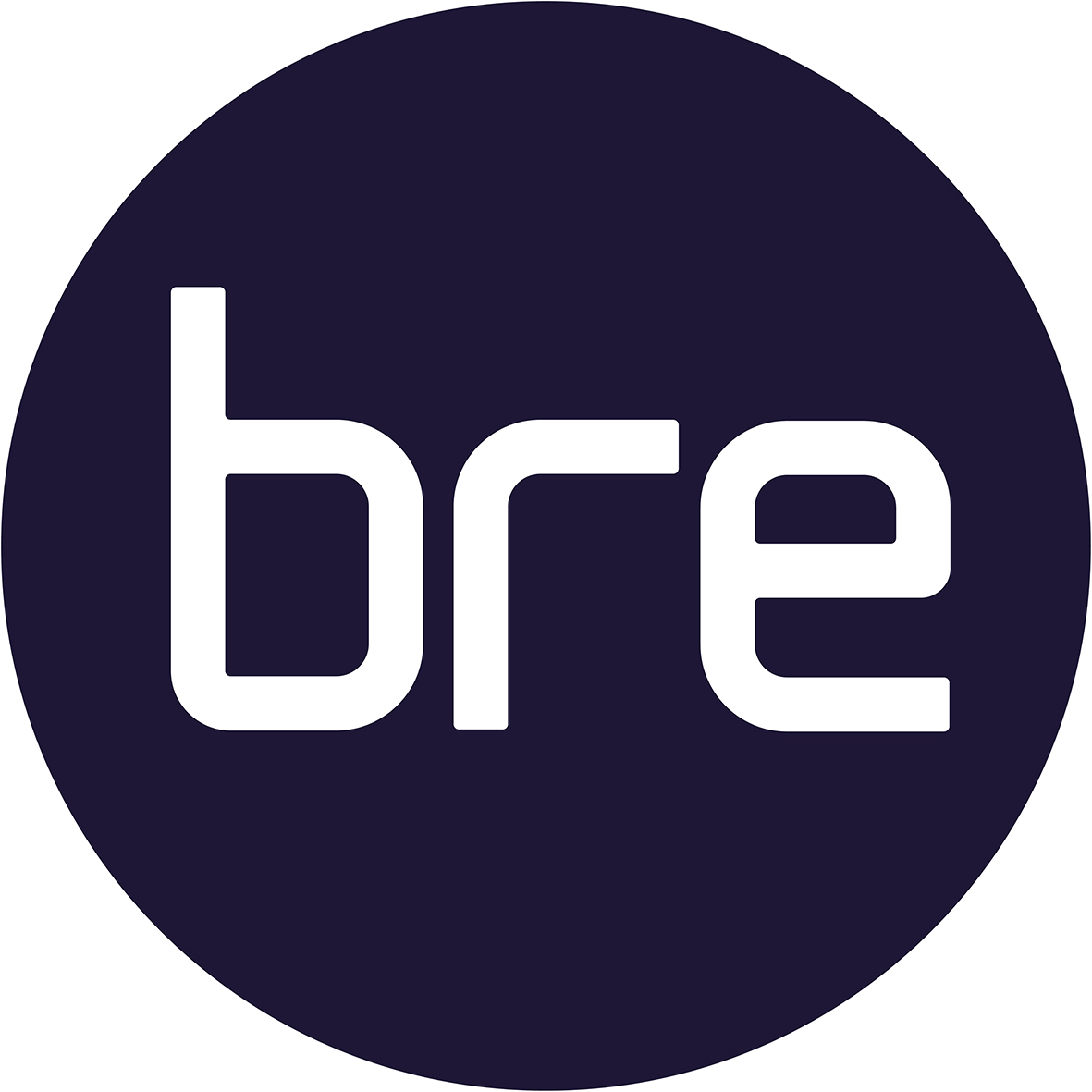

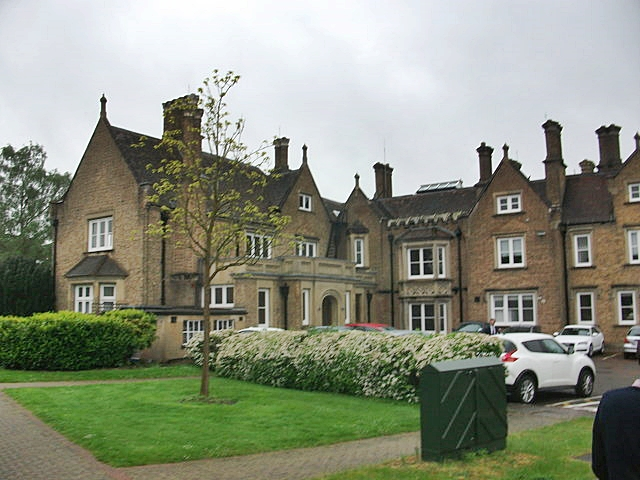
- Formation: 1921; 105 years ago
- Location: Garston, Hertfordshire, England

The Building Research Establishment (BRE) is a centre of building science in the United Kingdom, owned by charitable organisation the BRE Trust. It is a former UK government national laboratory, previously called Building Research Station (BRS), that was privatised in 1997.

BRE provides research, advice, training, testing, certification and standards for both public and private sector organisations in the UK and abroad. It has its headquarters in Garston, Hertfordshire, England, with regional sites in Glasgow, the US, China and Ireland.

BRE is funded with income from commissioned research, commercial programmes and by a number of digital tools for use in the construction sector.

== Programmes ==
- BRE's certification arm, BRE Global, is an independent, third-party certification body responsible for sustainability certification schemes such as BREEAM (for buildings, infrastructure, housing and communities) and LPCB certification (for fire and security products and services).
- BRE's training arm, the BRE Academy, provides online and classroom courses on built environment related issues like sustainability, fire, resilience and building information modelling (BIM).
- BRE also carries out research and data generation in support of national and international standards and building codes, including the UK building regulations. It has also developed its own standard for responsible sourcing (BES 6001), and ethical labour sourcing (BES 6002).
- BRE's digital tools include construction waste management tool SMARTWaste and construction health, safety and wellbeing tool YellowJacket. It also has UKAS accredited testing laboratories, and a publishing business in partnership with IHS Press called the BRE Bookshop.

== Ownership ==
The Building Research Establishment is owned by the BRE Trust, a registered charity dedicated to improving the built environment for the benefit of society. All of the profits accrued by BRE are passed to the trust and are used to fund new research and education programmes designed to meet the trust's goal of promoting the safety and sustainability of the built environment.

Over the last 20 years the BRE Trust has funded 117 PhDs on a total research programme of £15m, with other funding levered into the sector as a whole from research councils and European Union research sources.

The BRE Trust has also financially supported five university Centres of Excellence. One of the first centres established was at the University of Edinburgh in 2004, a research and education programme on fire safety engineering. The other centres are in Strathclyde (energy utilisation), Bath (construction materials), Cardiff (sustainable engineering), and Brasília (integrated and sustainable communities).

BRE continues to work with the education sector, primarily university and colleges, to shape the future of the industry and improve the employability of students on programmes ranging from architecture and civil engineering to business management and healthcare.

== History ==
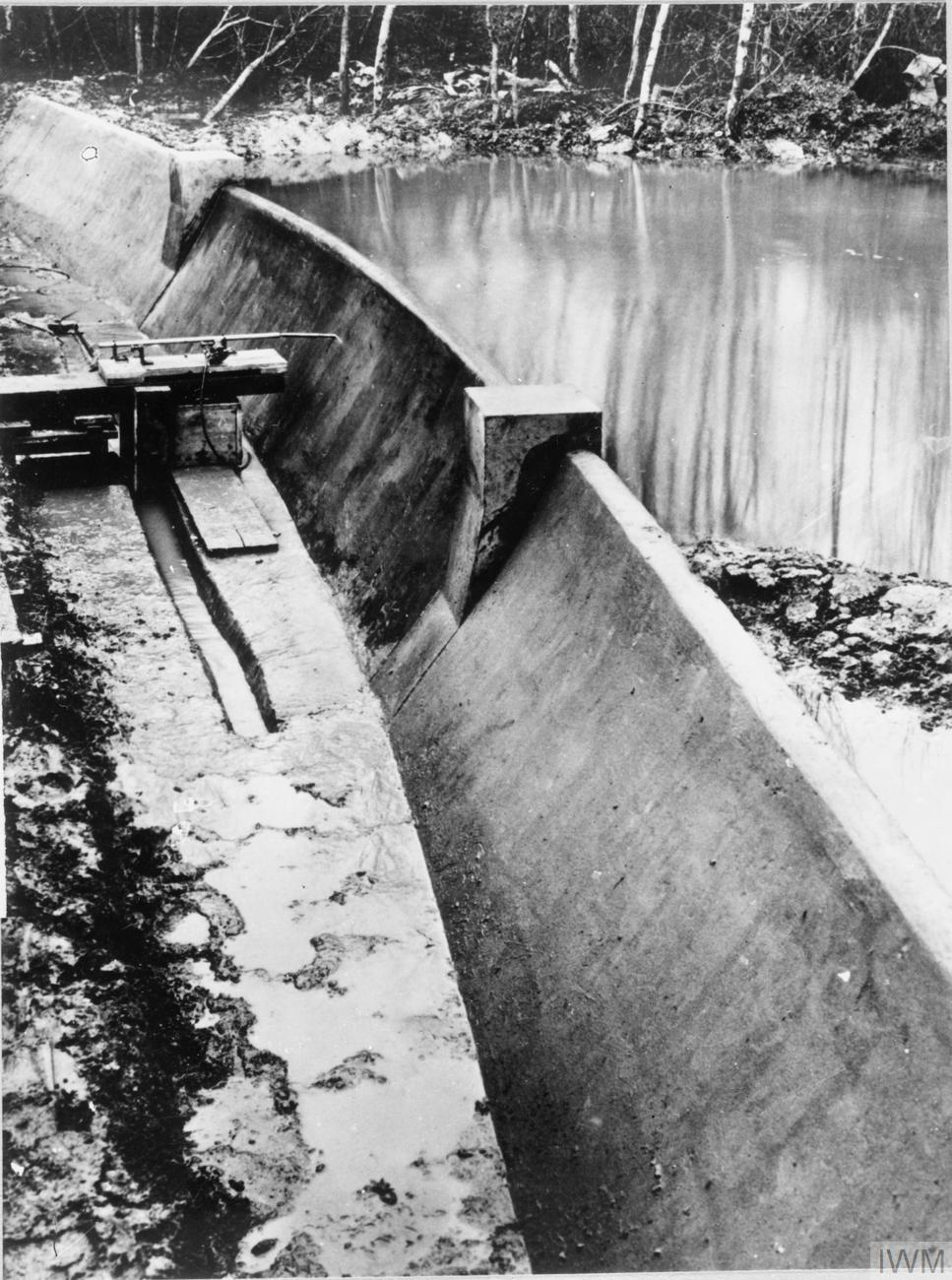
1943 image of 1:50 Scale model of the Möhne Dam built for Operation Chastise (the Dambusters' Raid), Building Research Establishment

BRE was founded in 1921 as the Building Research Board at East Acton as part of the British Civil Service, as an effort to improve the quality of housing in the United Kingdom.

During the Second World War, it was involved in the confidential research and development of the bouncing bomb for use against the Möhne Dam in the Dambusters Raid of 1943 A small scale model of the dam used for testing can still be found at the Centre in Garston, Watford, today.

BRE has an archive and some account of its history online.

In the 1950s, BRE's applied research was a pioneer in energy efficiency of buildings and their use (such as curtaining windows and draught reduction). It also embraced collaborative research. BRE was a founding member in 1976 of BSRIA, the Building Services Research and Information Association and the UK Green Building Council (UKGBC) in 2007.

Having subsumed a number of other government organisations over the years, including the former Fire Research Station, and The Forest Products Research Laboratory in Princes Risborough, it was given executive agency status in 1990, before being privatised by the Department of the Environment on 19 March 1997.

In 1990, BRE launched the sustainability assessment method BREEAM (Building Research Establishment Environmental Assessment Method). Designed to benchmark and improve the environmental performance of buildings, BREEAM is widely regarded as the world’s longest-established system of its kind. As of January 2025 more than 2.9 million assets had registered for assessment under the scheme.

From 1 January 2013, BRE took over the management of the UK and Ireland chapter of BuildingSMART. In 2017, this responsibility was passed to the UK BIM Alliance (now known as Nima).

In August 2016, Constructing Excellence merged with BRE, with BRE undertaking to maintain the CE's brands and functions.

Since the Grenfell Tower fire in June 2017, BRE has been criticised for holding poor fire safety standards, all the while via reviewing cases like that of Grenfell. The final (phase 2) report of the Grenfell Tower Inquiry, published in September 2024, was critical of BRE suggesting its once recognised international status as a leader in fire safety had been compromised, talking of a "desire to put BRE's status in the industry and commercial position ahead of considerations of public safety." Members of the House of Lords called for BRE to be stripped of its responsibility to certify modern methods of construction, following the Grenfell Inquiry criticism. BRE defended its role, rejected claims it was not impartial and insisting its testing approach was robust.

In 2021, BRE was appointed by the UK Government to lead a consortium to develop the Home Energy Model (HEM), a new approach for assessing the energy performance of new homes and for demonstrating compliance with energy efficiency and carbon-reduction requirements under the Future Homes Standard. HEM is also expected to underpin future Energy Performance Certificates and related policies. In 2025, BRE was re-appointed to continue its development.

BRE collaborated with a group of professional bodies and industry organisations to develop the UK Net Zero Carbon Buildings Standard, launched in 2024. The standard provides a common definition and methodology for assessing the carbon performance of buildings.

BRE has contributed to the technical development and delivery of the English Housing Survey (and its predecessor, the English House Condition Survey) since the 1970s. The survey collects data on housing conditions, energy efficiency and household circumstances in England. BRE has also used survey data to produce analyses of housing condition, associated health impacts and estimated costs to the National Health Service, which are used by policymakers, researchers and industry.

== See also ==
- Energy efficiency in British housing
- BRE Centre for Fire Safety Engineering at The University of Edinburgh
- Construction Industry Council
- BREEAM
- Post War Building Studies
- Construction Research and Innovation Strategy Panel

== Bibliography ==
- F.M. Lea (1971). Science and building: a history of the Building Research Station. HMSO.
- B.J. Rendle (1976). Fifty years of timber research: a short history of the Forest Products Research Laboratory, Princes Risborough. HMSO. ISBN 978-0-11-670546-4.
- R.E.H. Read (1994). A short history of the Fire Research Station, Borehamwood. BRE.
- G.S.T. Armer; P.S.J. Buller (1996). "Some highlights of 75 years' structural engineering research at BRE". Structural Engineer. 74 (11): 194–196. ISSN 1466-5123.
- R. Courtney (1997). "Building Research Establishment – past, present and future". Building Research and Information. 25 (5): 285–291. Bibcode:1997BuRI...25..285C. doi:10.1080/096132197370264. ISSN 1466-4321.
