= Loci Controls =

American software company

LoCI Controls, Inc. is an environmental services data and technology company. LoCI Controls develops software and devices that utilize a wireless sensor network to optimize the extraction of methane from landfills.

== Background ==
The company was founded by two MIT graduate students, Andrew Campanella and Melinda Sims (née Hale) in 2013. LoCI Controls received a grant from the Massachusetts Clean Energy Center in the amount of $40,000 USD in January 2014 as a partial section of its Catalyst Program. The program invests in new researchers and companies.

== Technology & Impact ==
LoCI's system is designed to increase methane gas extraction from landfills. The software and hardware provide remote monitoring and control, versus historical practices, which require twice-monthly on-site monitoring and manual adjustments to extract the methane.

== External Write-Ups ==
- "The LoCI system offers tailored alerts, a custom algorithm that predicts needed adjustments to the gas collection system, and automatic controls to monitor gas production."
- "The reduction in methane results in less pollution, toxins and odors. With the LoCI Controls solution, revenue from landfill gas-to-energy plants is increased, risk of noncompliance is mitigated, and odor complaints can be instantly addressed."
