= Eviction in England =

Expulsion of a person from property

In English law, eviction is the deliberate expulsion of a person from a property they live in. The concept of eviction includes overt measures to stop the person entering (such as changing the locks), but also any act likely to interfere with their peace and comfort, without reasonable grounds, done with intent to cause them to leave. It is a criminal offence for a landlord to evict a tenant without a court order, unless (a) the tenant lives with the landlord in the landlord's home, (b) the tenant does not pay rent, or (c) the property is a hotel or holiday let.

The rules around evicting residential tenants drastically changed on 1 May 2026, when the Renters' Rights Act 2025 came into force. By far the most common type of eviction is where the landlord of a residential property seeks to remove a renter, but the steps for mortgage repossessions are the same.

The process of eviction has two or three stages. Firstly, one of the parties must issue a notice to quit; secondly, the court must grant a possession order; and thirdly, if the tenant does not leave as specified in the possession order, the court must grant a warrant for possession.

== Notice to quit ==
From 1 May 2026, most residential tenancies became assured periodic tenancies, even if the agreement is called something else (most commonly "assured shorthold tenancy"). The process to end a tenancy depends on whether it is the landlord who wants to end it.

=== Notice to quit by landlord ===
The landlord must give a section 8 notice on form 3a of the assured tenancy forms. This notice must give a reason, and must give the tenant four months' notice, except where the property is for occupation by:

1. Students and the landlord is a university or college, in which case they must give the tenant two weeks' notice;
2. A minister of religion and is needed for that purpose, in which case they must give the tenant two months' notice;
3. An agricultural worker or key worker, in which case they must give the tenant two months' notice;
4. Their employee, and the person is no longer employed, in which case they must give the tenant two months' notice;
5. As supported accommodation, in which case they must give the tenant four weeks' notice;
6. As temporary accommodation for someone statutorily homeless, in which case they must give the tenant four weeks' notice;
7. A special category of person, where the provider is a charity or social housing provider and the rent is significantly below the market, and the tenant no longer meets the eligibility criteria, in which case they must give the tenant two months' notice;
8. A person who has died, and a person inheriting the tenancy did not live there, in which case they must give the successor tenant two months' notice;
9. A person who has been convicted of criminal behaviour, breached an anti-social behaviour order, or the police have applied for a closure order to bar them from the premises, in which case the notice can be immediate;
10. A person who has been offered suitable alternative accommodation, in which case they must give the tenant two months' notice;
11. A person who owes rent, in which case they must give the tenant four weeks' notice;
12. A person who has breached another term of the tenancy not related to paying rent, in which case they must give the tenant two weeks' notice;
13. A person who is damaging the property or furniture in it, or allowing it to deteriorate, in which case they must give the tenant two weeks' notice;
14. A person who is carrying out domestic abuse, where the provider is a social landlord, in which case they must give the tenant two weeks' notice;
15. A person living at the property has been convicted of an offence during a riot, in which case they must give the tenant two weeks' notice;
16. A person who gained the tenancy by giving false information, in which case they must give the tenant two weeks' notice.

Some of these grounds are "mandatory", meaning that the Court must grant a possession order if it finds the grounds for eviction are accurate, and others are "discretionary", meaning that the Court may grant a possession order if it is reasonable to do so.

=== Notice to quit by tenant ===
A tenant can terminate the tenancy without giving a reason. In cases where there is more than one tenant, any of the tenants can give notice to quit, with or without consulting their joint tenants. If they do, this ends the tenancy for all of the tenants.

The maximum period that can be required is two months' notice, but a tenant can give less notice if the contract allows.

The other tenant or tenants have no right to remain and become trespassers when the notice period expires, but if they do not leave voluntarily, the landlord cannot remove them without a court order. If they pay any rent, this may become mesne profits.

=== Effect of notice to quit ===
A tenant who has received a notice to quit becomes eligible for homelessness help from their local authority, if they:

1. Have no alternative accommodation to go to; and
2. Are British or meet the immigration conditions.

== Possession order ==
Once the notice to quit has expired, the landlord can normally apply for a possession order, except where one or more of the tenants are protected from their creditors by a Debt Respite Scheme, which can delay the application for possession by up to a further 60 days, or more in the case of a so-called "mental health breathing space". Applying for possession costs the landlord a variable amount; as of 2026 the typical cost is £404. A tenant who has received a notice to quit can get government-funded legal advice from the Housing Loss Prevention Advice Service.

The court will allocate a date for the hearing, which under civil procedure rules should be within 8 weeks of the application being made. The landlord and tenant must attend. Most possession claims are heard by a district judge.

The court can issue:

- An outright possession order. This gives a date on which the tenant must leave, usually 14 or 28 days after the hearing date.
- A suspended possession order. This means the tenant can remain in the property but only while they comply with the Court's conditions, such as paying the rent and making progress against their arrears.
- An adjournment on terms. This gives the tenant time to prove that they can keep to payment terms and other conditions, but the landlord can restart the claim if the tenant breaches the terms.
- An adjournment to a fixed date. This could be to allow the tenant more time to deal with the benefits authorities, to get legal advice, or to file a counterclaim.
- An adjournment with directions. This usually means the court needs more evidence.
- A dismissal. This usually means either the court is not satisfied that the landlord's grounds for possession are borne out, or the landlord has not followed the correct legal process.

Alongside these options the court can also issue a money judgment (which is a court order requiring one of the parties to pay a debt such as rent arrears) and a costs order (which is a court order requiring one of the parties to pay the other's costs). Costs can include court fees, solicitor's fees and disbursements. Normally, where the landlord proves the tenant has serious rent arrears, the court will issue all three, i.e. a possession order, a money judgment instructing the tenant to clear the arrears, and a costs order requiring the tenant to pay the landlord's legal costs.

Within 21 days of the date of the order, the tenant can appeal. Appeal is to the County Court.

== Warrant of possession ==
Once the tenant has exhausted their appeals and the date on the possession order has passed, the landlord can apply to the court for a warrant of possession, unless the tenant is protected from their creditors by a Debt Respite Scheme, which can delay the application by up to a further 60 days, or more in the case of a so-called "mental health breathing space". Applying for a warrant of possession costs the landlord a fixed sum; as of 2026 the cost in the County Court is £148. The court bailiff must then give 14 days' notice to the tenant of the warrant's execution. The tenant can apply to the court to stay or suspend the warrant up to three days before it is executed.

If the warrant is not suspended, the court bailiff can execute it. However, the tenant can refuse to unlock their doors to a bailiff. Bailiffs can only enter through the front door, and cannot force entry for housing possession claims.
