= Post War Building Studies =

The Post-War Building Studies are a set of technical reports published by the British Ministry of Works starting in 1944. The Directorate of Post-War Building was established in 1941 under Sir James West. The Directorate was charged with coordinating solutions for construction of housing to replace homes that had been destroyed as well as homes that had been deferred due to war. The Directorate reported to the Minister of Works, initially Lord Reith then later Lord Portal. The publications were produced by various committees (such as the Burt Committee) composed of architects, engineers, and representatives from the building industry. The studies standardized non-traditional methods of building construction including the use of pre-fabricated elements and poured concrete. A new standard system for wiring homes for electricity was described in report no. 11. The reports had a significant impact on the design and construction of buildings in the UK after the war and continue to be cited as references, though their recommendations on fire safety were later found to be insufficient as apartment buildings became taller. However, the BS 1363 power socket (another product of the studies) has proved long-lasting and is still in use in British homes today. While not made part of mandatory building codes and regulations, the reports provided technical guidance and information on application of non-traditional building techniques and materials while overcoming material and labour shortages.

Based on the experience following World War I, it was expected that housing construction demand would be very high after WWII ended, both due to pent-up demand that had not been fulfilled and also due to replacement or repair of housing that had been bombed during the war. Labour and material were expected to be in short supply. Interest in industrial methods, pre-fabrication and new materials was high during the period between the wars, and such publications as the Tudor Walters Report of 1918 gave details on new methods of construction and new materials, including recommendations to improve construction efficiency by better site organisation, increased accuracy of cost accounting, and keeping building trade workers regularly employed. The Directorate of Post-War Building and the Directorate of Building Materials were established by the Ministry of Works. These groups took on research into new methods and published the Post War Building Studies in 33 volumes between 1944 and 1946. Experimental work was carried out at the Building Research Station and reported in the series.

== List of reports ==
- "House Construction," (Burt Report), No. 1 (1944)
- "Standard Construction for Schools", No. 2 (1944)
- "Plastics", No. 3
- "Plumbing" No. 4
- "The Painting of Buildings", No. 5
- "Gas Installations", No. 6
- "Steel Structures" No. 7, (1944)
- "Reinforced Concrete Structures", No. 8
- "Solid Fuel Installations" No. 10
- "Electrical Installations", No. 11 (1944)
- "The Lighting of Buildings", No. 12 (1944)
- "Non-ferrous Metals", No. 13
- "Sound Insulation and Acoustics", No. 14 (1944)
- "Walls, Floors, and Roofs" No. 15
- "Business Buildings", No. 16
- "Farm Buildings", No. 17
- "The Architectural Use of Building Materials", No. 18
- "Heating and Ventilating of Buildings", No. 19
- "Fire Grading of Buildings (Part I)" (Egerton Report) No. 20
- "Farm Buildings for Scotland", No. 22
- "House Construction (Second Report)", No. 23 (1946)
- "School Furniture and Equipment", No. 24
- "House Construction (Third Report)", No. 25 (1948)
- "Domestic Drainage", No. 26
- "Heating and Ventilation of Schools", No. 27
- "Precautions Against Fire and Explosion in Underground Car Parks " No. 28 (1950)
- "Fire Grading of Buildings (Parts II, III, IV)" No. 29, 1952
- "Lighting of Office Buildings", No. 30
- "Basic Design Temperatures for Space Heating", No. 33

== See also ==
- Ministry of Reconstruction
- Building code
- Building regulations in the United Kingdom
