= Biogas =

Gases produced by decomposing organic matter

Simple sketch of household biogas plant

Biogas is a renewable gaseous fuel generated from organic materials including agricultural residues, manure, municipal waste, plant matter, sewage, wastewater, green waste, and food waste. Biogas is produced industrially via anaerobic digestion with anaerobic organisms or methanogens inside an anaerobic digester or other type of bioreactor. The gas composition is primarily methane (CH_{4}) and carbon dioxide (CO_{2}) with small amounts of hydrogen sulfide (H_{2}S) produced as a byproduct. Biogas is typically saturated with water vapour as a result of anaerobic micro-organisms living in water. Trace quantities of volatile organic compounds and siloxanes can also vapourize into biogas, if they are present in the biomass feedstock.

Biogas is considered to be a renewable energy resource as the methane can be combusted to release energy. This energy release allows biogas to be used as a fuel. Biogas and its derivatives are used for multiple purposes including heat for cooking, electricity generation, and as a vehicle fuel. At a high level, biogas is a carbon-neutral fuel in so far as emissions of carbon dioxide from its combustion are matched by carbon dioxide pulled from the atmosphere to produce biomass. In practice, the carbon intensity of biogas can vary depending on emissions from the production of biomass and the processes used to produce and upgrade biogas. In some applications, the capturing of biogas can avoid emissions of methane reducing overall emissions.

Biogas can be upgraded to natural gas quality specifications by stripping carbon dioxide and other contaminants. Biogas that has been upgraded to interchangeability with natural gas is called renewable natural gas (RNG). RNG can be used as a drop-in fuel in the gas grid or to produce compressed natural gas as a vehicle fuel.

== Production ==
Biogas is produced by microorganisms, such as methanogens and sulfate-reducing bacteria, performing anaerobic respiration. Biogas can refer to gas produced naturally and industrially.

As of 2026, biogas production primarily comes from large-scale industrial plants.

=== Natural ===
In soil, methane is produced in anaerobic environments by methanogens, but is mostly consumed in aerobic zones by methanotrophs. Methane emissions result when the balance favors methanogens. Wetland soils are the main natural source of methane. Other sources include oceans, forest soils, termites, and wild ruminants.

=== Industrial ===
Anaerobic digestion is a sequence of processes by which microorganisms break down biodegradable material in the absence of oxygen. This process produces biogas which can be used as a fuel. Industrial biogas production can either be purpose-built such as anaerobic digesters built to process manure and organic waste or can harvest biogas produced as byproduct from landfills or wastewater treatment plants.

==== Biogas plants ====
A biogas plant is the name often given to an anaerobic digester that treats farm wastes, municipal organic waste and/or energy crops. Industrial biogas plants process organic material in an air-tight tank to create anaerobic conditions. The material is heated to either mesophilic (~38 °C (100 °F)) or thermophilic (>55 °C (131 °F)) and held for a typical retention time of two to thirty days. Biogas produced from these facilities is either combusted for electricity production using a combined heat and power system or upgraded to biomethane for use in vehicles or natural gas distribution systems.

These plants can be fed with energy crops such as maize silage or biodegradable wastes including sewage sludge and food waste. Feedstock type significantly influences methane yield: fats and food waste can produce up to 800 m^{3} of gas per tonne of dry matter, while animal manure yields approximately 20-30 m^{3} per tonne, though it offers greater process stability. During the process, the micro-organisms transform biomass waste into biogas and digestate. Higher quantities of biogas can be produced when the wastewater is co-digested with other residuals from the dairy industry, sugar industry, or brewery industry. For example, while mixing 90% of wastewater from beer factory with 10% cow whey, the production of biogas was increased by 2.5 times compared to the biogas produced by wastewater from the brewery only.

==== Landfill gas ====
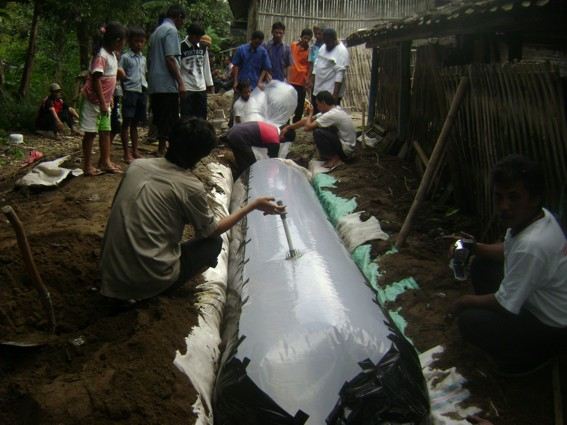
An Indonesian community installs a cylindrical plastic biogas reactor in order to turn their organic waste into energy, 2007

Landfill gas is produced by wet organic waste decomposing under anaerobic conditions in a similar way to biogas. The waste is covered and mechanically compressed by the weight of the material that is deposited above. This material prevents oxygen exposure thus allowing anaerobic microbes to thrive. Biogas builds up and is slowly released into the atmosphere if the site has not been engineered to capture the gas. Landfill gas released in an uncontrolled way can be hazardous since it can become explosive when it escapes from the landfill and mixes with oxygen. The lower explosive limit is 5% methane and the upper is 15% methane.

The methane in biogas is 28 times more potent a greenhouse gas than carbon dioxide. Therefore, uncontained landfill gas, which escapes into the atmosphere may significantly contribute to the effects of global warming. In addition, volatile organic compounds (VOCs) in landfill gas contribute to the formation of photochemical smog.

=== Faecal sludge ===
Faecal sludge is a product of onsite sanitation systems. After collection and transport, faecal sludge can be treated as sewage in a conventional treatment plant, or independently in a faecal sludge treatment plant. Faecal sludge can be co-treated with organic solid waste in composting or in an anaerobic digestion system that includes biogas production. Resource Recovery and Reuse is a subprogram of the CGIAR Research Program on Water, Land and Ecosystems. It claims post-processing for energy recovery is economically feasible and would tackle sanitation, health and environmental issues.

Wastewater treatment accounted for 3-4% of US electricity consumption in 2025 (vs 0.5% for electric vehicle charging. Conventional treatment processes issue ~ 21 million metric tons of greenhouse gases annually. About half of the ~15,000 wastewater treatment facilities in the USA use anaerobic digestion, which typically converts <40% of the sludge into biogas. The rest typically is sent to landfills, releasing methane and CO_{2}.

==== Dangers ====
The content of toxic hydrogen sulfide presents additional risks and has been responsible for serious accidents. Leaks of unburned methane are an additional risk, because methane is a potent greenhouse gas. A facility may leak 2% of the methane.

Biogas forms an explosive mixture with air at concentrations between approximately 6% and 22% by volume. To eliminate this hazard during maintenance, empty digesters must be properly ventilated, cleared of gas, and monitored before entry. Crucially, the system must be designed and operated to prevent negative pressure, which can draw air in and create an explosive atmosphere. This is ensured by technical controls, such as automatic shut-off devices, not merely by avoiding a specific minimum pressure.

Frequent smell checks must be performed on a biogas system. If biogas is smelled anywhere windows and doors should be opened immediately. If there is a fire the gas should be shut off at the gate valve of the biogas system.

== Composition ==
Typical composition of biogas
Compound	Formula	Percentage by volume
Methane	CH_{4}	50–80
Carbon dioxide	CO_{2}	15–50
Nitrogen	N_{2}	0–10
Hydrogen	H_{2}	0–1
Hydrogen sulfide	H_{2}S	0–0.5
Oxygen	O_{2}	0–2.5
Source: www.kolumbus.fi, 2007

The composition of biogas varies depending upon the substrate composition, as well as the conditions within the anaerobic reactor (temperature, pH, and substrate concentration). A 2025 study in Ethiopia concluded that agroecology (which influences ambient temperature), biogas plant design, and temperature significantly affect biogas yield quality. Landfill gas typically has methane concentrations around 50%. Advanced waste treatment technologies can produce biogas with 55–75% methane, which for reactors with free liquids can be increased to 80–90% methane using in-situ gas purification techniques. As produced, biogas contains water vapor. The fractional volume of water vapor is a function of biogas temperature; correction of measured gas volume for water vapour content and thermal expansion is easily done via simple mathematics which yields the standardized volume of dry biogas.

For 1000 kg (wet weight) of input to a typical biodigester, total solids may be 30% of the wet weight while volatile suspended solids may be 90% of the total solids. Protein would be 20% of the volatile solids, carbohydrates would be 70% of the volatile solids, and finally fats would be 10% of the volatile solids. Biochemical oxygen demand (BOD) is a measure of the amount of oxygen required by aerobic micro-organisms to decompose the organic matter in a sample of material being used in the biodigester as well as the BOD for the liquid discharge allows for the calculation of the daily energy output from a biodigester.

=== Contaminants ===
==== Sulfur compounds ====
Toxic, corrosive and foul smelling hydrogen sulfide (H_{2}S) is the most common contaminant in biogas. If not separated, combustion will produce sulfur dioxide (SO_{2}) and sulfuric acid (H_{2}SO_{4}), which are corrosive and environmentally hazardous., Other sulfur-containing compounds, such as thiols may be present.

==== Ammonia ====
Ammonia (NH_{3}) is produced from organic compounds containing nitrogen, such as the amino acids in proteins. If not separated from the biogas, combustion results in NO_{x} emissions.

==== Siloxanes ====
In some cases, biogas contains siloxanes. They are formed from the anaerobic decomposition of materials commonly found in soaps and detergents. During combustion of biogas containing siloxanes, silicon is released and can combine with free oxygen or other elements in the combustion gas. Deposits are formed containing mostly silica (SiO_{2}) or silicates (Si_{x}O_{y}) and can contain calcium, sulfur, zinc, phosphorus. Such white mineral deposits accumulate to a surface thickness of several millimeters and must be removed by chemical or mechanical means.

== Debate ==
=== Arguments in favor ===
With simple technology at the household level, the anaerobic fermentation of organic matter produces a stable and non-poisonous fuel which can be used for cooking, lighting, and farm machinery.

High levels of methane are produced when manure is stored under anaerobic conditions. During storage and when manure has been applied to the land, nitrous oxide is also produced as a byproduct of the denitrification process. Nitrous oxide (N_{2}O) is 273 times more aggressive as a greenhouse gas than carbon dioxide and methane 27 times more than carbon dioxide.

By converting cow manure into methane biogas via anaerobic digestion, the millions of cattle in the United States would be able to produce 100 billion kilowatt hours of electricity, enough to power millions of homes across the United States. One cow can produce enough manure in one day to generate 3 kilowatt hours of electricity. Furthermore, by converting cattle manure into methane biogas instead of letting it decompose, global warming gases could be reduced by 99 million tonnes (97×10^{6} long tons; 109×10^{6} short tons) or 4%.

=== Arguments against ===
Others environmental groups have argued that manure based biogases are a form of greenwashing. They argue it encourages and subsidies the use of concentrated animal feeding operations and emits other pollutants such as hydrogen sulfide. In 2022, 6 US senators including Bernie Sanders and Elizabeth Warren argued biogas would not be able to succeed without taxpayer dollars and that those would be better used on other methods. They also argued that they may accelerate consolidation in the industry and see farms expand their size specifically to be large enough to receive biogas subsidies. They point to evidence farmers did this following California's rollout of biogas incentive programs.

Others have argued the level of funding to biogas is already particularly outsized. For instance, in Wisconsin, just two years (2022–2023) of spending on biogas has been higher than 12 years of spending on solar energy. Manufacturing of biogas from intentionally planted maize has been described as being unsustainable and harmful due to very concentrated, intense and soil eroding character of these plantations.

== Applications ==
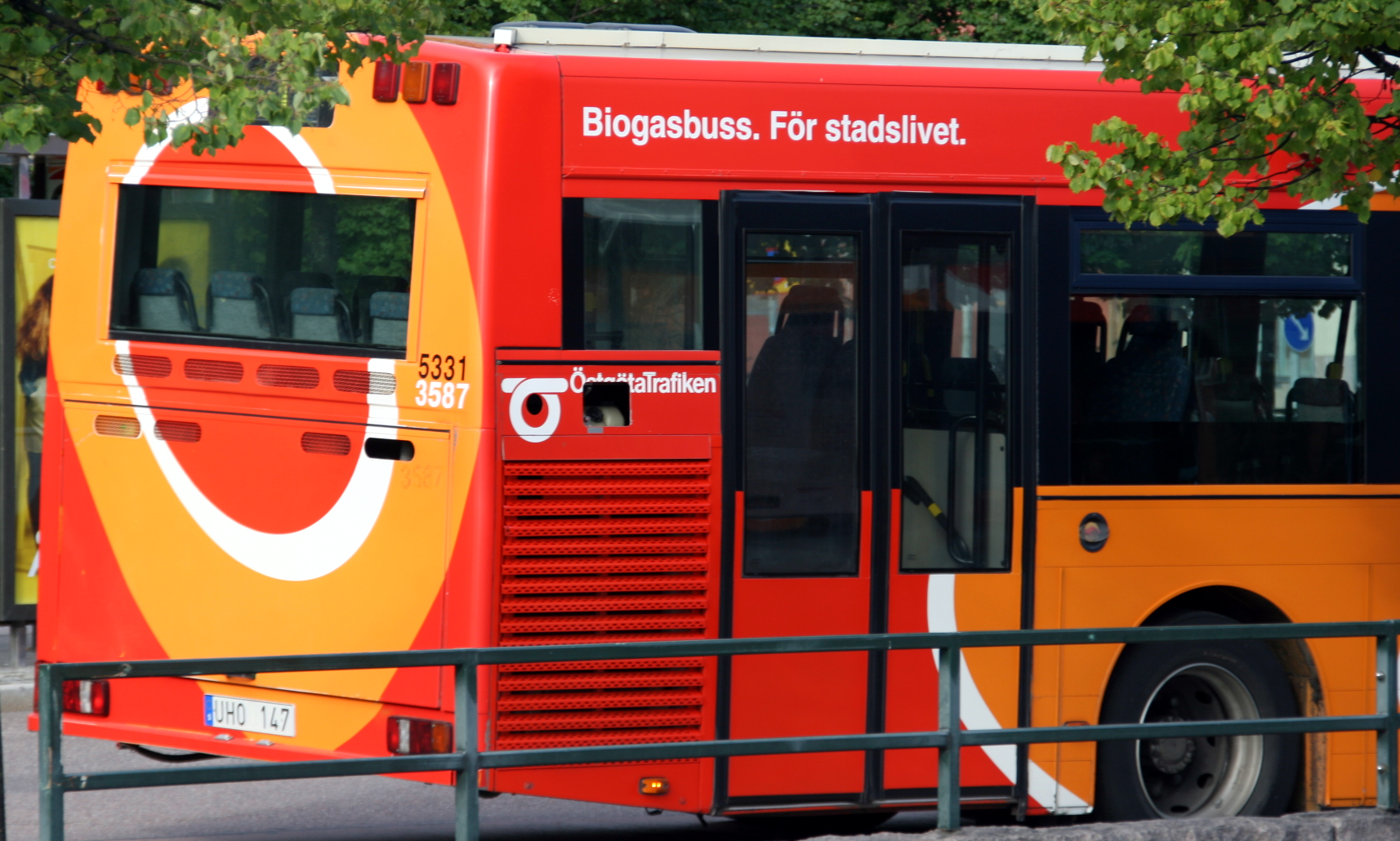
A biogas bus in Linköping, Sweden

Biogas can be used for electricity production on sewage works, in a CHP gas engine, where the waste heat from the engine is conveniently used for heating the digester; cooking; space heating; water heating; and process heating. If compressed, it can replace compressed natural gas for use in vehicles, where it can fuel an internal combustion engine or fuel cells and is a much more effective displacer of carbon dioxide than the normal use in on-site CHP plants.

=== Upgrading ===
Biogas produced contains up to 50% inert gases like carbon dioxide and nitrogen, which reduces the calorific value of the gas. Biogas also contains corrosive compounds, such as hydrogen sulfide, which corrodes pipes and machinery. Methane in biogas can be concentrated via a biogas upgrader to the same standards as fossil natural gas, which itself has to go through a cleaning process, and becomes biomethane. If the local gas network allows, the producer of the biogas may use their distribution networks. Gas must be very clean to reach pipeline quality and must be of the correct composition for the distribution network to accept. Carbon dioxide, water, hydrogen sulfide, and particulates must be removed if present.

There are four main methods of upgrading: water washing, pressure swing absorption, selexol absorption, and amine gas treating. In addition to these, the use of membrane separation technology for biogas upgrading is increasing, and there are already several plants operating in Europe and USA. The most prevalent method is water washing where high pressure gas flows into a column where the carbon dioxide and other trace elements are scrubbed by cascading water running counter-flow to the gas. This arrangement could deliver 98% methane with manufacturers guaranteeing maximum 2% methane loss in the system. It takes roughly between 3% and 6% of the total energy output in gas to run a biogas upgrading system.

=== Gas-grid injection ===
Gas-grid injection is the injection of biogas into the methane grid (natural gas grid) is possible if biogas is upgraded to biomethane. Until the breakthrough of micro combined heat and power two-thirds of all the energy produced by biogas power plants was lost (as heat). Using the grid to transport the gas to consumers, the energy can be used for on-site generation, resulting in a reduction of losses in the transportation of energy. Typical energy losses in natural gas transmission systems range from 1% to 2%; in electricity transmission they range from 5% to 8%. Before being injected in the gas grid, biogas passes a cleaning process, during which it is upgraded to natural gas quality. During the cleaning process trace components harmful to the gas grid and the final users are removed.

=== Transport ===
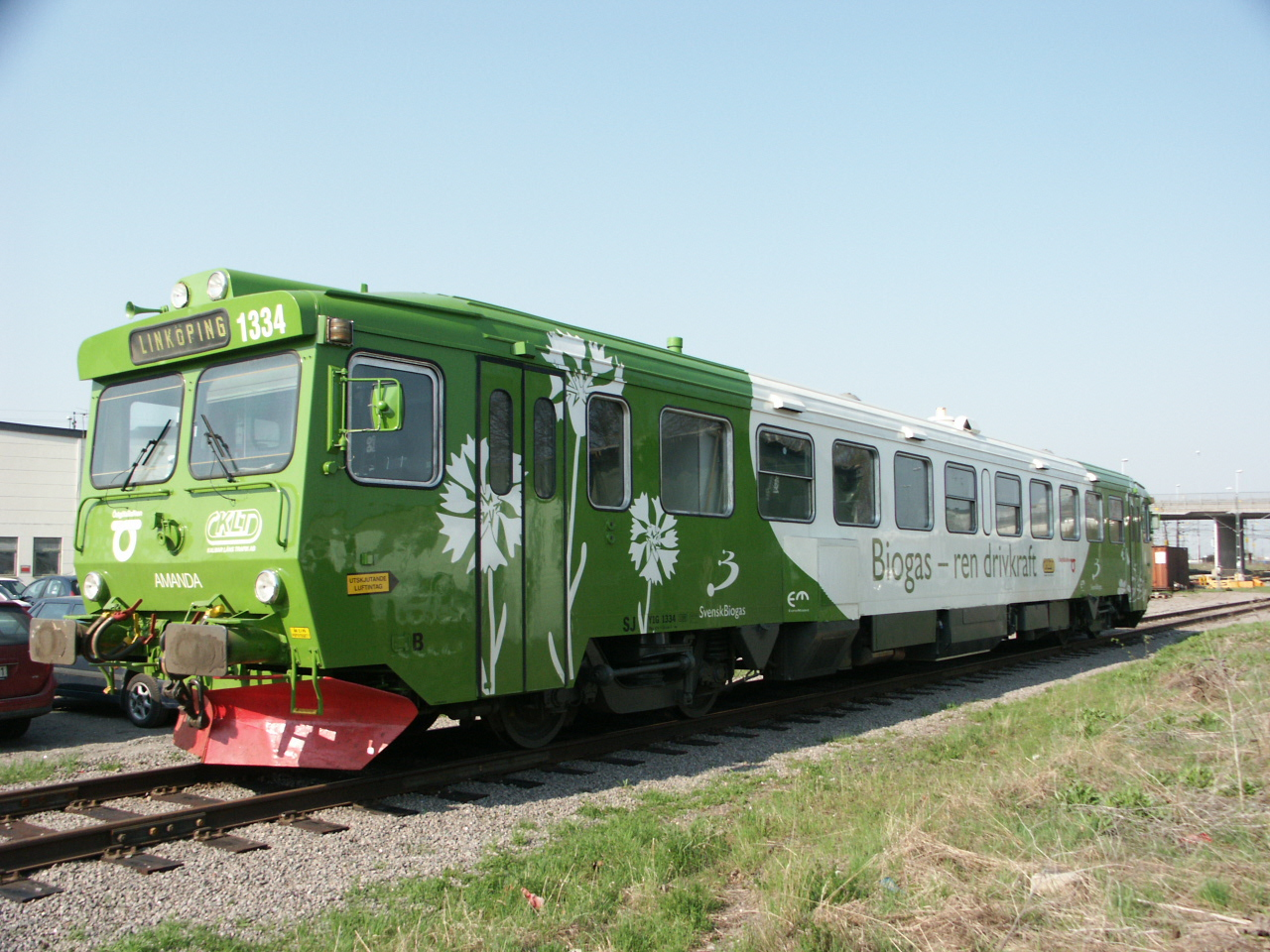
"Biogaståget Amanda" ("Amanda the Biogas Train") train near Linköping station, Sweden

If concentrated and compressed, it can be used in vehicle transportation. Compressed biogas is becoming widely used in Sweden, Switzerland, and Germany. A biogas-powered train, named Biogaståget Amanda (The Biogas Train Amanda), has been in service in Sweden since 2005. Biogas powers automobiles. In 1974, a British documentary film titled Sweet as a Nut detailed the biogas production process from pig manure and showed how it fueled a custom-adapted combustion engine. In 2007, an estimated 12,000 vehicles were being fueled with upgraded biogas worldwide, mostly in Europe.

Biogas is part of the wet gas and condensing gas (or air) category that includes mist or fog in the gas stream. The mist or fog is predominately water vapor that condenses on the sides of pipes or stacks throughout the gas flow. Biogas environments include wastewater digesters, landfills, and animal feeding operations (covered livestock lagoons). Ultrasonic flow meters are one of the few devices capable of measuring in a biogas atmosphere. Most of thermal flow meters are unable to provide reliable data because the moisture causes steady high flow readings and continuous flow spiking, although there are single-point insertion thermal mass flow meters capable of accurately monitoring biogas flows with minimal pressure drop. They can handle moisture variations that occur in the flow stream because of daily and seasonal temperature fluctuations, and account for the moisture in the flow stream to produce a dry gas value.

=== Heat/electricity ===
Biogas can be used in different types of internal combustion engines, such as the Jenbacher or Caterpillar gas engines. Other internal combustion engines such as gas turbines and BHPPs are suitable for the conversion of biogas into both electricity and heat. The digestate is the remaining inorganic matter that was not transformed into biogas. It can be used as an agricultural fertiliser. Biogas can be used as the fuel in the system of producing biogas from agricultural wastes and co-generating heat and electricity in a combined heat and power (CHP) plant. Unlike the other green energy such as wind and solar, the biogas can be quickly accessed on demand. The global warming potential can also be greatly reduced when using biogas as the fuel instead of fossil fuel. However, the acidification and eutrophication potentials produced by biogas are 25 and 12 times higher respectively than fossil fuel alternatives. This impact can be reduced by using correct combination of feedstocks, covered storage for digesters and improved techniques for retrieving escaped material. Overall, the results still suggest that using biogas can lead to significant reduction in most impacts compared to fossil fuel alternative. The balance between environmental damage and green house gas emission should still be considered while implicating the system.

== Technological advancements ==
Projects such as NANOCLEAN are developing new ways to produce biogas more efficiently, using iron oxide nanoparticles in the processes of organic waste treatment. This process allegedly can triple biogas production.

== Global developments ==
=== China ===
The development and construction of biogas digestors by peasants in China was widespread from the early part of the Great Leap Forward until the early 1970s. As of 2026, the Chinese experience with bigas digestors continues to influence similar efforts in developing countries.

As of 2023, China is both the world's largest producer and largest consumer of household biogas. During the last few years, technology has met high growth rates. This seems to be the earliest developments in generating biogas from agricultural waste.

The rural biogas construction in China has shown an increased development trend. The exponential growth of energy supply caused by rapid economic development and severe haze condition in China have led biogas to become the better eco-friendly energy for the rural areas. In Qing county, Hebei Province, the technology of using crop straw as a main material to generate biogas is currently developing. China had 26.5 million biogas plants, with an output of 10.5 billion cubic meter biogas until 2007. The annual biogas output has increased to 248 billion cubic meter in 2010. The Chinese government had supported and funded rural biogas projects. As of 2023, more than 30 million rural Chinese households use biogas digesters. During the winter, the biogas production in northern regions of China is lower. This is caused by the lack of heat control technology for digesters thus the co-digestion of different feedstock failed to complete in the cold environment.

Biogas had first been utilized in China during the 1920s when engineer Luo Guorui started small-scale experiments with it. Lack of government support for the technology during the Republic of China era and high costs hampered the technology's uptake at the time, and in 1942 the invading Japanese army burned down Luo's headquarters, ending these early experiments.

=== Developing countries ===
In August 1979, the United Nations Environment Programme held a month-long biogas training seminar in Sichuan province, China, which hosted representatives from 18 developing countries.

Domestic biogas plants convert livestock manure and night soil into biogas and slurry, the fermented manure. This technology is feasible for small-holders with livestock producing 50 kg manure per day, an equivalent of about 6 pigs or 3 cows. This manure has to be collectable to mix it with water and feed it into the plant. Toilets can be connected. Another precondition is the temperature that affects the fermentation process. With an optimum at 36 °C the technology especially applies for those living in a (sub) tropical climate. This makes the technology for small holders in developing countries often suitable.

Depending on size and location, a typical brick made fixed dome biogas plant can be installed at the yard of a rural household with the investment between US$300 to $500 in Asian countries and up to $1400 in the African context. A high quality biogas plant needs minimum maintenance costs and can produce gas for at least 15–20 years without major problems and re-investments. For the user, biogas provides clean cooking energy, reduces indoor air pollution, and reduces the time needed for traditional biomass collection, especially for women and children. The slurry is a clean organic fertilizer that potentially increases agricultural productivity. In developing countries, it was also determined that the use of biogas leads to a 20% reduction in GHG emissions compared with GHG emissions due to firewood. Moreover, GHG emissions of 384.1 kg CO_{2} equivalent per year per animal could be prevented.

Energy is an important part of modern society and can serve as one of the most important indicators of socio-economic development. As much as there have been advancements in technology, even so, some three billion people, primarily in the rural areas of developing countries, continue to access their energy needs for cooking through traditional means by burning biomass resources like firewood, crop residues and animal dung in crude traditional stoves.

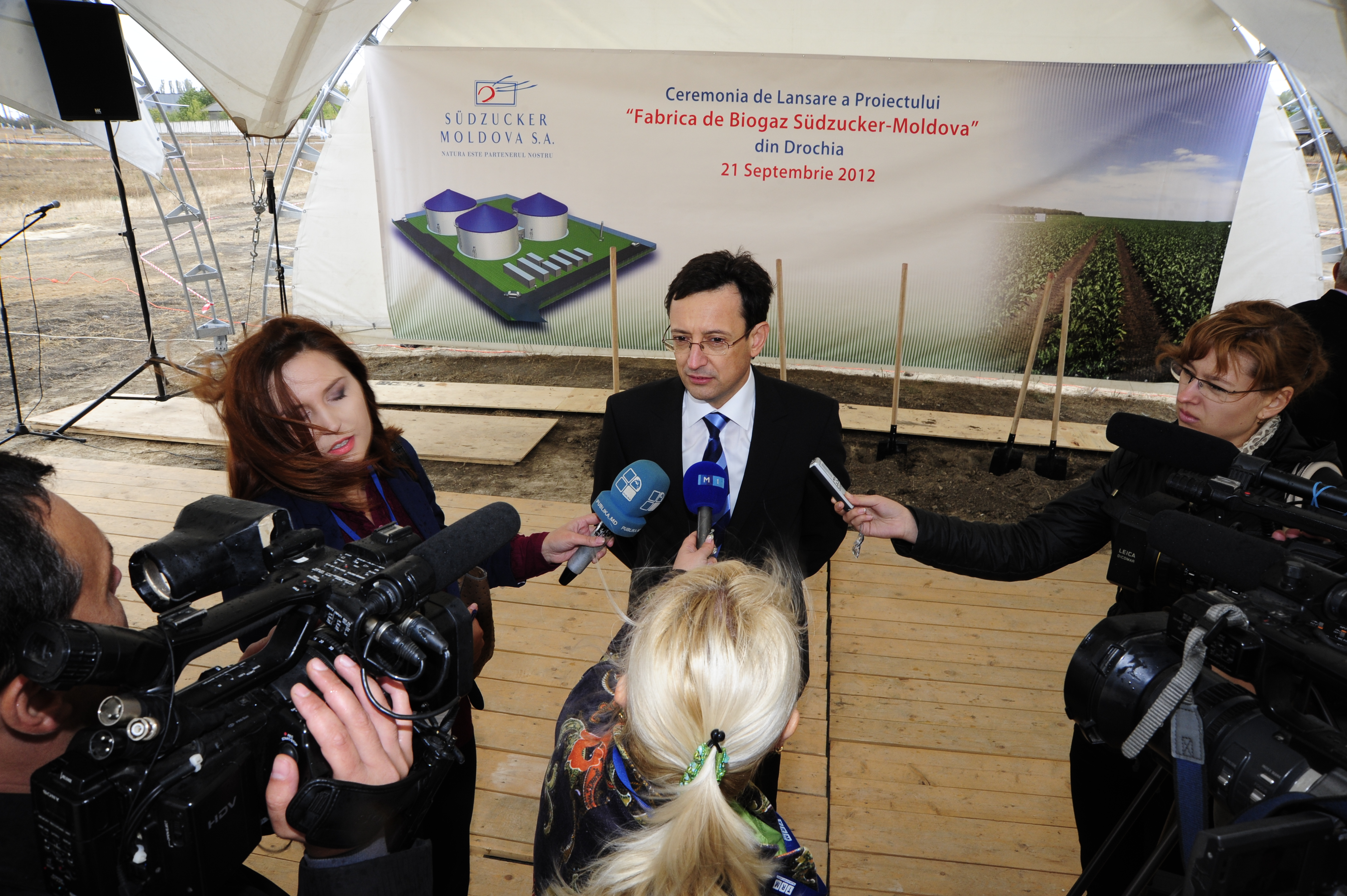
Inauguration of a Südzucker biogas plant in Drochia with interview of Octavian Armașu, 2012.

Domestic biogas technology is a proven and established technology in many parts of the world, especially Asia. Several countries in this region have embarked on large-scale programmes on domestic biogas, such as China and India. The Netherlands Development Organisation, SNV, supports national programmes on domestic biogas that aim to establish commercial-viable domestic biogas sectors in which local companies market, install and service biogas plants for households. In Asia, SNV is working in Nepal, Vietnam, Bangladesh, Bhutan, Cambodia, Lao PDR, Pakistan and Indonesia, and in Africa; Rwanda, Senegal, Burkina Faso, Ethiopia, Tanzania, Uganda, Kenya, Benin and Cameroon. In South Africa a prebuilt Biogas system is manufactured and sold. One key feature is that installation requires less skill and is quicker to install as the digester tank is premade plastic.

Biogas systems play a very significant role in access to energy across many low and middle income countries (LMICs), especially in areas that are lacking reliable electricity and fuels for cooking. Small scale digesters are often seen at the household and community level to convert animal manure, agricultural residues, and organic household waste into methane rich gas that can be used for cooking, lighting as well as heating.

=== Europe ===
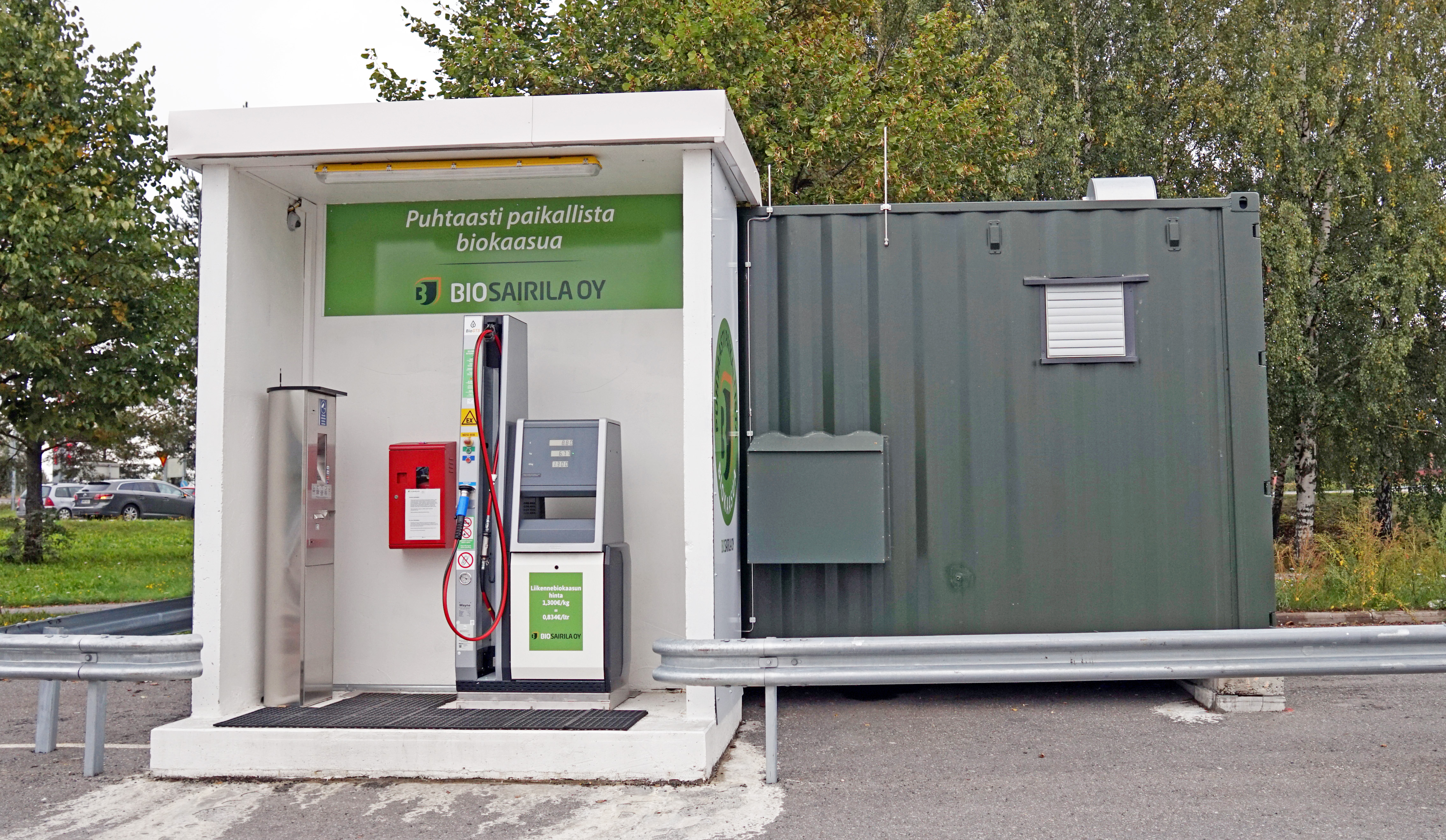
Biogas fueling station in Mikkeli, Finland

The level of development varies greatly in Europe. While countries such as Germany, Austria, Sweden and Italy are fairly advanced in their use of biogas, there is a vast potential for this renewable energy source in the rest of the continent, especially in Eastern Europe. MT-Energie is a German biogas technology company operating in the field of renewable energies. Different legal frameworks, education schemes and the availability of technology are among the prime reasons behind this untapped potential. Another challenge for the further progression of biogas has been negative public perception.

In February 2009, the European Biogas Association (EBA) was founded in Brussels as a non-profit organisation to promote the deployment of sustainable biogas production and use in Europe. EBA's strategy defines three priorities: establish biogas as an important part of Europe's energy mix, promote source separation of household waste to increase the gas potential, and support the production of biomethane as vehicle fuel. In July 2013, it had 60 members from 24 countries across Europe.

The European Union (EU) has legislation regarding waste management and landfill sites called the Landfill Directive. Countries such as the United Kingdom and Germany now have legislation in force that provides farmers with long-term revenue and energy security. The EU mandates that internal combustion engines with biogas have ample gas pressure to optimize combustion, and within the European Union ATEX centrifugal fan units built in accordance with the European directive 2014–34/EU (previously 94/9/EG) are obligatory. These centrifugal fan units, for example Combimac, Meidinger AG or Witt & Sohn AG are suitable for use in Zone 1 and 2 .

==== UK ====
As of September 2013, there are about 130 non-sewage biogas plants in the UK. Most are on-farm, and some larger facilities exist off-farm, which are taking food and consumer wastes. On 5 October 2010, biogas was injected into the UK gas grid for the first time. Sewage from over 30,000 Oxfordshire homes is sent to Didcot sewage treatment works, where it is treated in an anaerobic digestor to produce biogas, which is then cleaned to provide gas for approximately 200 homes. In 2015 the Green-Energy company Ecotricity announced their plans to build three grid-injecting digesters.

==== Italy ====
In Italy the biogas industry first started in 2008, thanks to the introduction of advantageous feed tariffs. They were later replaced by feed-in premiums and the preference was given to by products and farming waste and leading to stagnation in biogas production and derived heat and electricity since 2012.As of September 2018, in Italy there are more than 200 biogas plants with a production of about 1.2 GW

==== Germany ====
Germany is Europe's biggest biogas producer and the market leader in biogas technology. In 2010 there were 5,905 biogas plants operating throughout the country: Lower Saxony, Bavaria, and the eastern federal states are the main regions. Most of these plants are employed as power plants. Usually the biogas plants are directly connected with a CHP which produces electric power by burning the bio methane. The electrical power is then fed into the public power grid. In 2010, the total installed electrical capacity of these power plants was 2,291 MW. The electricity supply was approximately 12.8 TWh, which is 12.6% of the total generated renewable electricity. Biogas in Germany is primarily extracted by the co-fermentation of energy crops (called 'NawaRo', an abbreviation of nachwachsende Rohstoffe, German for renewable resources) mixed with manure. The main crop used is corn. Organic waste and industrial and agricultural residues such as waste from the food industry are also used for biogas generation. In this respect, biogas production in Germany differs significantly from the UK, where biogas generated from landfill sites is most common.

Biogas production in Germany has developed rapidly over the last 20 years. The main reason is the legally created frameworks. Government support of renewable energy started in 1991 with the Electricity Feed-in Act (StrEG). This law guaranteed the producers of energy from renewable sources the feed into the public power grid, thus the power companies were forced to take all produced energy from independent private producers of green energy. In 2000 the Electricity Feed-in Act was replaced by the Renewable Energy Sources Act (EEG). This law even guaranteed a fixed compensation for the produced electric power over 20 years. The amount of around 8 ¢/kWh gave farmers the opportunity to become energy suppliers and gain a further source of income.

The German agricultural biogas production was given a further push in 2004 by implementing the so-called NawaRo-Bonus. This is a special payment given for the use of renewable resources, that is, energy crops. In 2007 the German government stressed its intention to invest further effort and support in improving the renewable energy supply to provide an answer on growing climate challenges and increasing oil prices by the Integrated Climate and Energy Programme. This continual trend of renewable energy promotion induces a number of challenges facing the management and organisation of renewable energy supply that has also several impacts on the biogas production. The first challenge to be noticed is the high area-consuming of the biogas electric power supply. In 2011 energy crops for biogas production consumed an area of circa 800,000 ha in Germany. This high demand of agricultural areas generates new competitions with the food industries that did not exist hitherto. Moreover, new industries and markets were created in predominately rural regions entailing different new players with an economic, political and civil background. Their influence and acting has to be governed to gain all advantages this new source of energy is offering. Finally biogas will furthermore play an important role in the German renewable energy supply if good governance is focused.

=== India ===
Biogas in India has been traditionally based on dairy manure as feed stock and these "gobar" gas plants have been in operation for a long period of time, especially in rural India. In India, early development of biogas technology during the mid-20th century included experimental and demonstration work by engineers and researchers promoting “gobar gas” systems for rural energy use. Among these was Dr. Ram Bux Singh, who established an early successful biogas plant in 1957 in Sitapur, Uttar Pradesh, and later contributed to applied research and dissemination of biogas systems through work associated with the Gobar Gas Research Station at Ajitmal. His technical work formed part of India’s early efforts to promote decentralized renewable energy solutions based on agricultural waste. In the last 2–3 decades, research organisations with a focus on rural energy security have enhanced the design of the systems resulting in newer efficient low cost designs such as the Deenabandhu model. The Deenabandhu Model is a new biogas-production model popular in India. (Deenabandhu means "friend of the helpless".) The unit usually has a capacity of 2 to 3 cubic metres. It is constructed using bricks or by a ferrocement mixture. In India, the brick model costs slightly more than the ferrocement model; however, India's Ministry of New and Renewable Energy offers some subsidy per model constructed.

Biogas which is mainly methane/natural gas can also be used for generating protein rich cattle, poultry and fish feed in villages economically by cultivating Methylococcus capsulatus bacteria culture with tiny land and water foot print. The carbon dioxide gas produced as by product from these plants can be put to use in cheaper production of algae oil or spirulina from algaculture particularly in tropical countries like India which can displace the prime position of crude oil in near future. Union government of India is implementing many schemes to utilise productively the agro waste or biomass in rural areas to uplift rural economy and job potential. With these plants, the non-edible biomass or waste of edible biomass is converted in to high value products without any water pollution or green house gas (GHG) emissions.

LPG (Liquefied Petroleum Gas) is a key source of cooking fuel in urban India and its prices have been increasing along with the global fuel prices. Also the heavy subsidies provided by the successive governments in promoting LPG as a domestic cooking fuel has become a financial burden renewing the focus on biogas as a cooking fuel alternative in urban establishments. This has led to the development of prefabricated digester for modular deployments as compared to RCC and cement structures which take a longer duration to construct. Renewed focus on process technology like the Biourja process model has enhanced the stature of medium and large scale anaerobic digester in India as a potential alternative to LPG as primary cooking fuel.

In India, Nepal, Pakistan and Bangladesh biogas produced from the anaerobic digestion of manure in small-scale digestion facilities is called gobar gas; it is estimated that such facilities exist in over 2 million households in India, 50,000 in Bangladesh and thousands in Pakistan, particularly North Punjab, due to the thriving population of livestock. The digester is an airtight circular pit made of concrete with a pipe connection. The manure is directed to the pit, usually straight from the cattle shed. The pit is filled with a required quantity of wastewater. The gas pipe is connected to the kitchen fireplace through control valves. The combustion of this biogas has very little odour or smoke. Owing to simplicity in implementation and use of cheap raw materials in villages, it is one of the most environmentally sound energy sources for rural needs. One type of these system is the Sintex Digester. Some designs use vermiculture to further enhance the slurry produced by the biogas plant for use as compost. In Pakistan, the Rural Support Programmes Network is running the Pakistan Domestic Biogas Programme which has installed 5,360 biogas plants and has trained in excess of 200 masons on the technology and aims to develop the Biogas Sector in Pakistan. In Nepal, the government provides subsidies to build biogas plant at home.

=== United States ===
With the many benefits of biogas, it is starting to become a popular source of energy and is starting to be used in the United States more. In 2003, the United States consumed 43 TWh (147 trillion BTU) of energy from "landfill gas", about 0.6% of the total U.S. natural gas consumption. Methane biogas derived from cow manure is being tested in the U.S. According to a 2008 study, collected by the Science and Children magazine, methane biogas from cow manure would be sufficient to produce 100 billion kilowatt hours enough to power millions of homes across America. Furthermore, methane biogas has been tested to prove that it can reduce 99 million metric tons of greenhouse gas emissions or about 4% of the greenhouse gases produced by the United States.

The number of farm-based digesters increased by 21% in 2021 according to the American Biogas Council. In Vermont biogas generated on dairy farms was included in the CVPS Cow Power program. The program was originally offered by Central Vermont Public Service Corporation as a voluntary tariff and now with a recent merger with Green Mountain Power is now the GMP Cow Power Program. Customers can elect to pay a premium on their electric bill, and that premium is passed directly to the farms in the program. In Sheldon, Vermont, Green Mountain Dairy has provided renewable energy as part of the Cow Power program. It started when the brothers who own the farm, Bill and Brian Rowell, wanted to address some of the manure management challenges faced by dairy farms, including manure odor, and nutrient availability for the crops they need to grow to feed the animals. They installed an anaerobic digester to process the cow and milking center waste from their 950 cows to produce renewable energy, a bedding to replace sawdust, and a plant-friendly fertilizer. The energy and environmental attributes are sold to the GMP Cow Power program. On average, the system run by the Rowells produces enough electricity to power 300 to 350 other homes. The generator capacity is about 300 kilowatts.

In Hereford, Texas, cow manure is being used to power an ethanol power plant. By switching to methane biogas, the ethanol power plant has saved 1000 barrels of oil a day. Over all, the power plant has reduced transportation costs and will be opening many more jobs for future power plants that will rely on biogas. In Oakley, Kansas, an ethanol plant considered to be one of the largest biogas facilities in North America is using integrated manure utilization system to produce heat for its boilers by utilizing feedlot manure, municipal organics and ethanol plant waste. At full capacity the plant is expected to replace 90% of the fossil fuel used in the manufacturing process of ethanol and methanol. In California, the Southern California Gas Company has advocated for mixing biogas into existing natural gas pipelines. However, California state officials have taken the position that biogas is "better used in hard-to-electrify sectors of the economy-- like aviation, heavy industry and long-haul trucking".

The United States legislates against landfill gas as it contains VOCs. The United States Clean Air Act and Title 40 of the Code of Federal Regulations (CFR) requires landfill owners to estimate the quantity of non-methane organic compounds (NMOCs) emitted. If the estimated NMOC emissions exceeds 50 tonnes per year, the landfill owner is required to collect the gas and treat it to remove the entrained NMOCs. That usually means burning it. Because of the remoteness of landfill sites, it is sometimes not economically feasible to produce electricity from the gas. There are a variety of grants and loans that support the development of anaerobic digestor systems. The Rural Energy for American Program provides loan financing and grant funding for biogas systems, as does the Environmental Quality Incentives Program, Conservation Stewardship Program, and Conservation Loan Program.

=== Zambia ===
Lusaka, the capital city of Zambia, has two million inhabitants with over half of the population residing in peri-urban areas. The majority of this population use pit latrines as toilets generating approximately 22,680 tons of fecal sludge per annum. This sludge is inadequately managed: Over 60% of the generated faecal sludge remains within the residential environment thereby compromising both the environment and public health.

In the face of research work and implementation of biogas having started as early as in the 1980s, Zambia is lagging behind in the adoption and use of biogas in the sub-Saharan Africa. Animal manure and crop residues are required for the provision of energy for cooking and lighting. Inadequate funding, absence of policy, regulatory framework and strategies on biogas, unfavorable investor monetary policy, inadequate expertise, lack of awareness of the benefits of biogas technology among leaders, financial institutions and locals, resistance to change due cultural and traditions of the locals, high installation and maintenance costs of biogas digesters, inadequate research and development, improper management and lack of monitoring of installed digesters, complexity of the carbon market, lack of incentives and social equity are among the challenges that have impeded the acquiring and sustainable implementation of domestic biogas production in Zambia.

== Household level and decentralized systems ==
Unlike many of the large industrial plants common in high income countries, many LMIC biogas initiatives focus on emphasizing decentralized production and potential benefits. Household digesters can provide a source of energy that is independent of centralized grids while also producing rich digestate that can be used as fertilizer. These systems are found in regions that have lots of livestock owners including parts of South Asia, East Africa and China. Decentralized biogas systems are often seen as a way to address multiple development goals at the same time. This includes improving energy access, sanitation improvement, reduction of indoor air pollution from traditional biomass fuels and improving regional energy sovereignty.

== Geographic and social/economic factors ==
The rate of effectiveness for biogas systems can vary widely depending on different geographic and social/economic conditions. Some of the biggest determinants of effectiveness are connected to climate, water availability, feedstock supply, and household income. Microbial activity increases with temperature and generally favors hotter climates, reducing the need for supplemental heating. The density of livestock is another critical factor because manure is the most common feedstock for these small digesters. Regions that have dispersed populations or limited animal ownership may face more challenges maintaining consistent energy production. Access to technical and maintenance services can also influence the long term success and adoption rates.

== Feedstocks and Agricultural systems ==
Biogas feedstocks in LMIC regions usually consist of locally available organic waste rather than purposefully grown energy crops. Some common feedstock inputs include cattle dung, poultry manure, crop residues, food waste and other biodegradable materials. By utilizing these waste streams regions can provide environmental benefits through the process of capturing methane that would otherwise be released through unmanaged decomposition. It can also improve sanitation and agricultural production through the use of digestate as a fertilizer. In high income countries there is more reliance on dedicated energy crops like corn and soy. Some comparative studies show that waste based systems can be more appropriate in resource constrained environments where land, water and finances are limited.

== Limitations and Challenges ==
Despite many potential benefits, small biogas systems still face several barriers before widespread adoption can happen. High installation costs can be problematic especially in low income households and increasingly difficult without government support programs and grants. Seasonal variability in feedstock availability and water scarcity can also reduce gas production at times and is largely affected by climate related factors. Another issue occurs when digesters are not maintained because of a lack of technical support making repairs difficult. Research initiatives in sub-Saharan Africa and South Asia have shown that technical feasibility alone cannot guarantee sustained use. These systems also need to be socially accepted and supported through training programs, institutional support and policy frameworks. Regions that implement community engagement alongside technical deployment often see higher adoption and long term operation rates.

== Emerging alternative energy feedstocks ==
Outside some of the more traditionally waste based inputs like manure and food residues, researchers have also investigated biomass crops for anaerobic digestion with lots of promises. Some perennial grasses including switchgrass (Panicum virgatum), miscanthus (Miscanthus giganteus), and Napier grass (Cenchrus purpureus) have experienced lots of recent attention due to their high biomass yields in comparison to typical biofuel crops as well as the ability to grow on marginal land with relatively low speaking input requirements.

== Associations ==
- World Biogas Association (https://www.worldbiogasassociation.org/)
- Anaerobic Digestion and Bioresources Association (United Kingdom) (https://adbioresources.org/)
- American Biogas Council (https://americanbiogascouncil.org/)
- Canadian Biogas Association (https://www.biogasassociation.ca/)
- European Biogas Association
- German Biogas Association
- Indian Biogas Association

== Society and culture ==
Contemporary biogas production provides new opportunities for skilled employment, drawing on the development of new technologies.

== See also ==
- Anaerobic digestion – Oxygen-free break down of material
- Biochemical oxygen demand – Oxygen needed to remove organics from water
- Biodegradability – Decomposition by living organisms
- Bioenergy – Renewable energy made from biomass
- Biofuel – Fuel derived from biological sources
- Biohydrogen – Hydrogen that is produced biologically
- Hydrogen economy – Using hydrogen to decarbonize more sectors
- Landfill gas monitoring
- Methanation – Conversion of carbon monoxide and carbon dioxide (CO_{x}) to methane (CH_{4})
- MSW/LFG (municipal solid waste and landfill gas)
- Natural gas – Gaseous fossil fuel
- Renewable energy – Energy collected from renewable resources
- Renewable natural gas – Methane-enriched biogas
- Relative cost of electricity generated by different sources – Comparison of costs of different electricity generation sources
- Thermal hydrolysis
- Waste management – Activities and actions required to manage waste from its source to its final disposal
- European Biomass Association – European bioenergy organisation
