= Renewable natural gas =

Methane-enriched biogas

Renewable natural gas (RNG), also known as biomethane, is a renewable fuel made from biogas that has been upgraded to a quality similar to fossil natural gas and has a methane concentration of 90% or greater. By removing carbon dioxide and other impurities from biogas, the concentration of methane is high enough that it becomes possible to distribute RNG via existing gas pipeline infrastructure. RNG can be used in existing appliances, including vehicles with natural gas burning engines (natural gas vehicles).

The most common way of collecting biogas with which to produce biomethane is through the process of anaerobic digestion. Anaerobic digestion facilities are either purpose built such as facilities that digest manure, household organic waste, or wastewater treatment plants. Biogas is also byproduct of the decomposition of organic materials in landfills.

RNG can also be produced through the methanation of carbon dioxide/monoxide and hydrogen using either biomethanation, the Sabatier process or through electrochemical cells similar to fuel cells. These approaches can be used to methanate carbon dioxide from carbon capture facilities or synthetic gas (syngas) produced from the gasification of wood or other lignocellulosic materials. These approaches to producing RNG are still being developed and account for a small fraction of global production.

== Production ==
=== Generation of biogas and syngas ===
Most RNG is made from biogas produced via anaerobic digestion of organic waste. Biogas is produced as a byproduct of landfilling and wastewater treatment. At landfills, buried organic waste undergoes anaerobic digestion producing biogas that can be collected through a series of wells installed in the landfill. Wastewater treatment facilities often use anaerobic digestion tanks to degrade sludge from settling tanks. Wastewater treatment plants with anaerobic digesters often use biogas for process heat and flare excess biogas. Landfills in some jurisdictions are required to capture biogas to minimize methane leakage into the atmosphere, the captured gas is either flared, combusted to produce electricity, or upgraded into RNG.

Anaerobic digesters can also be purpose-built facilities to produce RNG. Anaerobic digesters typically handle waste biomass from agricultural and municipal sources. Agricultural wastes include manure, spoiled products, and animal bedding. Municipal wastes include source separated organic wastes, fats, oils, and greases (FOG), and industrial byproducts. In some regions, non-waste feedstocks are also used. These feedstocks can be energy crops, such as maize and barley, or cover crops that are grown outside of the growing season to improve soil quality. In France, regulations limit the amount of energy crops that can be used for producing biogas, which has encouraged the use of cover crops. Depending on the availability of biomass feedstocks, the feedstock is processed in a dedicated facility or co-processes with other types of feedstock.

Commercial anaerobic digesters typically make money through a combination of selling RNG, selling digestate, and by charging tipping fees for waste disposal. Costs are minimized by maximizing production scale and by locating an anaerobic digestion plant next to transport links (e.g. a port or highway) for the chosen source of biomass. Selecting a site close the gas transmission or distribution grid is also important to reduce interconnection costs. Gas storage is often required to deal with periods of low gas demand during the summer, depending on the region.

RNG can also be produced via methanization of either carbon dioxide or syngas produced via thermal gasification. Both approaches are still largely pre-commercial and do not represent a major source of RNG production globally.

=== Upgrading to RNG ===
Raw biogas is a mixture of primarily methane and carbon dioxide at a ratio of approximately 60:40. Biogas can also contain small amounts of oxygen and nitrogen pulled in from air and is typically saturated with water. All biogas sources contain hydrogen sulphide and biogas produced from waste water treatment or landfills will often contain siloxanes and other volatile organic components.

Biogas upgrading refers to the removal of trace contaminants, water, and non-methane gases from biogas to produce a product that is interchangeable with natural gas. Biogas upgrading has two general steps - removal of contaminants and water, followed by gas separation. Contaminants and water are typically removed with sacrificial media beds containing activated carbon, activated alumina, and iron oxide. Contaminants can also be removed through biological scrubbing using sulphur oxidizing bacteria, chemical scrubbing with ammonia, or using regenerative process such as temperature swing adsorption.

After contaminants and water have been removed, biogas undergoes gas separation to concentrate methane. There are multiple methods of gas separation used in biogas upgrading:

- Membrane separation uses hollow fibres to separate gases using molecular size differences.
- Pressure swing adsorption separates gases based on their affinity for particular media such as zeolites or carbon molecular sieves. During the high pressure phase, one gas is trapped in the media and the product gas exits the vessel. The media is then regenerated with a vacuum to remove the other gas.
- Chemical washing uses either ammonia or water to dissolve carbon dioxide. The chemical is then regenerate through flashing or heating.

== Compatibility with natural gas infrastructure ==
RNG is generally considered to be interchangeable with natural gas. Many regions have minimum specifications for RNG quality that is deemed acceptable for local natural gas infrastructure. The major difference between RNG and natural gas is that RNG does not contain any hydrocarbons (such as propane) other than methane. This results in RNG having a lower heating value and Wobbe index than natural gas.

Table 1: RNG composition specifications by region
Component	Unit	CGA	BNQ	SoCal Gas
Higher heating value	MJ/Sm^{3}	>36	>36	>36.8
Wobbe index	MJ/Sm^{3}	>47.23	>47.23	
Carbon dioxide	mol%	<2	<2	<3
Total inerts	mol%	<4	<4	<4
Oxygen	mol%	<0.4	<0.4	<0.2
Hydrogen sulfide	mg/Sm^{3}	<7 (distribution) <23 (transmission	<7 (distribution) <23 (transmission)	<6
Water content	mg/Sm^{3}	<35 (distribution) <65 (transmission)	<35 (distribution) <65 (transmission)	
Halocarbons	mg/Sm^{3}	10	10	
Siloxanes	ppm	<1	<1.5	

== Commercial development ==
=== Overall ===
As of 2023, more than 300 RNG facilities are currently operational in North America, with more than 70% of supplies drawn from the municipal solid waste and landfill sectors, according to the U.S. trade group RNG Coalition.

=== Landfill Gas ===
In North America, most RNG development has historically developed as a form of landfill gas utilization. The first commercial RNG facility was launched at the Fresh Kills landfill near New York City in 1982. Landfill gas projects were the dominant type of RNG in the United States project up until 2021, when agricultural projects became the dominant type of RNG production. As of 2023, there are 102 landfill RNG projects in the United States.

=== Wastewater treatment plants ===
Sludge settled during the processing of wastewater can be degraded in an anaerobic digester. The use of anaerobic digesters in a popular method of treating sludge because it produces biogas, which can be used to produce heat for wastewater treatment facility. Many wastewater treatment plants produce more biogas than they plant consumes. This gas is either flared to destroy methane, used in a combined heat and power engine, or upgraded to RNG.

=== Agricultural anaerobic digesters ===
Anaerobic digesters can be integrated into farming operations. Typically, the base feedstock for an agricultural anaerobic digester is manure. Manure provides a colony of micro-organisms for anaerobic digestion and a regular supply of liquid feedstock slurry. Farms will often add other wastes like spoiled produce or animal bedding. Depending on the region, agricultural projects may accept some off-farm feedstocks. Anaerobic digesters on farms treat wastes, produce liquid digestate that can be used as fertilizer, and create an additional revenue stream for farmers.

=== Municipal anaerobic digesters ===
Municipal anaerobic digesters refer to facilities where the main feedstock is source separated organics (SSO) collected through green bin programs. These digesters differ from agricultural digesters because SSO feedstocks tend to have a higher solids content than manure. Municipal anaerobic digesters often need pretreatment to remove contaminants such as plastic and glass containers. Municipalities operate anaerobic digesters as a form of organic waste diversion from landfills to reduce methane emissions.

=== RNG from Syngas ===
Syngas is a mixture of primarily methane, hydrogen, carbon dioxide and carbon monoxide. Similarly to biogas, syngas can be combusted directly or reformed in to RNG or hydrogen. The process start with the production of syngas, typically woody biomass, through gasification or pyrolysis. Syngas is then cleaned of contaminants such as hydrogen sulfide and tar. To upgrade syngas, the ratio of hydrogen to carbon monoxide is increased using the water gas shift reaction. With close to the stoichiometric ratio, the syngas is reformed into methane using the Sabatier reaction and then carbon dioxide is removed using similar techniques to biogas upgrading.

Renewable natural gas plants based on wood can be categorized into two main categories, one being allothermal, which has the energy provided by a source outside of the gasifier. One example is the double-chambered fluidized bed gasifiers consisting of a separate combustion and gasification chambers. Autothermal systems generate the heat within the gasifier, but require the use of pure oxygen to avoid nitrogen dilution.

Core advantage of producing RNG from wood wastes is a higher efficiency that Fisher-Tropsch based liquid fuels production and smaller-production scale than other second generation biofuel production systems. The Energy Research Centre of the Netherlands has conducted extensive research on large-scale RNG production from woody biomass, based on the importation of feedstocks from abroad.

== Growth Outlook ==
Renewable natural gas can be produced and distributed via the existing gas grid, making it an attractive means of supplying existing premises with renewable heat and renewable gas energy. Renewable natural gas can also be converted into liquefied natural gas (LNG) or compressed natural gas (CNG) for direct use as fuel in transport sector.

In the United States, projections of the ultimate supply potential for RNG vary. An analysis conducted in 2011 by the Gas Technology Institute determined that renewable gas from waste biomass including agricultural waste has the potential to add up to 2.5 quadrillion Btu annually, being enough to meet the natural gas needs of 50% of American homes. The Environmental and Energy Study Institute estimated that renewable natural gas could replace up to 10% of all natural gas used in the United States, and a study by the National Association of Clean Water Agencies and the Water Environment Federation found that the quantity of biosolids removed from wastewater could be turned into enough biogas to potentially meet up to 12% of America's national electricity demand.

More recently, a study commissioned by the American Gas Foundation and executed by ICF in 2019 projected that between 1.6-3.78 trillion cubic feet of RNG could be produced annually for pipeline injection in the U.S. by 2030.

In combination with power-to-gas, whereby the carbon dioxide and carbon monoxide fraction of biogas are converted to methane using electrolyzed hydrogen, the renewable gas potential of raw biogas is approximately doubled.

=== RNG development by region ===
In the UK, using anaerobic digestion is growing as a means of producing renewable biogas, with nearly 90 biomethane injection sites built across the country. Ecotricity announced plans to supply green gas to UK consumers via the national grid. Centrica also announced that it would begin injecting gas, manufactured from sewage, into the gas grid.

In Canada, FortisBC, a gas provider in British Columbia, injects renewably created natural gas into its existing gas distribution system.

A company called Divert, which also reduces food waste through donation, says it will use a $1 billion investment from Canadian pipeline operator Enbridge to scale its existing network of food waste anaerobic digesters to cover all major markets of North America.

In Sweden, Göteborg Energi opened the first demonstration plant for large scale production of bio-synthetic natural gas (SNG) through gasification of forest residues in Gothenburg, Sweden within the GoBiGas project. The plant had the capacity to produce 20 megawatts-worth of bioSNG from about 30 MW-worth of biomass, aiming at a conversion efficiency of 65%. From December 2014 the bioSNG plant was fully operational and supplied gas to the Swedish natural gas grid, reaching the quality demands with a methane content of over 95%. The plant was permanently closed due to economic problems in April 2018. Göteborg Energi had invested 175 million euro in the plant and intensive attempts for a year to sell the plant to new investors had failed.

== Environmental concerns ==
Biogas creates similar environmental pollutants as ordinary natural gas fuel, such as carbon monoxide, sulfur dioxide, nitrogen oxide, hydrogen sulfide and particulates. Any unburned gas that escapes contains methane, a long lived greenhouse gas. The key difference from fossil natural gas is that it is often considered partly or fully carbon neutral, since the carbon dioxide contained in the biomass is naturally renewed in each generation of plants, rather than being released from fossil stores and increasing atmospheric carbon dioxide.

A major concern is that the potential biogas yield would only represent a small percentage of existing supplies of fossil gas (also called natural gas). This fact has led existing natural gas suppliers to push back against measures to increase the use of electricity as an energy supply - decreasing demand for gas. This reality prompted Southern California Gas Company (SoCalGas) to covertly support the creation of a nonprofit: Californians for Balanced Energy Solutions (C4Bes) which then went on to lobby for the gas sector and against the momentum in favor of electrification. The Sierra Club exposed the hand of SoCalGas in the formation of C4Bes (astroturfing) and so C4Bes curtailed its lobbying activities, although it continued to promote demand for gas.

== See also ==
- Anaerobic digestion
- Biogas upgrader
- Biogas
- Carbon-neutral fuel
- Issues relating to biofuels
- Landfill gas utilization
- Power-to-gas
- Renewable energy
- Sustainable energy
