= Divert (company) =

American technology company

Divert, Inc.
- Formerly: Feed Resource Recovery
- Type: Private
- Industry: Waste management; Renewable energy; Impact investing
- Founded: June 2007
- Founders: Ryan Begin; Nick Whitman
- Headquarters: West Concord, Massachusetts, United States
- Area served: United States
- Key people: Ryan Begin (CEO); Nick Whitman (COO)
- Products: Anaerobic digestion facilities; food waste tracking systems
- Services: Food waste recycling; Renewable natural gas production; sustainability logistics
- Owners: Ara Partners
- Number of employees: 250+ (2022)

Divert, Inc. is an American impact technology company that works to eliminate wasted food and create sustainable infrastructure to reduce the impact of waste on the environment and society.

The West Concord, Massachusetts-company was established in June 2007 by Ryan Begin and Nick Whitman, who have since served as the CEO and COO, respectively. The company rebranded as Divert, Inc. in 2016, and as of 2022 had more than 250 employees serving 5,500 retail locations across the United States. As of May 2024, the company has 6,600 customer locations across the US. In 2024 Divert stated that they had processed more than 2.3 billion pounds of food since the company was launched in 2007.

== History and funding ==
Divert was founded in June 2007 as Feed Resource Recovery by Ryan Begin and Nick Whitman at the back of a grocery store in Burlington, Massachusetts, to help them process wasted food. In April, 2012, Divert partnered with Kroger in developing a $20 million anaerobic digestion facility for 330 stores in Compton, California. In 2016 they worked with Stop & Shop in establishing their second anaerobic digestion facility in Freetown, Massachusetts.

In 2021, Divert was acquired by Ara Partners, a global private equity firm, specializing in industrial decarbonization investments. As a part of the acquisition, Divert received $100 million in growth equity led by Ara in conjunction with Singapore's sovereign wealth fund, GIC, and Ontario Power Generation. In October 2022, the company announced a 10-year renewable natural gas (RNG) offtake agreement with bp worth approximately $175 million. Under this agreement, bp will purchase RNG generated from three Divert facilities, which has the potential to offset 36,905 metric tons of carbon dioxide per year. By the end of 2022, the company expanded to more than 1,500 new retail stores, bringing the total to nearly 5,400 retail stores with an additional 1,000 stores contracted for 2023.

In January 2023, the company announced that Nicholas Bertram, former president of The Giant Company and the CEO and President of Flashfood had joined its advisory board as its founding member. In March 2023, the company announced a $1 billion infrastructure development agreement with Enbridge, Inc., and $100 million in growth equity from Enbridge and current investor Ara Partners. The funding will go towards the development of anaerobic digesters across the U.S. to turn wasted food into renewable energy.

In April 2023, the company announced the groundbreaking on its Turlock, California food waste to renewable energy facility. Once fully operational in 2024, the facility should process 100,000 tons of wasted food each year. California State Treasurer Fiona Ma attended the groundbreaking ceremony and emphasized how Divert fits into the state's climate goals and new organic waste legislation. In September 2023, the company announced the groundbreaking on its Longview, Washington food waste to renewable energy facility, the first to be established in the state. The facility is projected to be able to process 100,000 tons of wasted food from Washington and Oregon into carbon-negative renewable energy annually.

== Products and services ==
Divert uses advanced technologies and sustainable infrastructure to address food waste, providing technology, logistics and anaerobic digestion facilities to help food retailers across the U.S. reach their sustainability goals. Divert utilizes Radio-frequency identification (RFID) technology to allow retailers to track their food waste on a monthly basis. Another core part of Divert's solution is anaerobic digestion. Unsold wasted food is processed to remove packaging before moving to Divert's anaerobic digesters to be turned into renewable energy.

As of February 2024 the company has 13 operational facilities across 25 states, and processed more than 384 million pounds of waste in 2023. In 2023 alone, Divert facilitated the donation of 200,000 meals more meals compared to 2022.

== Customers and partnerships ==
As of May 2024, Divert works with over 6,600 customer locations across the US, with customers such as Ahold Delhaize, Albertsons, Target, CVS, Kroger, and Safeway.

In June 2022, Divert launched a waste food recycling program with Giant Food, part of the Ahold Delhaize family of companies, to reduce the amount of organic waste going to landfill. The program has since expanded to 165 Giant Food stores across DC, Maryland, Virginia, and Delaware. In July 2023, the companies announced that more than 30.8 million pounds of wasted food had been processed during the first year of their partnership, which would have been responsible for over 1,400 metric tons of greenhouse gas emissions (GHG).

The company has partnerships with food banks and food recovery programs, such as the Central California Food Bank in Fresno, California, Feeding America Riverside San Bernardino in Riverside, California, and Second Harvest of the Greater Valley in Manteca, California.

For the Central California Food Bank, between 2018 and April 2023, Divert had sent nearly eight million pounds of food. West Coast-based CVS drug stores account for a significant percentage of this total, which typically deliver 400 large bins of food a week to the food bank a partner organization.

In April 2024, Divert's customer Kroger announced significant progress with its "Zero Hunger, Zero Waste" commitment, stating that it had achieved its objective of launching food waste recycling programs in 95% of their stores two years early.

Divert works to assist the grocery industry in achieving the United Nations and US objectives of reducing waste by 50% by 2030.
