= MSW/LFG =

MSW/LFG stands for municipal solid waste and landfill gas. The United States Environmental Protection Agency has several standards required for MSW landfills to help ensure public and environmental safety.

== See also ==
- List of waste management acronyms
