= Biogas upgrader =

Industrial renewable energy facility

A biogas upgrader is a facility that is used to concentrate the methane in biogas into biomethane, also known by its trade name as Renewable Natural Gas. Upgrading has three main functions: removal of trace contaminants, separation of non-methane gases, and drying. The purpose of upgrading biogas is to make biomethane that meets the quality specifications for the gas distribution grid or for use in compressed natural gas vehicles.

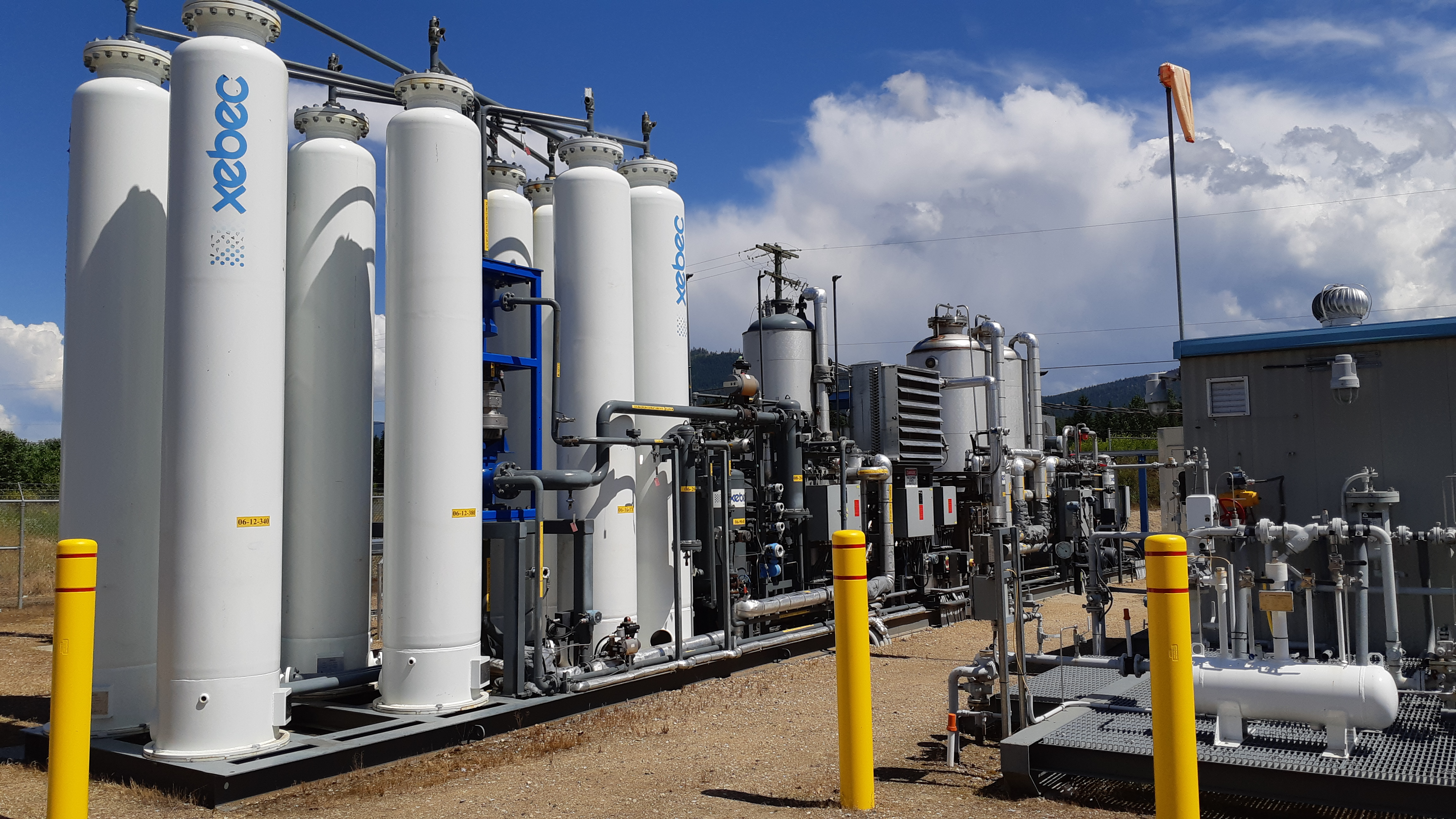
Biogas upgrader with pressure swing adsorption vessels

== Contaminant removal ==
Biogas contains several species of trace contaminants. Some of these contaminants such as hydrogen sulphide and ammonia are produced in the anaerobic digestion process. Other contaminant species are retained from the feedstock, this is especially common in biogas generated at landfills and wastewater treatment plants. These contaminants are broadly categorized as siloxanes and volatile organic compounds (VOCs). Removal of these contaminants is required to avoid poisoning subsequent gas separation equipment or to meet biomethane specifications.

=== Sacrificial media ===
Contaminant removal can be done using a sacrificial media where the contaminant species irreversibly adsorb onto the media or chemically react with the media. This media accumulates contaminants until it is saturated, at which point it is removed and replaced with a fresh media. Sacrificial media is often made from activated carbon sometimes impregnated with other components like activated alumina or iron oxide to improve selectivity.

=== Regenerative media ===
Some media types can be regenerated using temperature swing adsorption. In this process, adsorbed contaminants are released from the media when exposed to hot recirculating gas. The gas is then either chilled to deposit the contaminants or combusted to destroy the contaminants. This process extends the lifetime of the media.

=== Caustic and biological removal ===
Contaminant species such as hydrogen sulphide as soluble in water and can therefore be separated from biogas using a water wash. The dissolved contaminants in the water then have to be removed to regenerate the water to be used again. This can be done by using a based to react with the contaminant to form an insoluble species or by using microbes to metabolize the contaminant.

== Gas separation processes ==
Biogas contains a mixture of gas species. Methane is largest fraction and the goal of upgrading is to concentrate methane in the product stream. Carbon dioxide is the second most common species in biogas as it is also a product of anaerobic digestion process. Nitrogen and oxygen may also be present if air is introduced into the anaerobic digestion process. Air can be added to the process for intentional purposes such as oxidizing hydrogen sulphide or can infiltrate inadvertently.

=== Solvent washing ===
Solvent washing is the process of dissolving carbon dioxide and soluble contaminant species into a solvent. Pressurized biogas flows into a column with the solvent flowing in a counter current fashion. The solvent becomes saturated and is regenerated by either dropping the pressure or increasing the temperature to remove dissolved gases.

The most common solvent used in this process is water. Henry's Law dictates that gases dissolve in greater quantities at lower liquid temperatures, as such water wash systems typically operate below 10^{o}C, which allows for 2.5-3g of carbon dioxide to be removed per litre of water. Methane is sparingly soluble in water allowing concentrated methane to be collected in the product stream. Nitrogen and oxygen are also sparing soluble in water, which makes water washing ineffective for their removal.

Proprietary solvents can be used in place of water. Proprietary solvents are used because for great solubility capacities or selectivity for carbon dioxide or contaminant species. A common proprietary solvent is Selexol, which has a high capacity to dissolve hydrogen sulphide.

=== Pressure swing adsorption ===
Pressure swing adsorption (PSA) units use electrostatics and physical properties to adsorb gas species onto the surface of a media inside of a vessel. PSA units remove carbon dioxide through physical adsorption and remove nitrogen and oxygen using kinetic separation. The media used in PSA units is typically made from activated carbon, zeolites, or molecular sieves. Pressurized biogas flows through the vessel the target gas species is adsorbed or slowed by the media, allowing methane to permeate to the top of the vessel. Eventually the media becomes saturated and can no longer effectively separate gases. At this point, the media is regenerated by pulling a vacuum and desorbing gases on the media. The media can then be put back into service to treat more gas.

Pressure swing adsorption is a discontinuous process. PSA units work around this limitation by having multiple vessels, so that one vessel is always available to produce biomethane. PSA designs can either have valves dedicated to each vessel or a rotary valve system that connects to all vessels.

=== Amine gas treating ===
The chemistry involved in the amine gas treating varies somewhat with the particular amine being used. For one of the more common amines, monoethanolamine (MEA) denoted as RNH_{2}, the acid-base reaction involving the protonation of the amine electron pair to form a positively charged ammonium group (RNH^{+}_{3}) can be expressed as:

RNH_{2} + H_{2}S ⇌ RNH^{+}_{3} + HS^{−}
RNH_{2} + H_{2}CO_{3} ⇌ RNH^{+}_{3} + HCO^{−}_{3}

The resulting dissociated and ionized species being more soluble in solution are trapped, or scrubbed, by the amine solution and so easily removed from the gas phase. At the outlet of the amine scrubber, the sweetened gas is thus depleted in hydrogen sulphide and carbon dioxide.

A typical amine gas treating process includes an absorber unit and a regenerator unit as well as accessory equipment. In the absorber, the down flowing amine solution absorbs and reacts with hydrogen sulphide and carbon dioxide from the upflowing sour gas to produce a sweetened gas stream as a product and an amine solution rich in the absorbed acid gases. The resultant "rich" amine is then routed into the regenerator (a stripper with a reboiler) to produce regenerated or "lean" amine that is recycled for reuse in the absorber. The stripped overhead gas from the regenerator is concentrated hydrogen sulphide and carbon dioxide.

=== Membrane permeation ===
Membrane-based biogas upgrading systems utilize the different permeabilities of gases through a membrane fibre. Methane is the permeate and is able to pass freely through the membrane, while carbon dioxide is the retentate and unable to pass through the membrane. The retentate is collected from the sides of the membrane cartridge. Membrane separation is able to produce high purity methane in a single pass. However, the permeate can also be collected in the retentate stream since there is nothing inhibiting its flow. As a result, the retentate is frequently run through 1-2 additional membrane stages to achieve a higher biomethane recovery.

== Environmental considerations ==
Biomethane is a type of renewable bioenergy. As with other biofuels, there can be both positive and negative environmental effects. Most of these effects pertain to the way in which biomass is collected. Biogas upgrading contributes emissions intensity of the final product based on the energy efficiency of the upgrading process and through control of methane and carbon dioxide emissions.

=== Fugitive methane emissions ===
Biogenic methane is a greenhouse gas with a global warming potential of 27. Methane can be lost to the atmosphere in the biogas upgrading process. Most of the methane emissions come from incomplete separation, which results in a small amount of methane being contained in the exhaust gases from the process. Methane can also be lost through poor fittings and leaks in the process.

The main way to control fugitive emissions is through destruction of methane in exhaust gases. This is typically achieved by combusting methane in a thermal oxidizer. Methane emissions can also be avoided by reprocessing exhaust gas, biological methane oxidation or catalytic reactors.

=== Carbon capture ===
As a byproduct of biogas upgrading process, an exhaust stream that is rich in carbon dioxide is created. This stream of carbon dioxide can be captured. Captured carbon dioxide can then be used in other industries or sequestered. This is a form of bioenergy with carbon capture and storage and is considered to be carbon negative.

== See also ==
- Anaerobic digestion
- Renewable natural gas
- Bioenergy
