= MT-Energie =

MT-Energie GmbH
- Founded: 1995
- Founder: Christoph Martens
- Headquarters: Zeven, Germany
- Area served: Europe
- Key people: Markus Niedermayer (CEO); Dr. Karsten Wünsche (COO); Sören Schleider (CFO)
- Products: Biogas powerplants
- Net income: -23.3 million
- Number of employees: 500 (2013)
- Website: mt-energie.com

MT-Energie GmbH is a biogas technology company operating in the field of renewable energies. The company's headquarters are in Zeven (Germany) The UK branch office is located in Bridgnorth, Shropshire. MT-Energie develops and distributes both turnkey biogas powerplants and special bioprocess engineering components. Furthermore, it offers technical and biological services for biogas plants. The company's subsidiary MT-Biomethan GmbH, which was founded as part of the MT Group in 2008, offers technologies for biogas upgrading based on the process of pressureless amine scrubbing and a membrane-based gas permeation.

== History ==
The company was founded by Christoph Martens in 1995 and initially operated as engineering consultants. The early years of the company's activities focused on the development of special biogas components. In 1997, Martens invented the so-called air-supported membrane cover for biogas plants. This technology is now used by various manufacturers of biogas plants. With the foundation of MT-Energie GmbH & Co. KG in 2001, the company increasingly focused on the construction of turnkey biogas plants. By the end of 2013, about 600 biogas projects with a total installed power of 350 MW had been completed. In 2007 the company opened its first site abroad in Italy. Today MT-Energie operates throughout Europe and distributes its products and services in many countries worldwide. MT-Energie was founded in the German town of Rockstedt in the district of Rotenburg (Wümme). In November 2008 the company moved its premises to the small town of Zeven in Lower Saxony. There, on the premises of 62,300 square metres (671,000 sq ft), the new headquarters including offices, logistics area and manufacturing buildings for gas processing plants were constructed.

When MT-Energie released preliminary results for the 2012 financial year on 25 April 2013, they talked of a collapse of demand in the German market and the high costs of internationalisation, especially in Italy and the United States. MT-Energie has reduced the number of full-time employees in Italy from 40 to 15 and has pulled out of the US market. A company press release from earlier in the month (April 2, 2013) denied rumours of liquidity problems and imminent insolvency.

The 2013 preliminary financial results were released on 30 June 2014 and they stated an expected loss of 23.3 million euros for the entire company. This loss is more than 25% of the expected company turnover of 87.7 million euros in the same period.

MT-Energie has closed down the Australian, Canadian and US offices and pulled out of the North American and Australian markets completely. The company's only future involvement in North America will be completion of the already-begun projects in the USA. Due to the financial situation, all of the experienced country sales and project management directors were sacked or left the company, which leaves MT-Energie's foreign sales departments with inexperienced managers.

MT-Energie also had a covenant breach on their 2012-issued company bond (Anleihe) due to owner's equity also falling to 4.1%. In order to avoid defaulting on their bonds, a deal was made with the bond holders.

This low level of owner's equity also means that the banks offering credit can cancel their credit agreements with MT-Energie. The banks and MT-Energie are now negotiating to find a solution.

== Corporate social responsibility ==
In winter 2010/11, MT-Energie offered the national archery team of the German Disabled Sports Association its Zeven storage and logistics centre for their preparations for the summer season. The team members included double Olympic medallist Mario Oehme as well as the incumbent runner-up world champions Michael Arenz and Michael Müller of the “compound team”.
