= Integrated manure utilization system =

IMUS Sustainable Technology

IMUS (also known as integrated manure utilization system) is an anaerobic digestion technology that converts organic material into biogas that is used to produce electricity, heat and nutrients. The technology uses waste such as municipal waste, cow manure, sand laden feed lot waste, and food processing waste. The technology can be integrated with other industrial process, such as municipal facilities, open pen feedlots, food processing, and ethanol plants. The technology was developed in 1999 by Himark BioGas.
