= SNV Netherlands Development Organisation =

Dutch global development organisation

SNV
- Founded: 1965
- Purpose: Agri-food, energy, and water
- Headquarters: The Hague, The Netherlands
- Region served: Over 20 countries in Africa and Asia
- Employees: Over 1,600
- Website: snv.org

SNV is a mission-driven global development partner, established in the Netherlands in 1965.

Inspired by the principles and objectives set out Sustainable Development Goals, SNV is committed to building resilient agri-food systems that deliver food security; to increasing the reliability and availability of water and sanitation; and to improving access to affordable and sustainable energy.

The organisation currently works in more than 20 countries in Africa and Asia.

== History ==
SNV was established as the Stichting Nederlandse Vrijwilligers ("Foundation of Netherlands Volunteers") in 1965, under the Dutch Ministry of Foreign Affairs.

Originally focused on posting young Dutch volunteers to low-middle income countries, SNV stopped working with volunteers in 1988 in response to the changing needs of host organisations and countries. SNV has since evolved to become one of the largest Dutch development organisations.

In 1993 the organisation changed its name to SNV Netherlands Development Organisation and in 2002 formally separated from the Ministry of Foreign Affairs.

In 2023, SNV realised €163.3M in revenue.

== Activities ==
SNV works on three themes: gender equality and social inclusion, climate adaptation and mitigation, and strong institutions and effective governance. This is done across three sectors: agri-food, energy, and water.

== Organisation ==
SNV's Global Office is located in The Hague, the Netherlands, with country offices in Africa and Asia.

SNV currently operates programmes in the following countries:

Bangladesh, Benin, Bhutan, Burkina Faso, Burundi, Cambodia, Ethiopia, Ghana, Indonesia, Kenya, Lao PDR, Mali, Mozambique, Nepal, Niger, Nigeria, Rwanda, South Sudan, Tanzania, Uganda, Vietnam, Zambia, Zimbabwe.

As of 2024, the organisation employs more than 1,600 people worldwide.
