= Municipal solid waste =

Type of waste consisting of everyday items discarded by the public

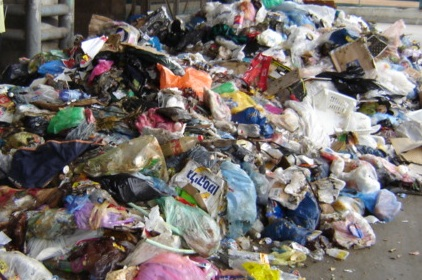
Mixed municipal waste in Hiriya, Tel Aviv

Municipal solid waste (MSW), commonly known as trash or garbage in the United States and rubbish in Britain, is a waste type consisting of everyday items that are discarded by the public. "Garbage" can also refer specifically to food waste, as in a garbage disposal; the two are sometimes collected separately. In the European Union, the semantic definition is 'mixed municipal waste,' given waste code 20 03 01 in the European Waste Catalog. Although the waste may originate from a number of sources that has nothing to do with a municipality, the traditional role of municipalities in collecting and managing these kinds of waste have produced the particular etymology 'municipal.'

== Composition ==
The composition of municipal solid waste varies greatly from municipality to municipality, and it changes significantly with time. In municipalities which have a well-developed waste recycling system, the waste stream mainly consists of intractable wastes such as plastic film and non-recyclable packaging materials. At the start of the 20th century, the majority of domestic waste (53%) in the UK consisted of coal ash from open fires. In developed areas without significant recycling activity it predominantly includes food wastes, market wastes, yard wastes, plastic containers, and product packaging materials, and other miscellaneous solid wastes from residential, commercial, institutional, and industrial sources. Most definitions of municipal solid waste do not include industrial wastes, agricultural wastes, medical waste, radioactive waste or sewage sludge. Waste collection is performed by the municipality within a given area. The term "residual waste" relates to waste left from household sources containing materials that have not been separated out or sent for processing. Waste can be classified in several ways, but the following list represents a typical classification:

- Biodegradable waste: food and kitchen waste, green waste, paper (most can be recycled, although some difficult to compost plant material may be excluded)
- Recyclable materials: paper, cardboard, glass, bottles, jars, tin cans, aluminum cans, aluminium foil, metals, certain plastics, textiles, clothing, tires, batteries, etc.
- Inert waste: construction and demolition waste, dirt, rocks, debris
- Electrical and electronic waste (WEEE) – ⁣electrical appliances, light bulbs, washing machines, TVs, computers, screens, mobile phones, alarm clocks, watches, etc.
- Composite wastes: waste clothing, Tetra Pack food and drink cartons, waste plastics such as toys and plastic garden furniture
- Hazardous waste including most paints, chemicals, tires, batteries, light bulbs, electrical appliances, fluorescent lamps, aerosol spray cans, and fertilizers
- Toxic waste including pesticides, herbicides, and fungicides
- Biomedical waste, expired pharmaceutical drugs, etc.

For example, typical municipal solid waste in China is composed of 55.9% food residue, 8.5% paper, 11.2% plastics, 3.2% textiles, 2.9% wood waste, 0.8% rubber, and 18.4% non-combustibles.

== Components of solid waste management ==
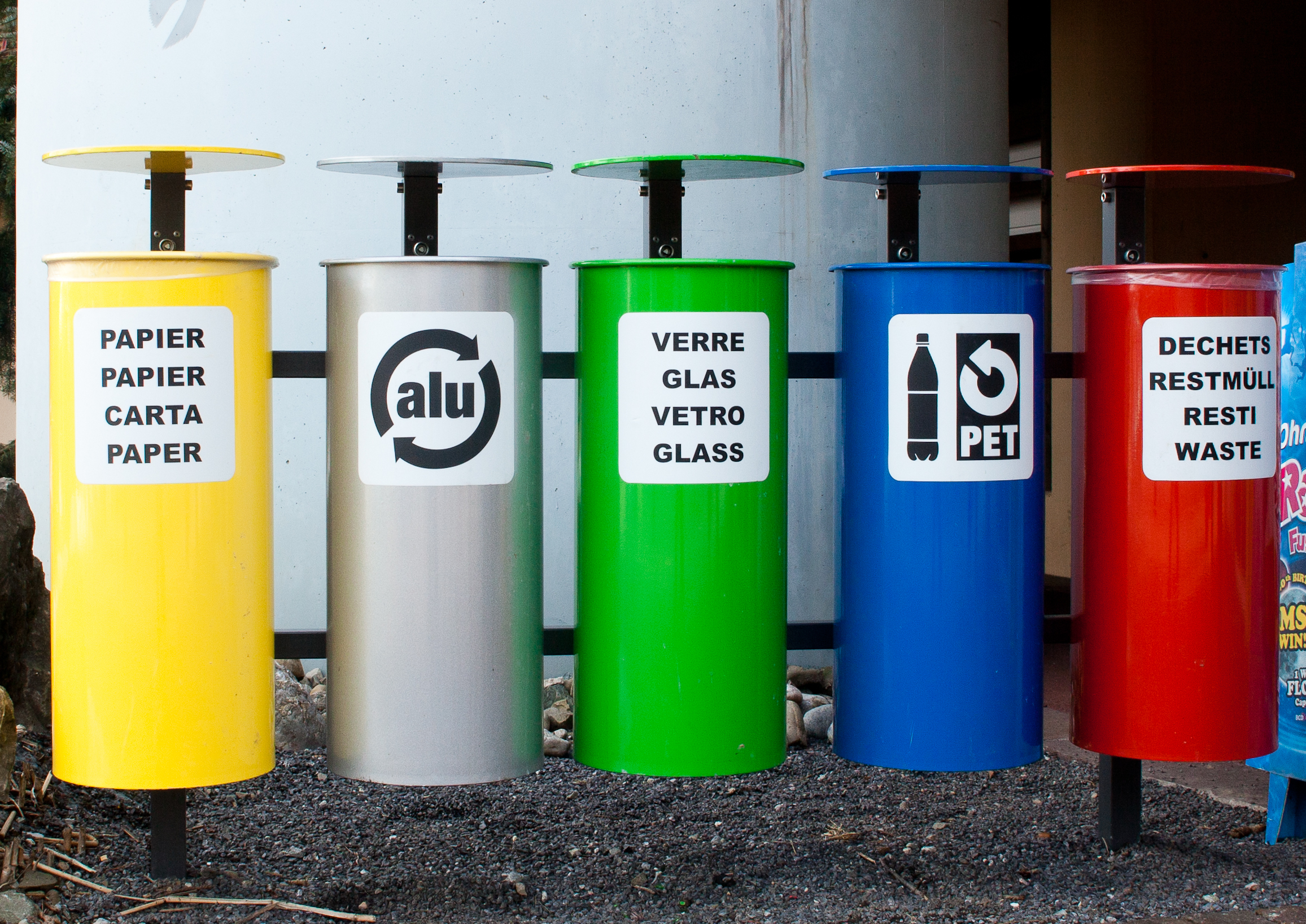
Bins to collect paper, aluminium, glass, PET bottles and incinerable waste

The municipal solid waste industry has four components: recycling, composting, disposal, and waste-to-energy via incineration. There is no single approach that can be applied to the management of all waste streams, therefore governmental bodies such as the United States Environmental Protection Agency and the European Union have developed hierarchy ranking strategies for municipal solid waste. Waste hierarchies consist of four levels ordered from most preferred to least preferred methods based on their environmental soundness: Source reduction and reuse; recycling or composting; energy recovery; treatment and disposal. The European Union's waste hierarchy is described in the Waste Framework Directive.

=== Collection ===
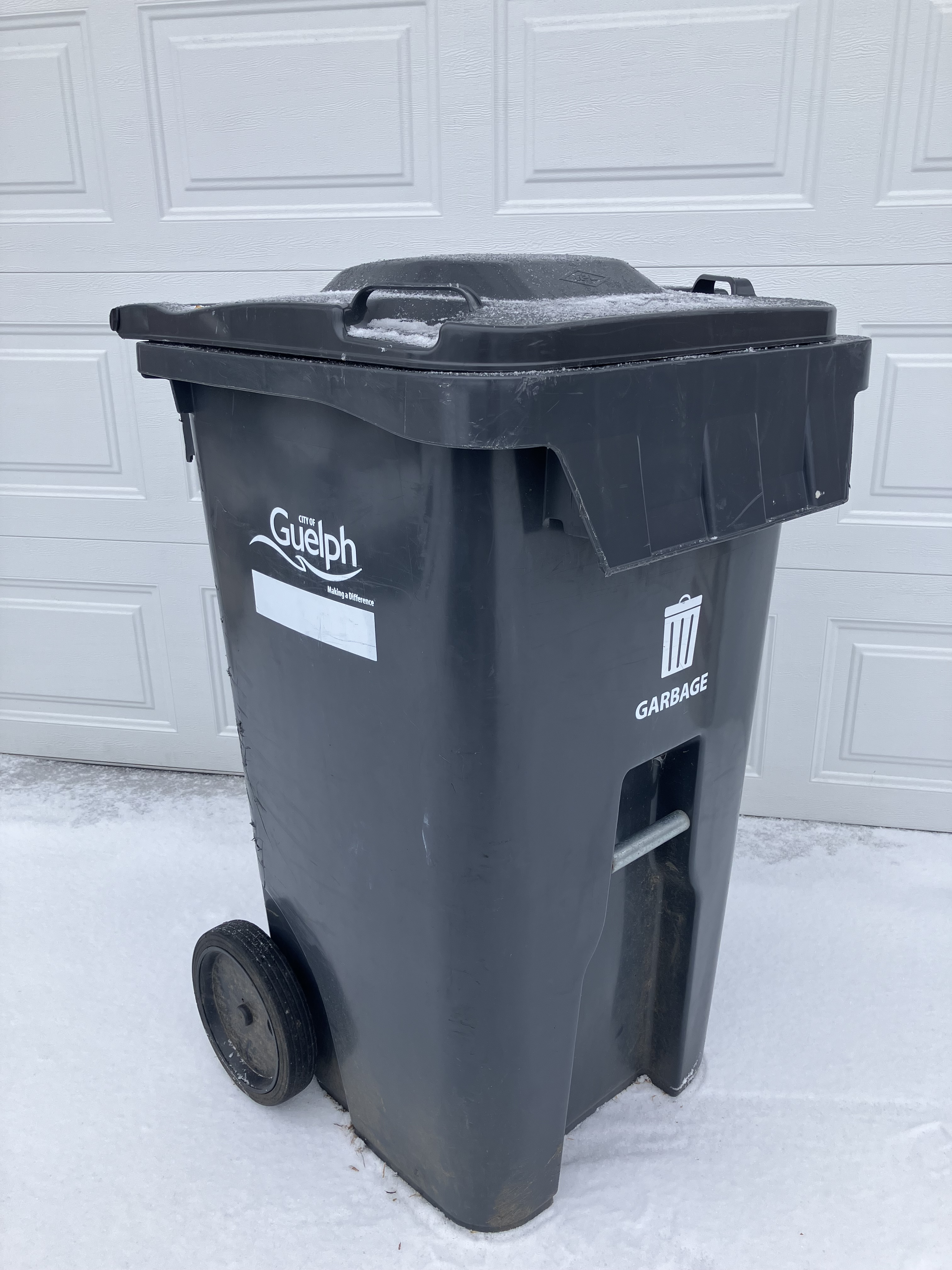
A municipal waste bin with wheels in Guelph used to collect residential solid waste.

The functional element of collection includes not only the gathering of solid waste and recyclable materials, but also the transport of these materials, after collection, to the location where the collection vehicle is emptied. This location may be a materials processing facility, a transfer station or a landfill disposal site.

Some common ways to collect garbage are curb-side collection, door-to-door collection, community collection points, drop-off recyclable centers, and special collection programs for bulky and hazardous waste.

=== Waste handling and separation, storage and processing at the source ===
Waste handling and separation involves activities associated with waste management until the waste is placed in storage containers for collection. Handling also encompasses the movement of loaded containers to the point of collection. Separating different types of waste components is an important step in the handling and storage of solid waste at the source of collection.

Source segregation will help to enhance recycling, prevent contamination, allow composting, and ensure that hazardous waste is properly treated. Segregation types are biodegradable, recyclable, residual, and special or hazardous waste.

=== Segregation and processing and transformation of solid wastes ===
The types of means and facilities that are now used for the recovery of waste materials that have been separated at the source include kerbside collection, drop-off, and buy-back centres. The separation and processing of wastes that have been separated at the source and the separation of commingled wastes usually occur at a materials recovery facility, transfer stations, combustion facilities, and treatment plants.

MRFs use different techniques like manual sorting, mechanical screening, magnetization, eddy current separation, optical sorting, shredding, and compacting to separate and process recyclable waste.

=== Transfer and transport ===
This element involves two main steps. First, the waste is transferred from a smaller collection vehicle to larger transport equipment. The waste is then transported, usually over long distances, to a processing or disposal site.

Transfer stations provide a solution for consolidating wastes collected in more than one vehicle. This will make transportation easier and possibly reduce the amount of fuel used.

=== Disposal ===
Today, the disposal of wastes by land filling or land spreading is the ultimate fate of all solid wastes, whether they are residential wastes collected and transported directly to a landfill site, residual materials from materials recovery facilities (MRFs), residue from the combustion of solid waste, compost, or other substances from various solid waste processing facilities. A modern sanitary landfill is not a dump; it is an engineered facility used for disposing of solid wastes on land without creating nuisances or hazards to public health or safety, such as the problems of insects and the contamination of groundwater. Modern sanitary landfills usually have protective liners, leachate collection systems, groundwater monitoring wells, landfill gas collection systems, waste compaction, daily covers, and final cover systems. Such practices aid in decreasing contamination of the environment and surrounding populations.

=== Reusing ===
In recent years, environmental organizations, such as Freegle or The Freecycle Network, have been gaining popularity for their online reuse networks. These networks provide a worldwide online registry of unwanted items that would otherwise be thrown away, for individuals and nonprofits to reuse or recycle. Therefore, this free Internet-based service reduces landfill pollution and promotes the gift economy. Other forms of reuse include fixing household equipment, gifting clothes, refurbishing furniture, lending tools, and carrying reusable bags and boxes for shopping. Reuse prolongs the life cycle of the products and decreases the need for fresh material resources.

=== Landfills ===
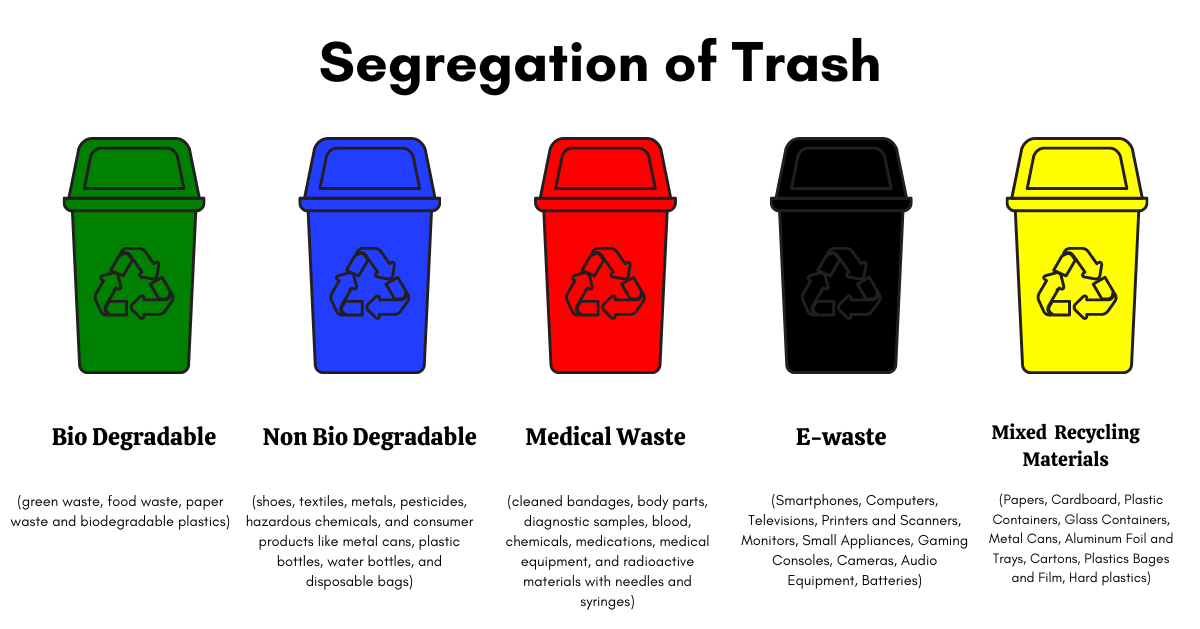
Segregation of trash

Landfills are created by land dumping. Land dumping methods vary, most commonly it involves the mass dumping of waste into a designated area, usually a hole or sidehill. After the waste is dumped, it is then compacted by large machines. When the dumping cell is full, it is then "sealed" with a plastic sheet and covered in several feet of dirt. This is the primary method of dumping in the United States because of the low cost and abundance of unused land in North America. Landfills are regulated in the US by the Environmental Protection Agency, which enforces standards provided in the Resource Conservation Recovery Act, such as requiring liners and groundwater monitoring. This is because landfills pose the threat of pollution and can contaminate groundwater. The signs of pollution are effectively masked by disposal companies, and it is often hard to see any evidence. Usually, landfills are surrounded by large walls or fences hiding the mounds of debris. Large amounts of chemical odor eliminating agent are sprayed in the air surrounding landfills to hide the evidence of the rotting waste inside the plant.

=== Energy generation ===
Municipal solid waste produces enormous amounts of methane, a potent greenhouse gas. However, nearly 90% of these methane emissions could be avoided with existing technologies.

In particular, municipal solid waste can be used to generate energy because of the lipid content present within it. A lot of MSW products can be converted into clean energy if the lipid content can be accessed and utilized. Several technologies have been developed that make the processing of MSW for energy generation cleaner and more economical than ever before, including landfill gas capture, combustion, pyrolysis, gasification, and plasma arc gasification.

While older waste incineration plants emitted a lot of pollutants, recent regulatory changes and new technologies have significantly reduced this concern. United States Environmental Protection Agency (EPA) regulations in 1995 and 2000 under the Clean Air Act have succeeded in reducing emissions of dioxins from waste-to-energy facilities by more than 99 percent below 1990 levels, while mercury emissions have been reduced by over 90 percent. The EPA noted these improvements in 2003, citing waste-to-energy as a power source "with less environmental impact than almost any other source of electricity".

== See also ==
- Category:Waste by country
- Garbology (study of modern refuse and trash)
- List of waste management acronyms
- MSW/LFG (municipal solid waste and landfill gas)
- Methanol fuel#History and production
- Sewage
- Waste management
- Waste minimisation
- Global waste trade
