= Fort Pond Bay =

Bay off Long Island Sound at Montauk, New York

Coordinates: 41°03′03″N 71°58′10″W

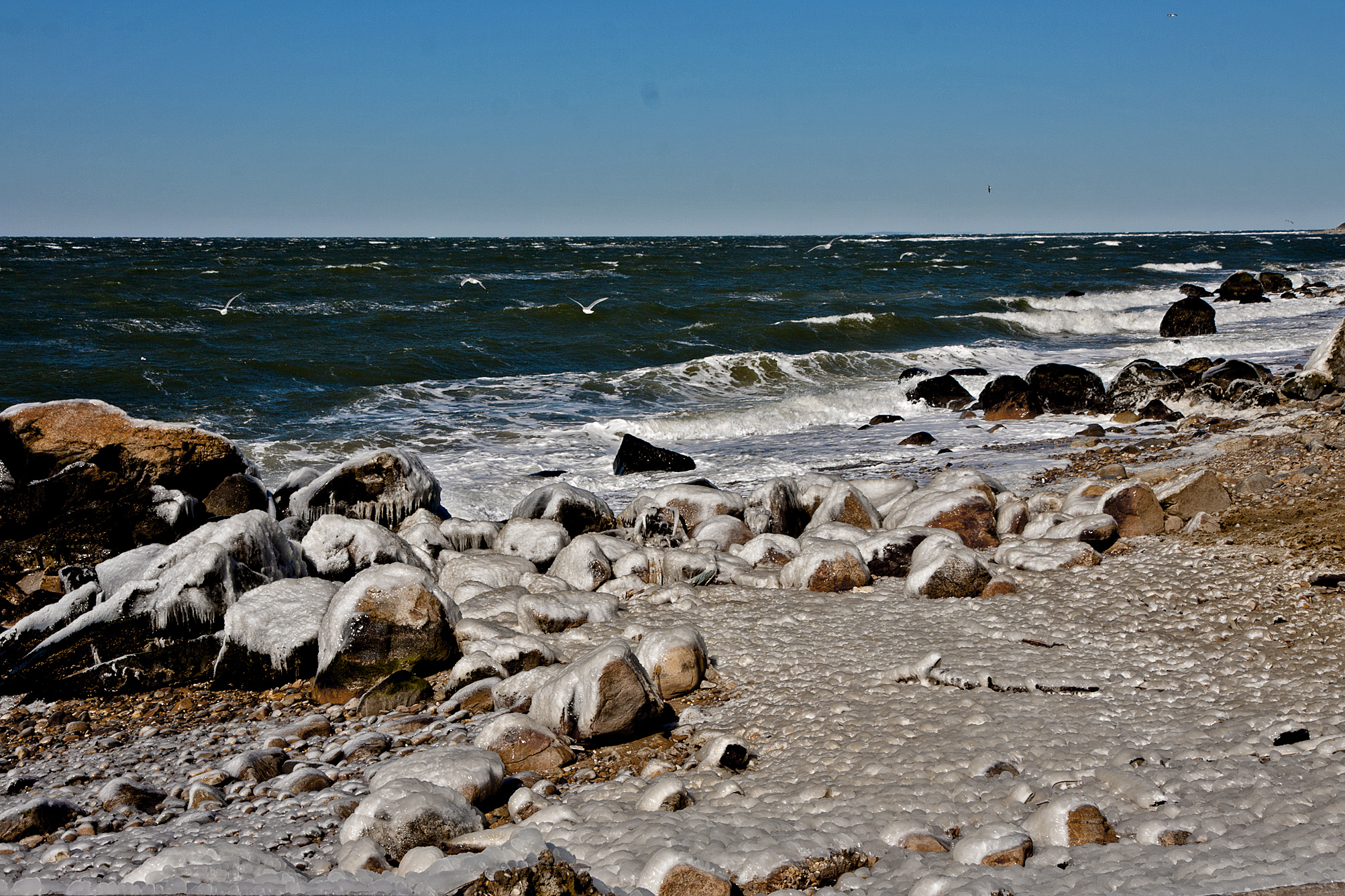
Fort Pond Bay

Fort Pond Bay is a bay off Long Island Sound at Montauk, New York that was site of the first port on the end of Long Island. The bay has a long naval and civilian history.

== History ==
=== New-York Province and the American Revolution ===
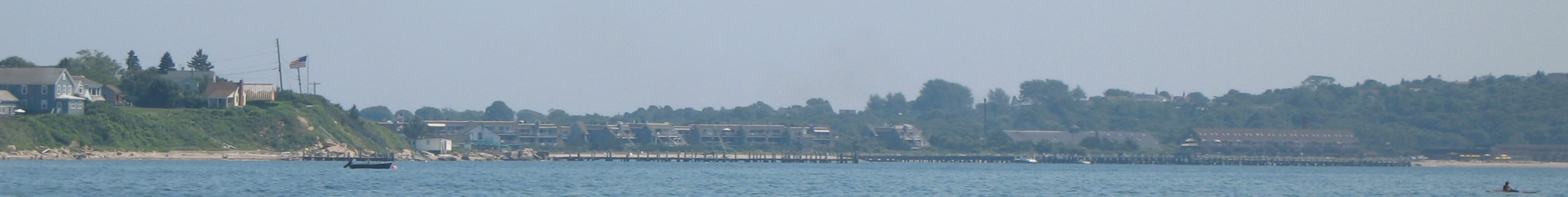
Fort Pond Bay showing the original area where Montauk was formed and where Long Island Rail Road tracks run. Colonial troops feigned greater numbers on the hill about midway on the right to scare off the British in 1775.

Fort Pond Bay was first listed by name in a 1655 map published in 1680 by John Scott which makes note of a Montaukett Native-American fort on its banks.

Early settlers in the area raised cattle and sheep on the bluffs above the bay. During the American Revolutionary War during the Siege of Boston British warships sailed into the bay in 1775. Local militia under Captain John Dayton, feigned they had more men than they had, turning their coats inside out as they marched back and forth on top of a high hill to the south. The tactic is called Dayton's Ruse.

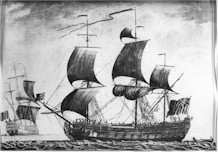
HMS Culloden

Long Island was occupied throughout the war and the bay was used by the British for their blockade of Connecticut. In 1781 HMS Culloden ran aground while pursuing a French frigate during a January storm. The ship, which survived the initial ground hit a rock and had to be scuttled in the bay at Culloden Point and burned with its canons thrown overboard. Its debris field and wreck site is now the only underwater park on Long Island.

In the late 18th century, the small fishing village of Montauk was established at the southeast corner of the bay.

=== The 19th century and today ===
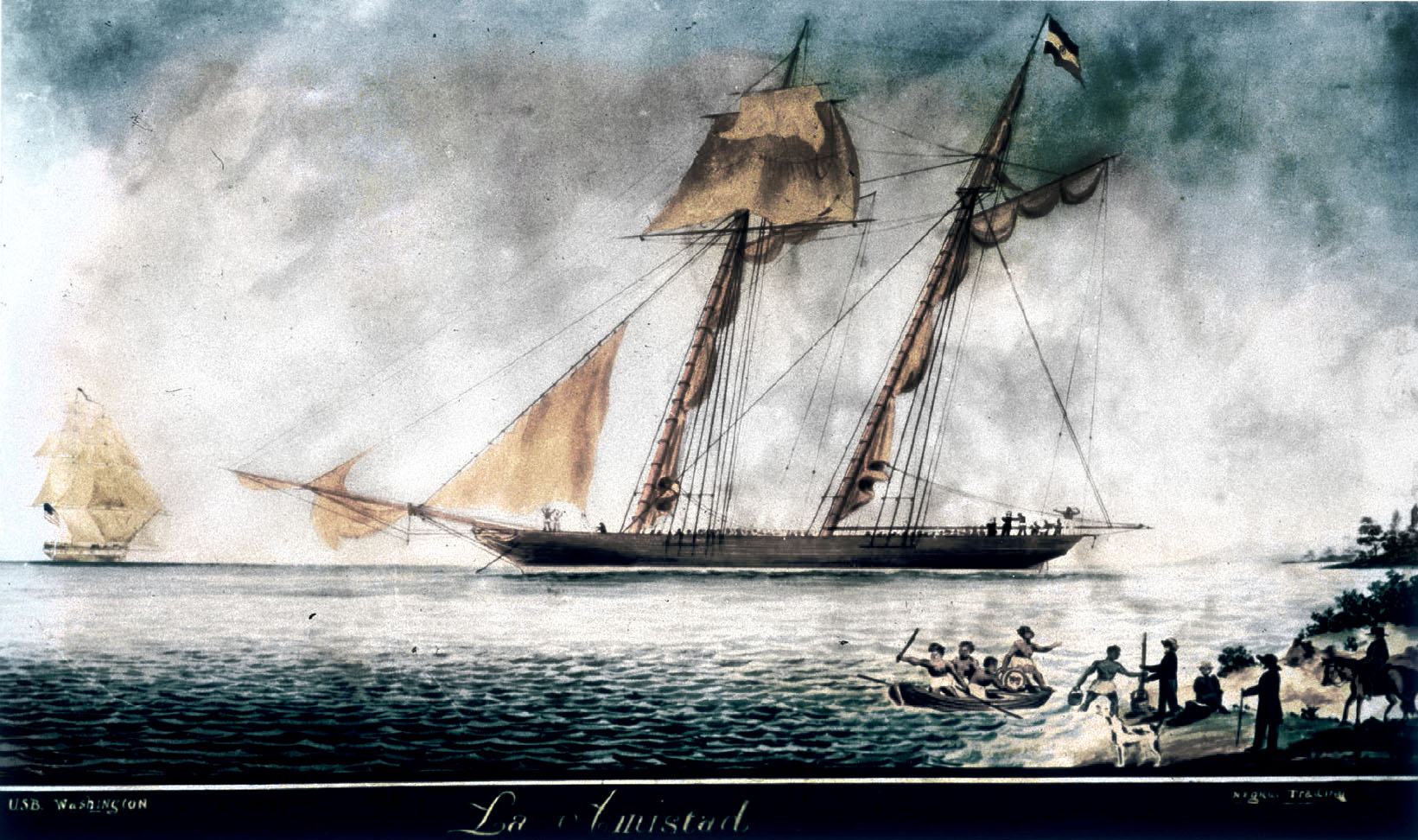
USS Washington and La Amistad at Culloden Point

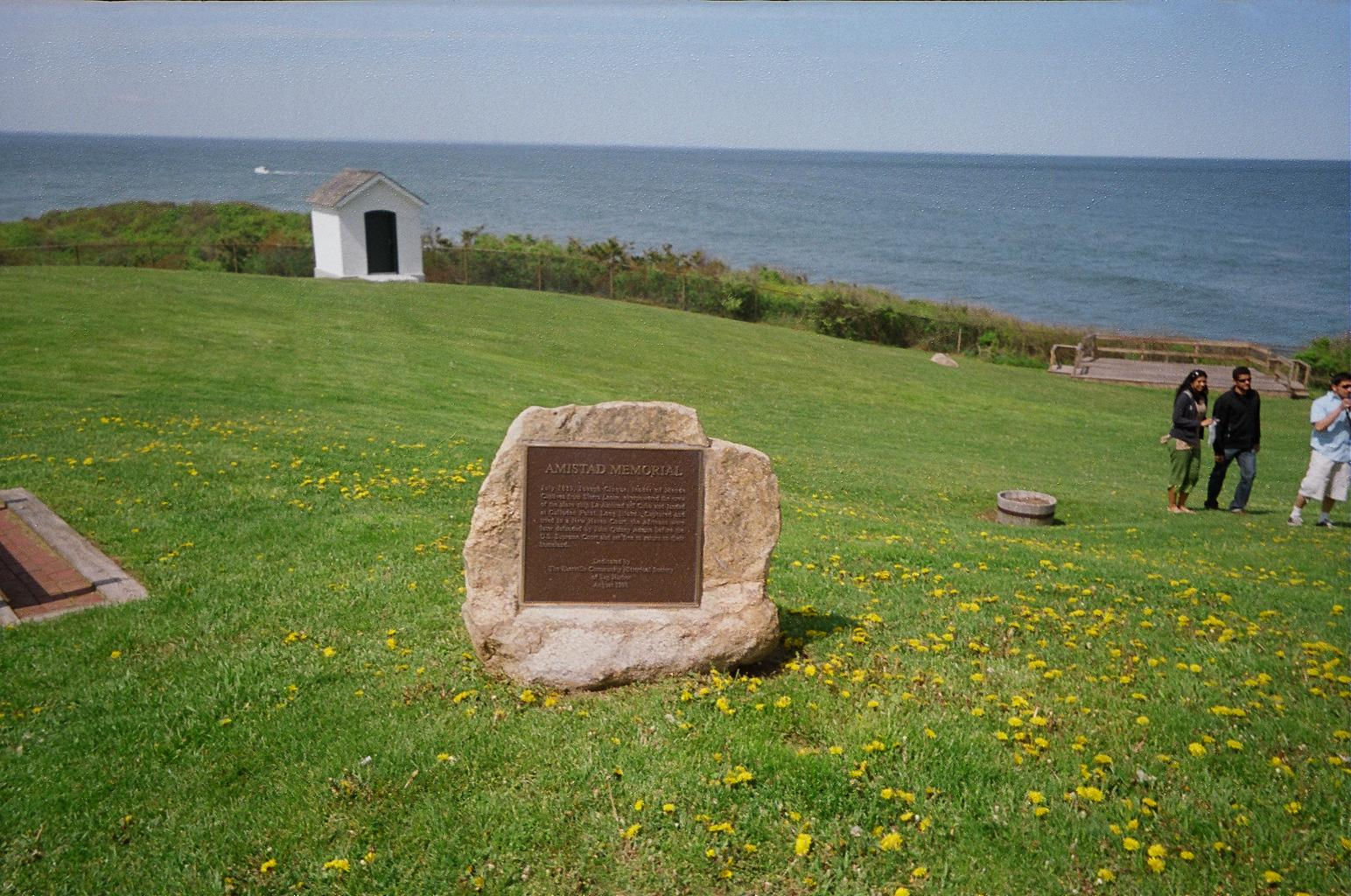
Amistad memorial at Montauk Point State Park on Long Island.

In 1839 the slave ship Amistad anchored in the bay (also at Culloden Point) when the surviving crew tried to convince their revolted slave captors that they had returned to Africa as they went for provisions in the village of Montauk. The ship was seized by the USS Washington in the bay.

In the 1890s, Austin Corbin extended the Long Island Rail Road from Bridgehampton, New York to the Montauk fishing village (the line extension was called the Fort Pond Railway). His friend Arthur Bensen purchased 10,000 acres (40 km^{2}) of Montaukett land around the village and the LIRR began advertising that it could cut a day off ship travel by docking in Montauk and taking the train rather than going to New York. Corbin built a steel pier into pond for the overseas ships (even as the Corps of Engineers continued to caution against using the bay because of rocks.

The dream was never to materialize and the U.S. Army bought the land for Camp Wikoff. Theodore Roosevelt and his Rough Riders were to come by transport into the bay following the Spanish–American War at the camp to be quarantined over concerns about yellow fever.

The fishing village was obliterated in the storm of the Great Hurricane of 1938. The Navy took over the area for a seaplane and dirigible base during World War II (the dock is still in use). The Montauk fishing village was moved a mile south closer to the Atlantic Ocean.

During the years after World War II, the bay ceased to be used by most boats because of flooding and rocks. Boats now dock in the dredged Lake Montauk. In the 1960s the bluffs above the bay were used to build Leisurama homes as inexpensive second homes that had been inspired by the Kitchen Debate between Richard Nixon and Nikita Khrushchev.
