= Leisurama house =

Type of prefabricated house

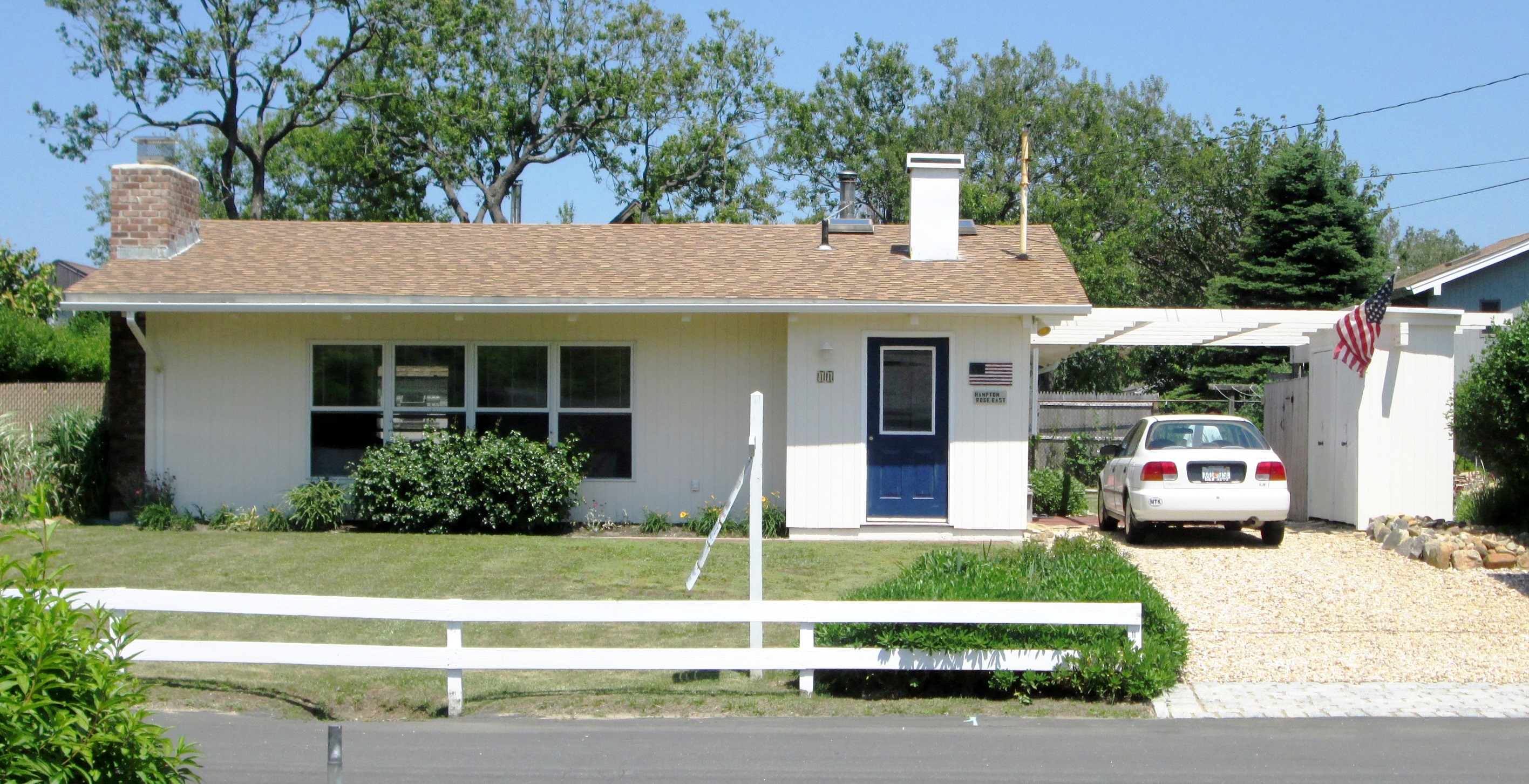
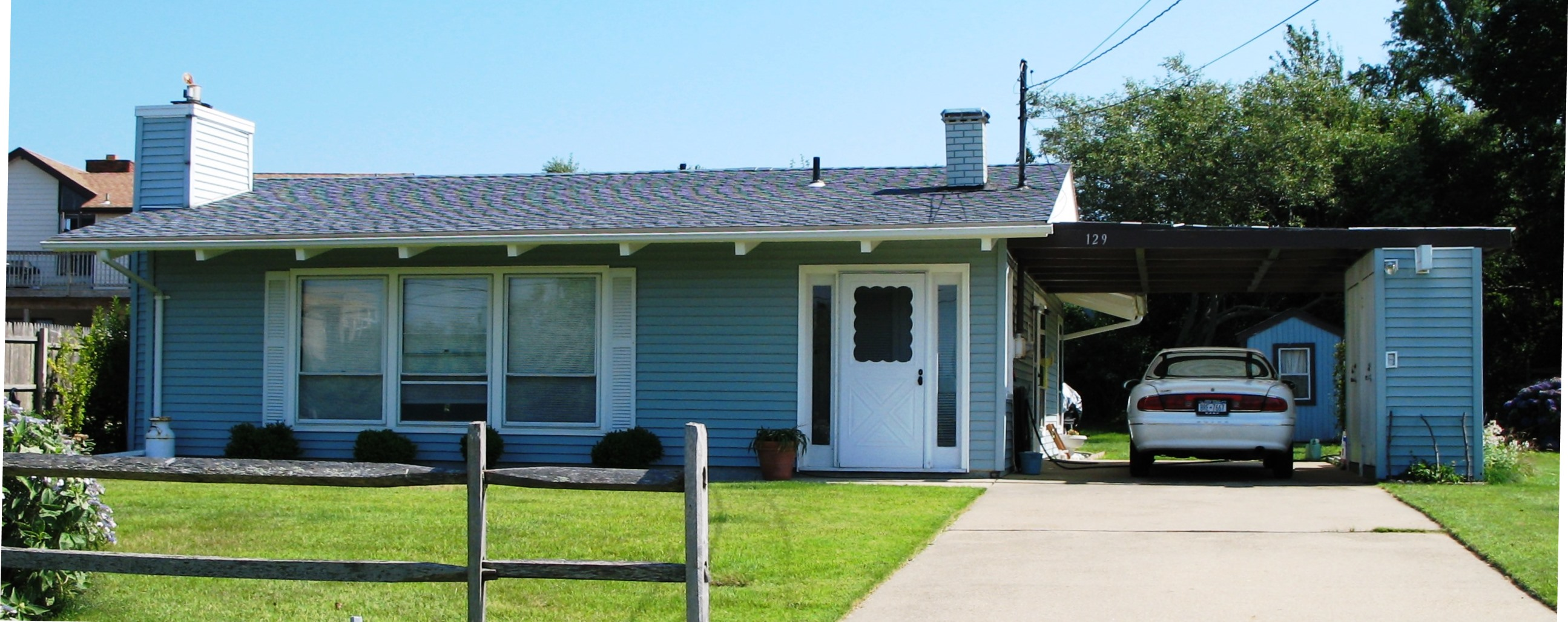
Two of the more than 200 Leisurama homes at Culloden Point, in Montauk, New York

Leisurama was a line of inexpensive prefabricated houses which were available for purchase through Macy's department stores in the United States in the mid-1960s. The precursor to the final design was shown at the 1959 American National Exhibition in Moscow, which provoked the noted Kitchen Debate between Vice President Richard Nixon and Soviet Premier Nikita Khrushchev.

Over 200 Leisurama houses are part of the Culloden Point vacation home development in Montauk, New York, which was constructed between 1963 and 1965 and was subject of a 2005 documentary, titled Leisurama, broadcast by PBS. Some of the Leisurama homes were exhibited at the 1964 New York World's Fair. Lauderhill, Florida, is another location which features numerous Leisurama houses.

== History ==
In 1959, Andrew Geller, vice president of the Housing and Home Components department at Loewy/Snaith (founded by famed industrial designer Raymond Loewy), supervised the design of the "Typical American House," built at the American National Exhibition in Moscow in 1959. The exhibition home largely replicated a home previously built at 398 Townline Road in Commack, New York, which had been originally designed by Stanley H. Klein for a Long Island-based firm, All-State Properties – later known as Sadkin Enterprises – headed by developer Herbert Sadkin. To accommodate visitors to the exhibition, Sadkin hired Loewy's office to modify Klein's floor plan. Geller supervised the work, which "split" the house, creating a way for large numbers of visitors to tour the small house and giving rise to its nickname, Splitnik, a pun on the Soviet satellite Sputnik.

During the exhibition, on July 24, 1959, Vice President Richard Nixon and Soviet Premier Nikita Khrushchev engaged in what became known as the Kitchen Debate — an informal debate over the relative merits of capitalism and Communism, with Khrushchev avowing Americans could not afford the luxury represented by the "Typical American House". Tass, the Soviet news agency said: "There is no more truth in showing this as the typical home of the American worker than, say, in showing the Taj Mahal as the typical home of a Bombay textile worker."

=== Macy's ===
The temporary "Typical American House" exhibit was demolished, and the developer hired William Safire as the company's marketing agent. All-State later hired Geller to design the homes, marketed at Macy's and built on Long Island – leveraging the press coverage from the Russian exhibition.

Visitors to Macy's could view and purchase an entire home – down to and including a 45 piece, eight place setting of Melmac dishware – which was displayed on the ninth floor at the store's Herald Square flagship store . The houses were marketed aggressively, and Sadkin built approximately 200 of the homes in a development called "Culloden Point" in Montauk, New York in 1963 and 1964. All-State went on to develop Leisurama homes in an area near Fort Lauderdale, which grew into the city of Lauderhill.

In 2003, The New York Times described the Macy's homes:

The package deal included a 730–1,200-square-foot (68–111 m^{2}) house on a 75-by-100-foot (23 by 30 m) lot, as well as state-of-the art appliances, furniture, housewares and everything else a family would need for a weekend in the sun, including toothbrushes and toilet paper. The cost was roughly $13,000 to $17,000.

== See also ==
- Lustron house
- Dymaxion house
