= Culloden Point =

Peninsula in New York, United States

Coordinates: 41.07028°N 71.96°W

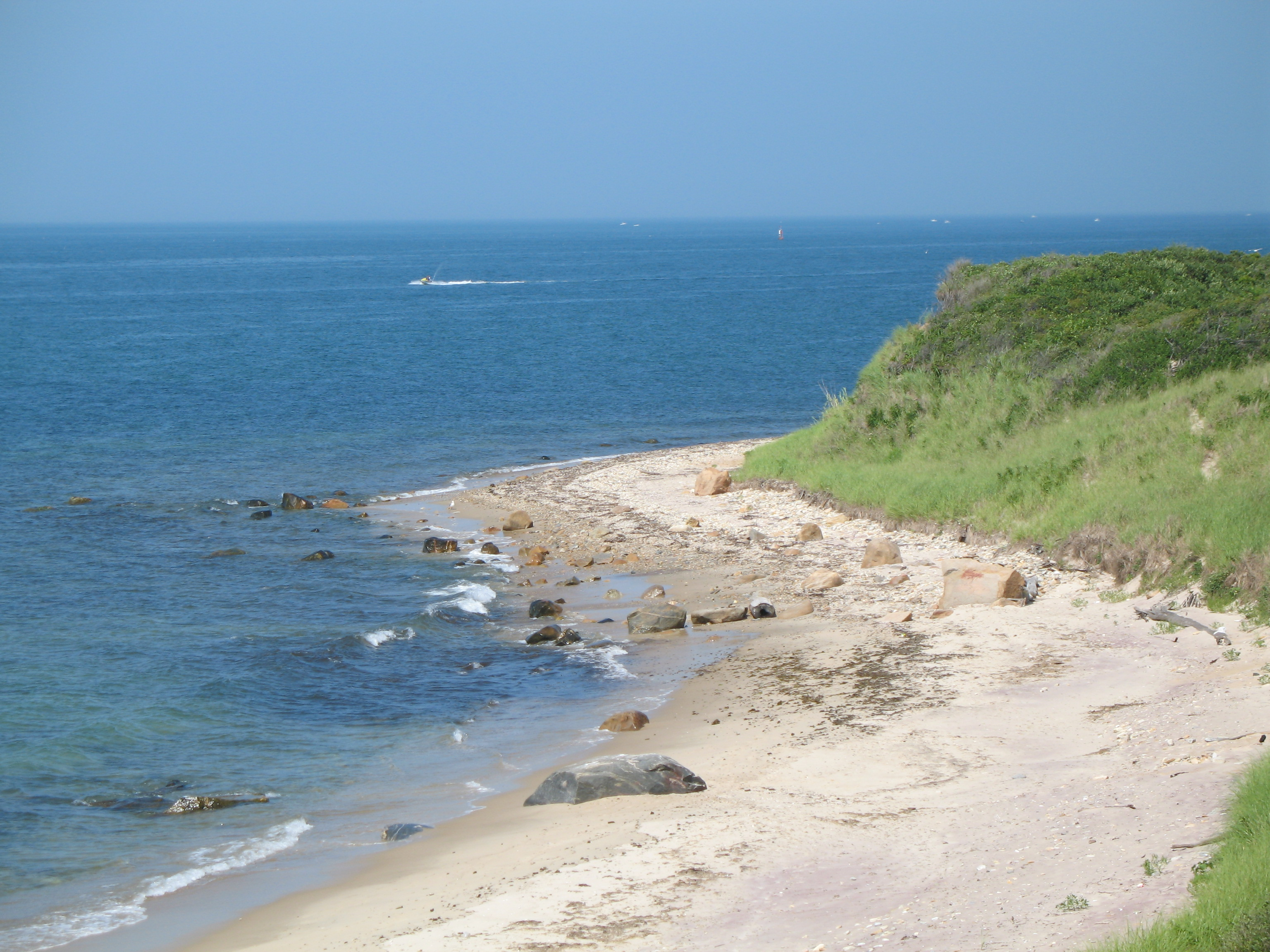
Photo from parking lot at the top of the bluff in July 2006. The large rock with red on its side is the landmark for scuba divers, who follow a heading of 333 degrees from it to reach the wreck of HMS Culloden

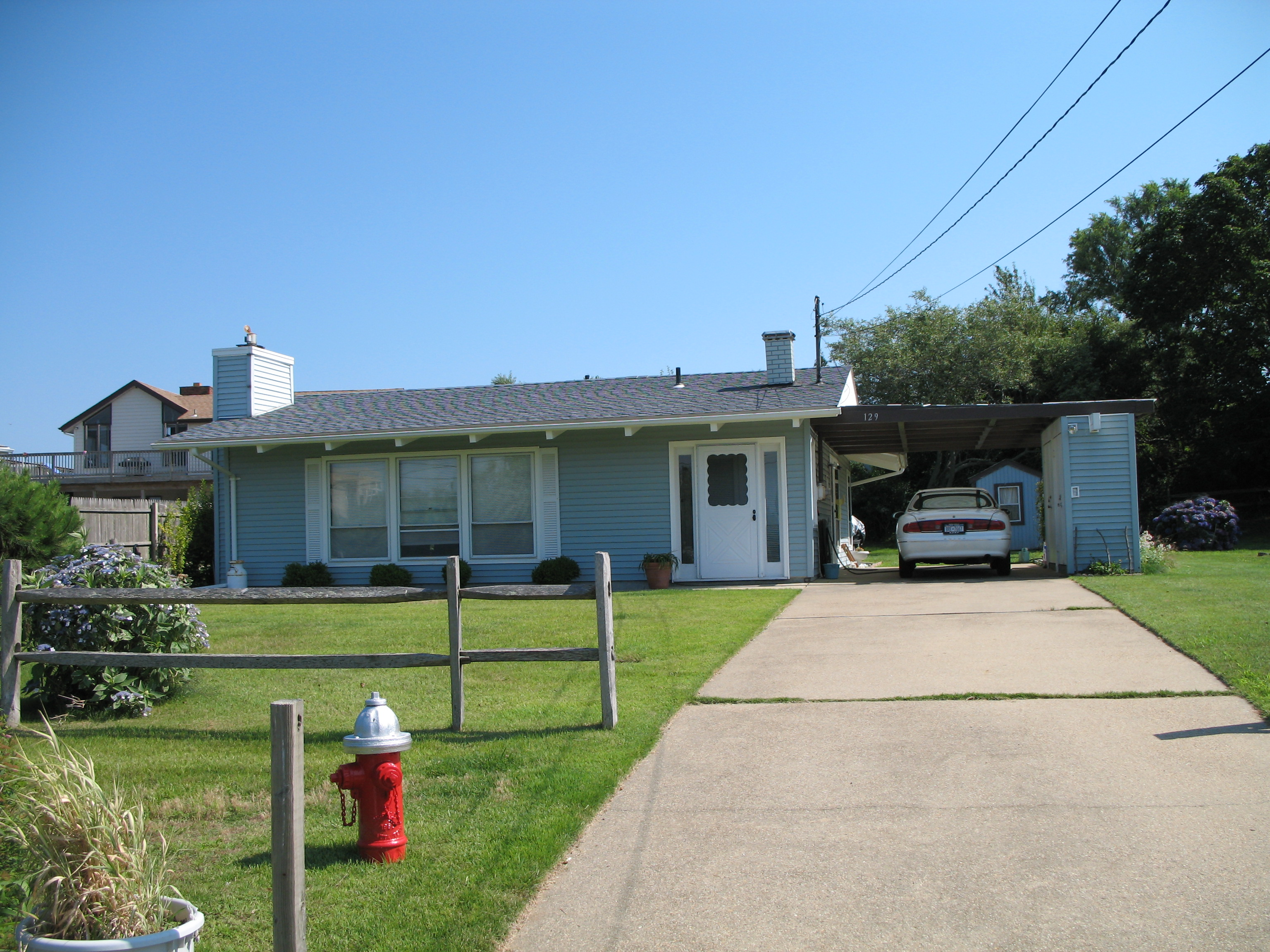
One of the more than 200 Leisurama second homes at Culloden Point. (July 2006)

Culloden Point is a small peninsula north of Montauk, New York, that marks the east entrance to Fort Pond Bay from Gardiners Bay.

== HMS Culloden ==
During the American Revolutionary War, the British ship of the line HMS Culloden ran aground here early on January 24, 1781, while attempting to get from Block Island Sound out to the open Atlantic Ocean to escape a winter gale and snowstorm with two other British warships. As recounted in Long Island and the Sea by Bill Bleyer (The History Press, 2019), the ship of the line HMS Bedford, leading the trio, successfully turned around at midnight when her captain realized they had not cleared Montauk Point. But Captain George Balfour of Culloden continued on until 4 AM, when lookouts saw breakers ahead and tried unsuccessfully to turn the ship back into Block Island Sound. Efforts to refloat Culloden the next day were unsuccessful, so after recovering bronze cannons and other supplies and leaving old iron cannon behind, Balfour ordered the ship burned to the waterline to keep her out of Patriot hands.

The wreck was discovered in the 1970s when portions of it washed ashore (reports indicate that some of the washed-up debris had been used for beach campfires). One of the cannons is on display at the East Hampton Marine Museum in Amagansett, New York, which has an extensive display of Culloden artifacts.

Other cannon are still on the bottom close to shore and about 20 to 25 feet (6.1 to 7.6 m) below the surface. The wreck is protected on the National Register of Historic Places. The park is accessible on a single-lane gravel road at the west end of Soundview Drive. Divers use a large rock with pebbles on top of it to the north of the bluff stairs as the landmark for reaching the wreck. They follow a heading of 333 degrees. It is about 150 feet (46 m) off shore. The debris field is marked by buoys. Usually little of the wreck is visible, typically just rust stains in the sand, but some portions of the hull sometimes can be seen after storms.

Prior to the discovery of the wreck in the 1970s, the spit was called Will's Point, possibly named after Will Indian, a herder mentioned in early East Hampton Town records.

== Amistad ==
In 1839 Amistad anchored at Culloden Point after the surviving crew tried to convince their revolting slave captors that they had returned to Africa. They went for provisions in the village of Montauk. The ship was seized here by USS Washington.

== Leisurama ==
In the early 1960s, about 200 Leisurama prefabricated homes designed by Andrew Geller were built at the point after being sold from a display on the ninth floor of Macy's in New York City.
