= Prefabricated home =

Type of prefabricated building

Construction of a prefabricated modular home (see also time-lapse video)

Prefabricated homes, often referred to as prefab homes or simply prefabs, are specialist dwelling types of prefabricated building, which are manufactured off-site in advance, usually in standard sections that can be easily shipped and assembled. Some current prefab home designs include architectural details inspired by postmodernism or futurist architecture.

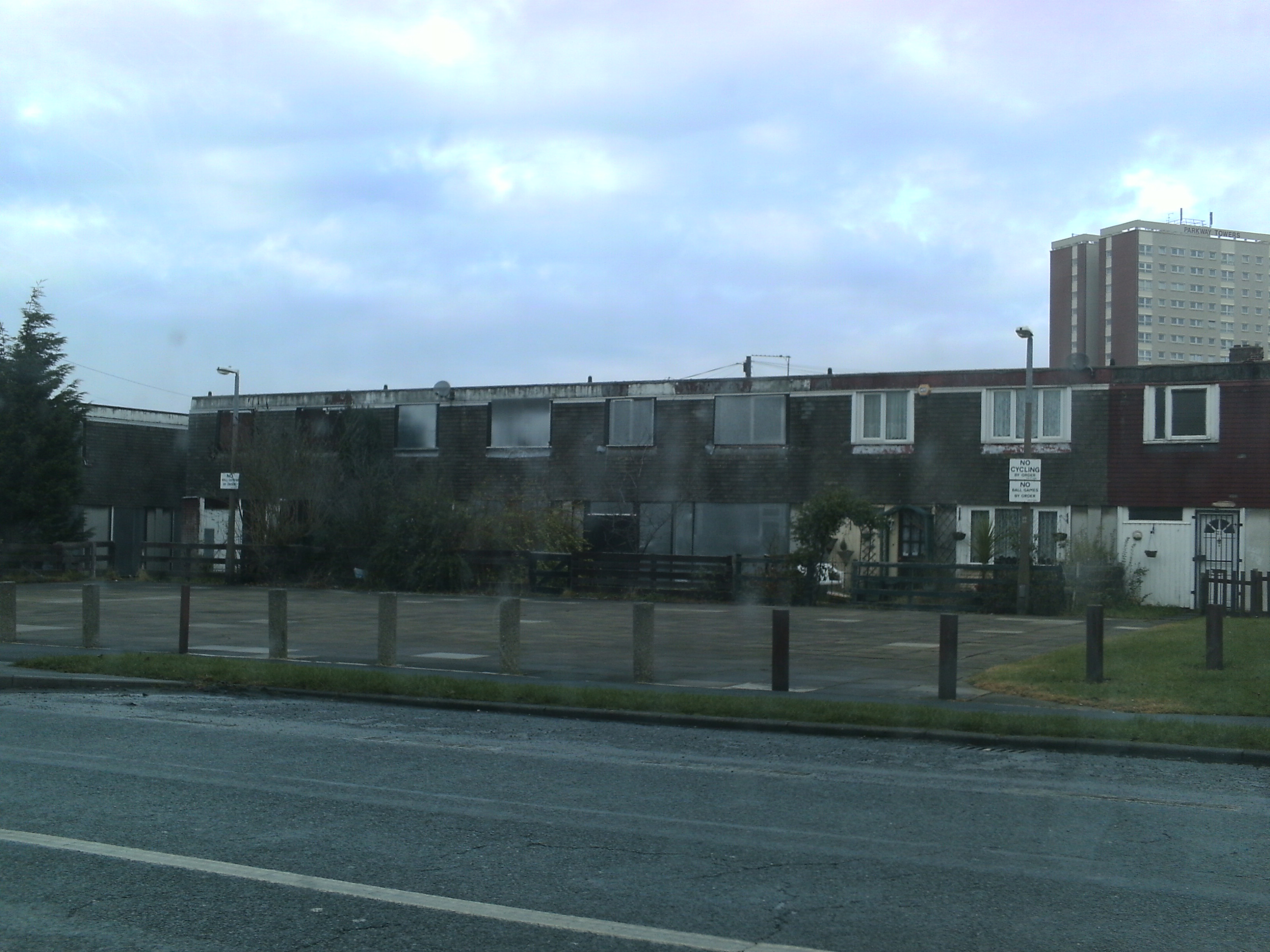
Uninhabited prefabricated council houses in Seacroft, Leeds, UK

"Prefabricated" may refer to buildings built in components (e.g. panels), modules (modular homes) or transportable sections (manufactured homes), and may also be used to refer to mobile homes, i.e., houses on wheels. Although similar, the methods and design of the three vary widely. There are two-level home plans, as well as custom home plans. There are considerable differences in the construction types. In the U.S., mobile and manufactured houses are constructed in accordance with HUD building codes, while modular houses are constructed in accordance with the IRC (International Residential Code).

- Modular homes are created in sections and then transported to the home site for construction and installation. Although the sections of the house are prefabricated, the sections, or modules, are put together at the construction much like a typical home.
- Manufactured homes are built onto steel beams and are transported in complete sections to the home site, where they are assembled. Wheels, hitch and axles are removed on site when the home is placed on a permanent foundation.
- Mobile homes, or trailers, are built on wheels, and can be pulled by a vehicle. They are considered to be personal property and are licensed by the Dept. of Motor Vehicles. Tiny homes with wheels are included in this category. They must be built to the DMV code, and pass inspection for licensing.

== History ==
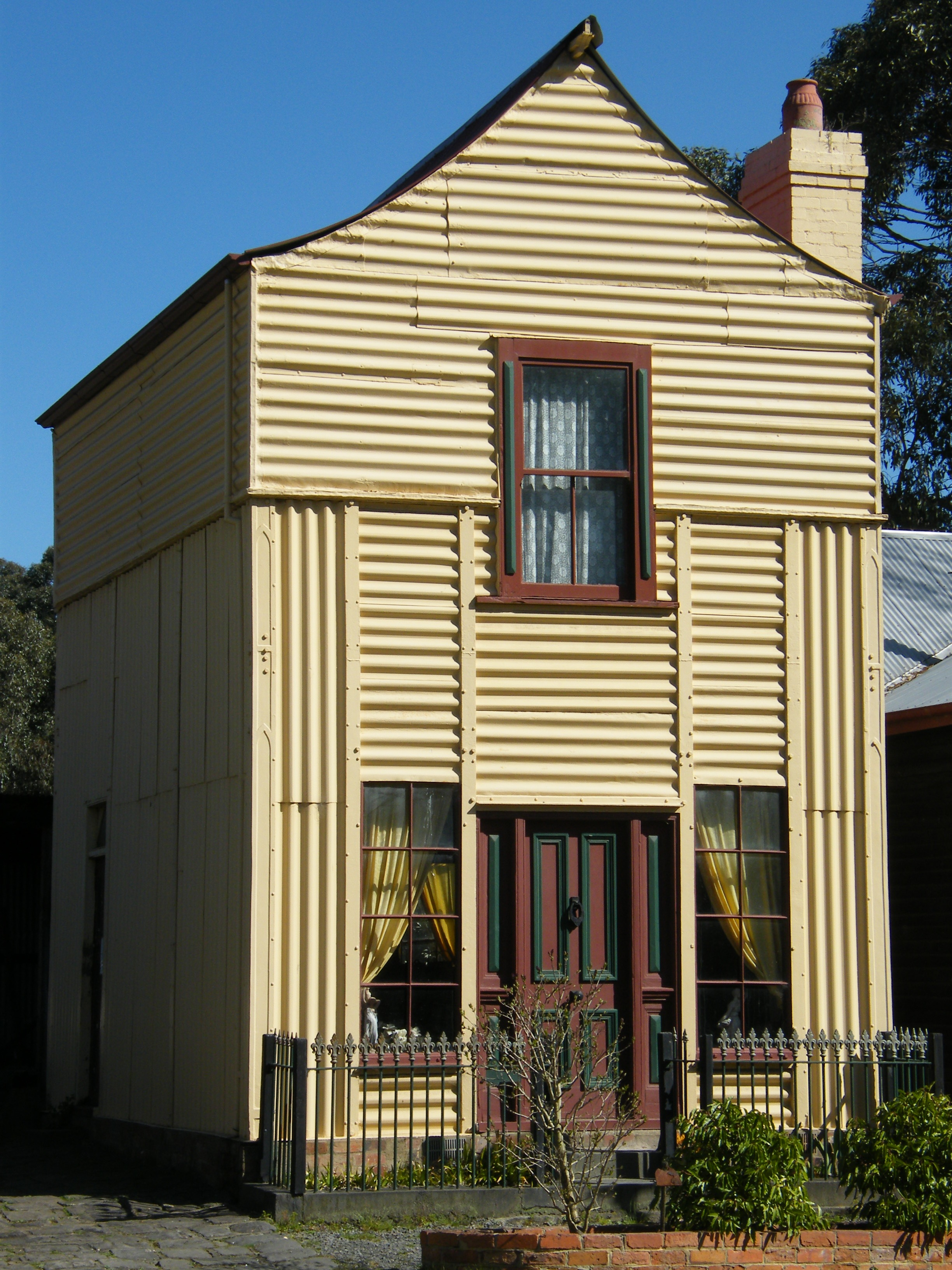
"Loren" Iron House, at Old Gippstown in Moe, Australia

The first mention of a prefabricated building was in 1160 to 1170 by Wace as confirmed by Pierre Bouet. In the special May/June 2015 edition of the French magazine Historia, he spoke of a castle transported by Normans in 'kit' form. According to Bouet, Wace's epic poem Roman de Rou, verses 6,516–6,526, states: "They took out of the ship beams of wood and dragged them to the ground. Then the Count (Earl) who brought them, (the beams) already pierced and planed, carved and trimmed, the pegs (raw-plugs/dowels) already trimmed and transported in barrels, erected a castle, had a moat dug around it and thus had constructed a big fortress during the night."

Movable structures were used in 16th century in India by Emperor Akbar The Great. These structures were reported by Arif Qandahari in 1579.

In the United States, several companies, including Sears Catalog Homes, began offering mail-order kit homes between 1902 and 1910. The Forest Products Laboratory, a division of the U.S. Forest Service, put extensive research into prefabricated homes in the 1930s, including building one for the 1935 Madison Home Show. This research continued into the 1960s.

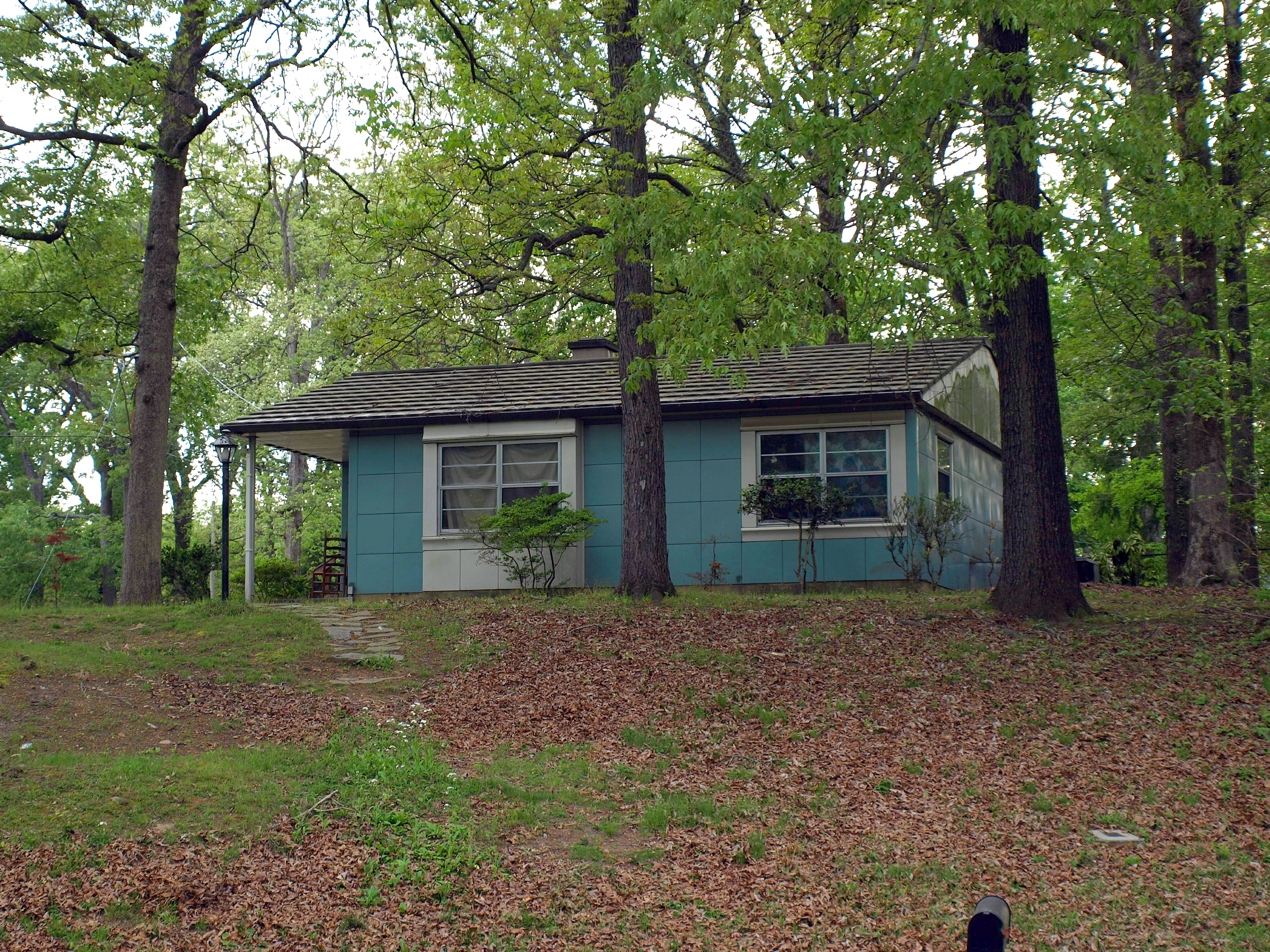
A Lustron House

Lustron houses were mass-produced, prefabricated, enameled steel, houses developed in the post-World War II era United States. Lustron Corporation manufactured homes that were clad in coated steel panels Over 2,000 homes were constructed during Lustron's brief production period, and they proved to be extremely durable with many still in use seventy years later (2020). Lustron production ceased in 1950 due to the company's inability to pay back the startup loans it had received from the Reconstruction Finance Corporation.

In the early to mid-1960s, a line of inexpensive Leisurama prefabricated houses designed by Andrew Geller, were made available for purchase from a display on the ninth floor of Macy's in New York City and shown at the 1964 New York World's Fair. The precursor to the final design had been shown in Moscow in 1959 provoking the noted Kitchen Debate between Vice President Richard Nixon and Soviet Premier Nikita Khrushchev. Over 200 Leisurama houses were built at the Culloden Point development in Montauk, New York between 1963 and 1965.

By 1958, roughly 10 percent of new houses in the United States were prefabricated.

== Contemporary domestic prefabrication ==
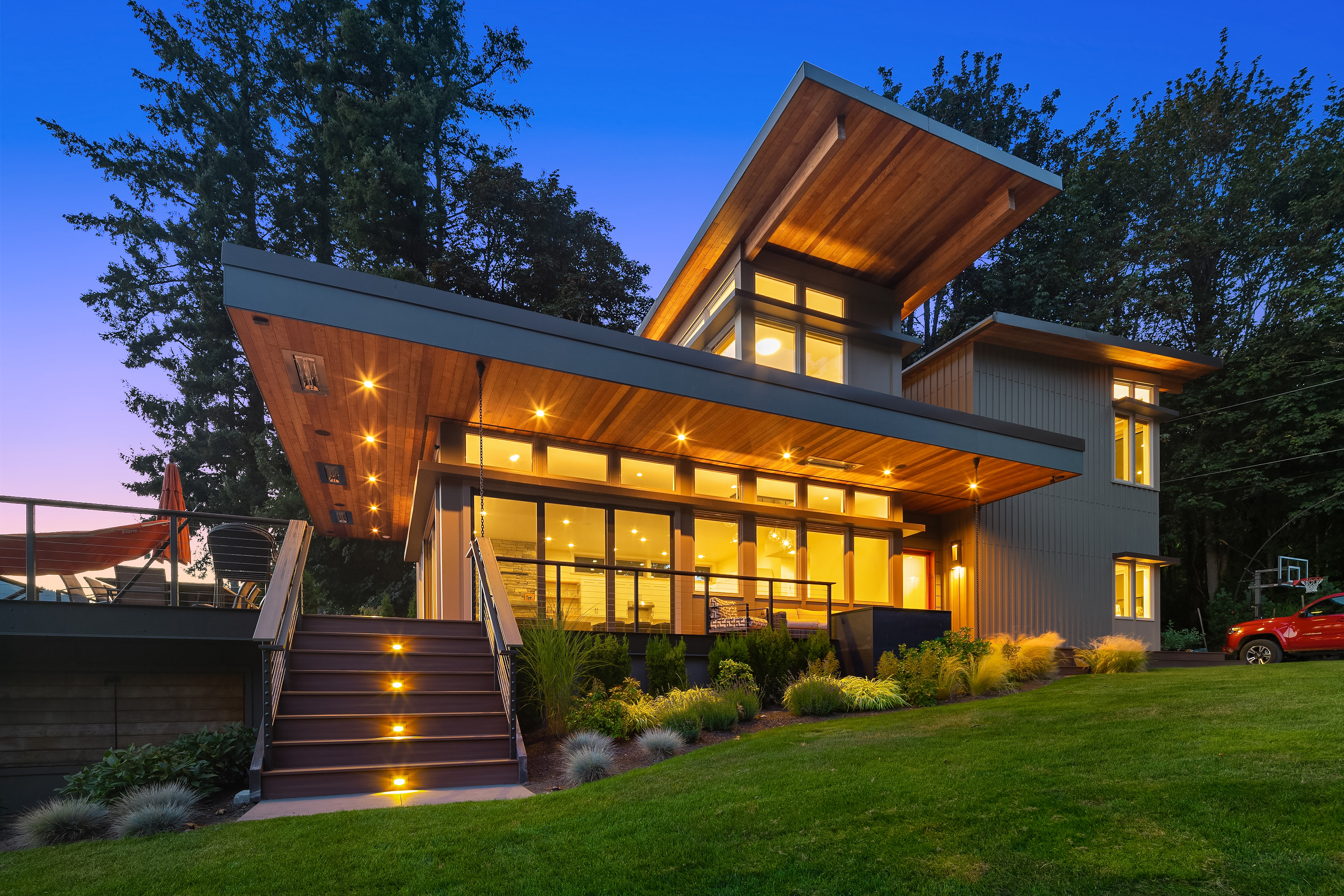
An example of a completed panelized home in Lake Whatcom, United States.

Currently, the prefabricated housing industry is divided by methodology of construction. Panelized, Modular, and Manufactured home design make up the majority of contemporary firms, with considerable overlap between the construction methods.

=== Panelized homes ===
Panelized homes (also referred to as system built homes), construct the structural components, or "panels", of a home (walls, roof and floor systems) in an off site factory where the panels are cut via automated saws and laser cutters from large wooden sheets, allowing for lower amount of waste compared to site-built construction. Following their cutting and shaping, panels are stacked and delivered to the jobsite where the home is assembled piecemeal in a similar method to traditional site-built home.

Panelized homes are generally considered a halfway between more traditional site-built home and more manufactured prefabs, with the flexibility of site-build and efficiency of prefab.

=== Modular houses ===
Modular houses are built using a system that involves a sequential process in which modern techniques such as 3D digital modeling are now being used, which allows for pre-planning to make the process more efficient.

This type of construction is typically up to 50% faster and requires up to 50% less materials than conventional or traditional construction. The size of the global modular construction market is expected to reach US$271 billion by 2028.

== North America ==
=== United States ===
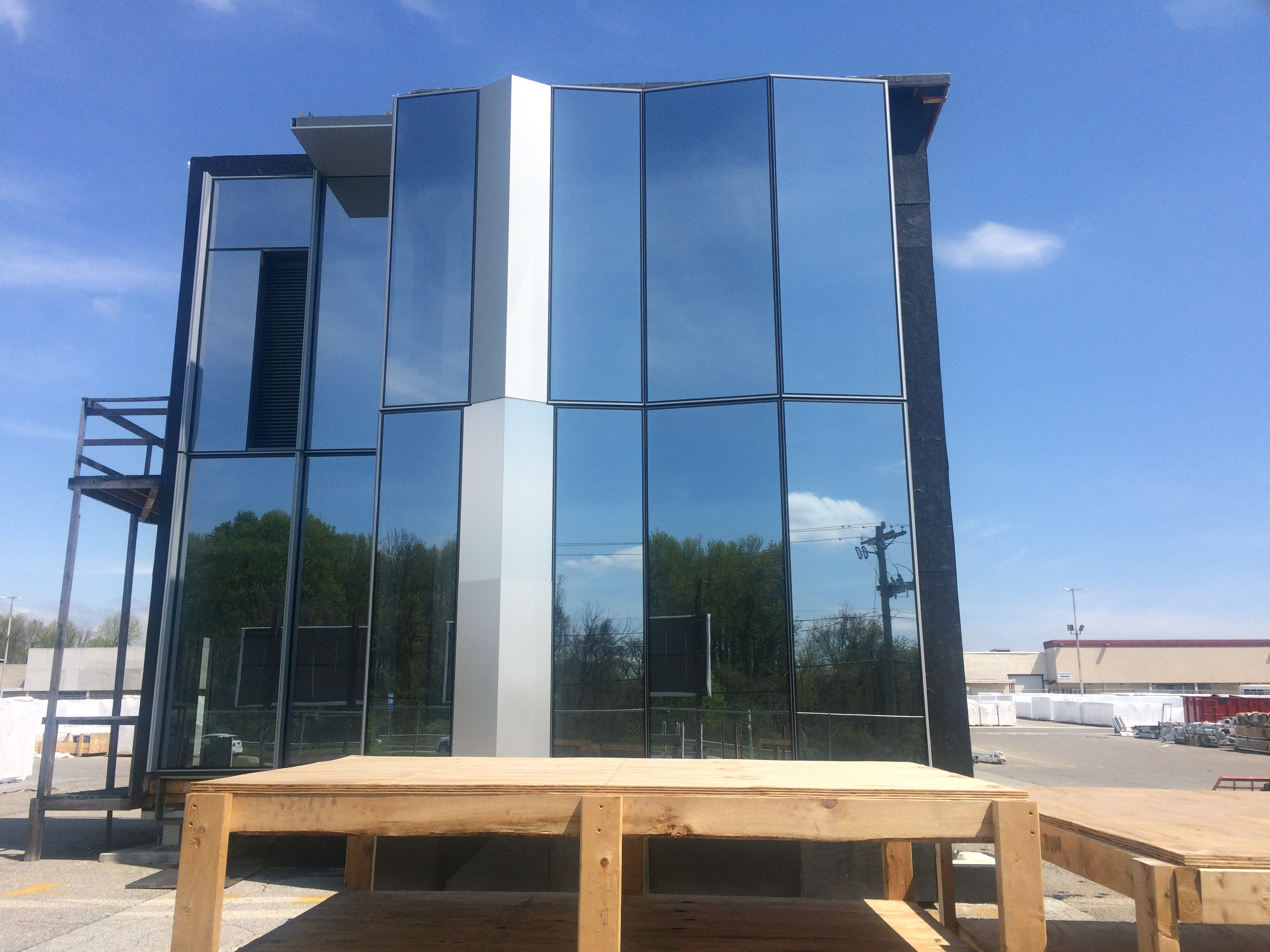
Prefabricated housing unit in storage in Claymont, Delaware

The total market share of non-site built single-family homes (modular and panelized) was at 3% of single-family completions in 2024, according to the National Association of Home Builders Economic Research Blog.This share has been steadily declining since the early-2000s.

== Europe ==
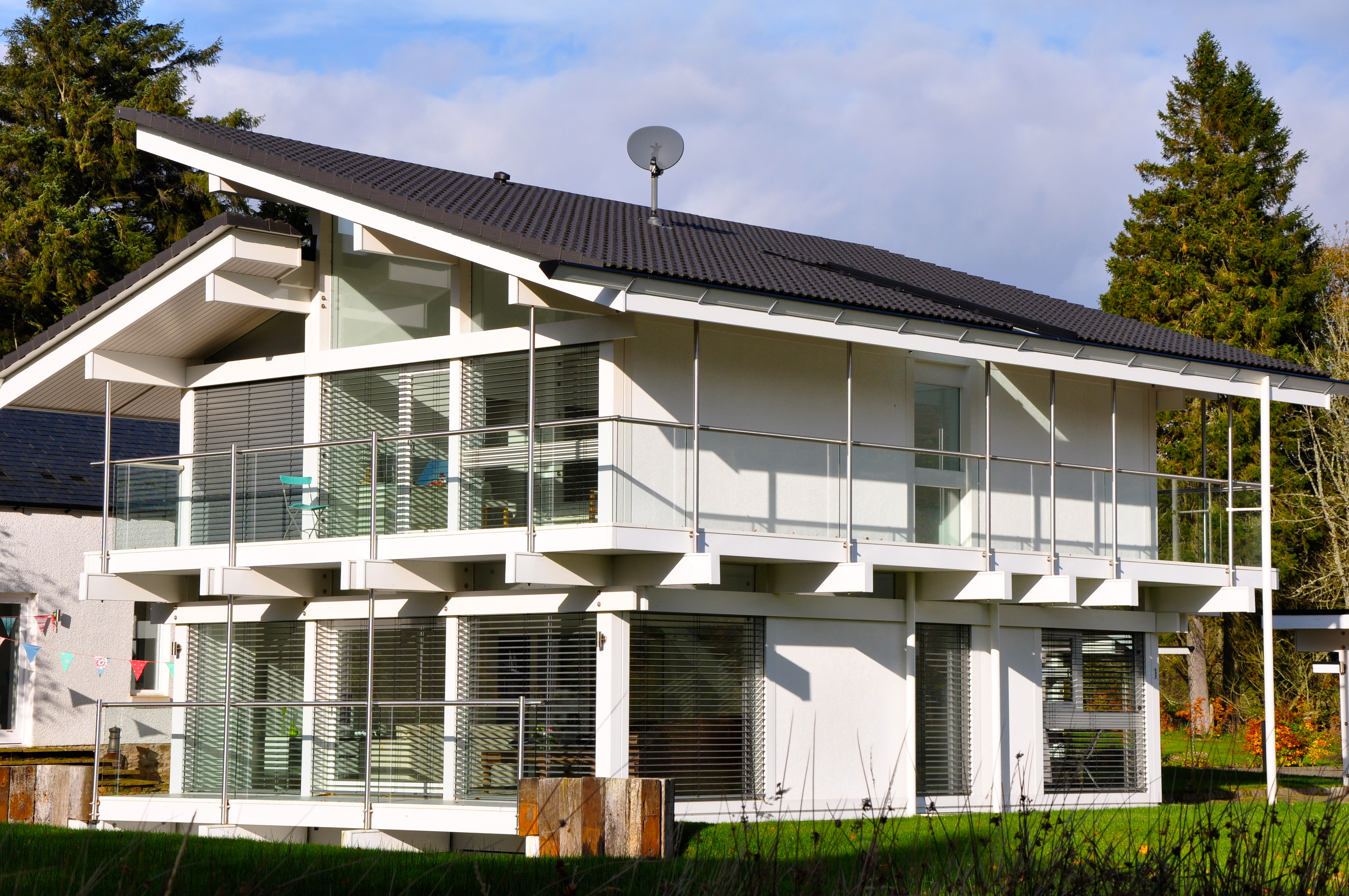
German-manufactured Huf Haus near West Linton, Scotland.

In the 1940s French designer Jean Prouvé designed an aluminum prefabricated house, the Maison Tropicale, for use in Africa.

After the World War II until 1948, Sell-Fertighaus GmbH built over 5,000 prefabricated houses in Germany for the occupying force of the United States.

There is no pan-EU housing standard for this kind of home construction, and regulation is at the national level. EU directives that apply to housing construction and design do not directly affect the modular home sector. However, each modular home must comply with EU's Eurocodes and local building codes.

=== United Kingdom ===
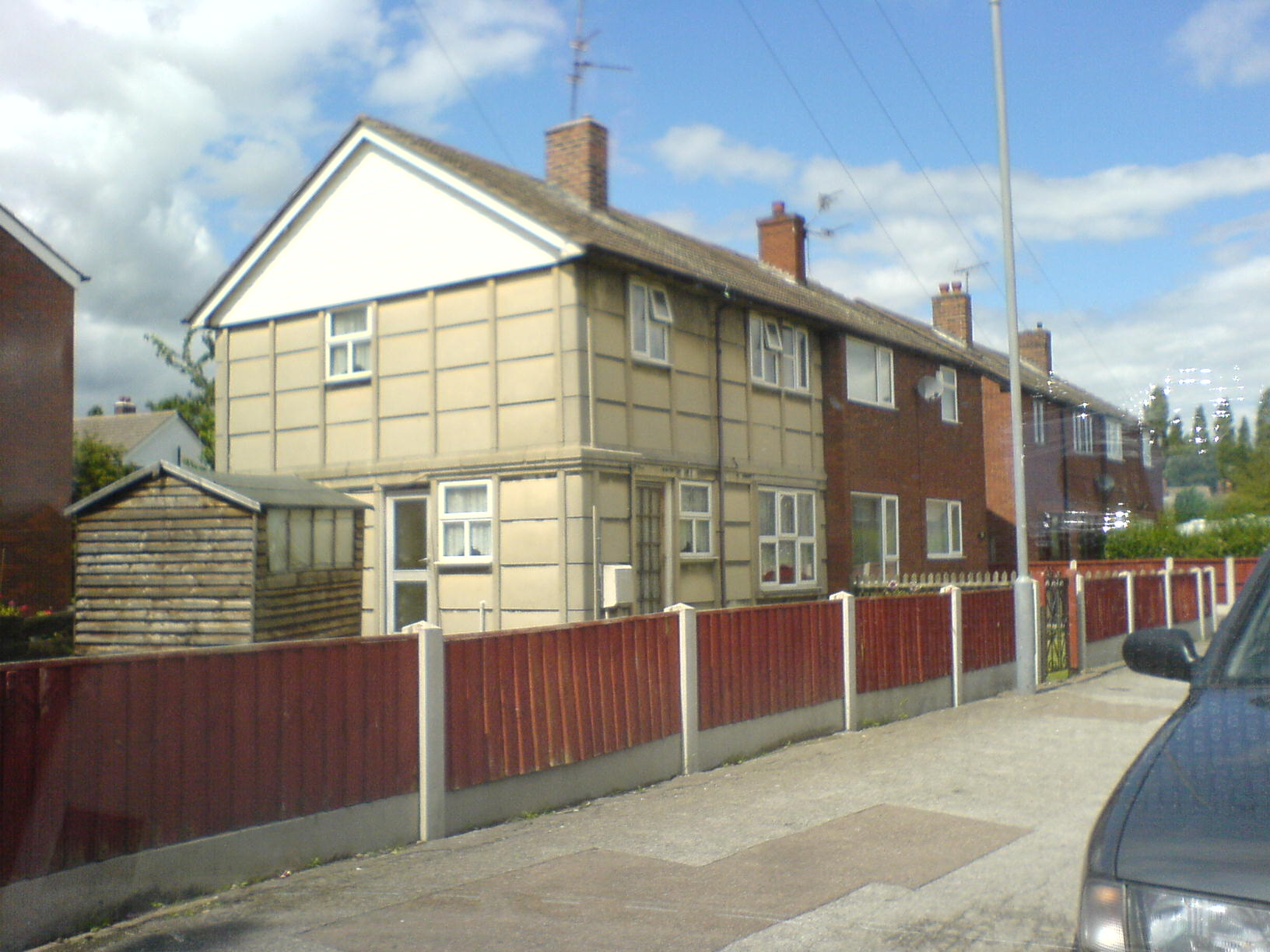
A post-Second World War English prefabricated house, adjoining a similar refurbished property clad in brick

In the United Kingdom, the word "prefab" is often associated with specific types of prefabricated single or two-story homes built in large numbers after World War II, such as Airey houses, as a temporary replacement for housing that had been destroyed by bombs, particularly in London. More than 156,000 prefabricated homes were built between 1945 and 1948. Prefabs were also built in World War I, such as the still-occupied houses in Austin Village, Birmingham.

Despite the intention that these dwellings would be a temporary measure, many remained inhabited many decades after the end of World War II. Roughly 8,000 are still in use today, but others are being demolished. In 2011 it was announced that Britain's largest remaining prefab estate of 187 homes in Lewisham, South-East London, was to be redeveloped except for six homes.

==== MMC and modular homes ====
During the 2010s, as government backing (including via Homes England) for 'modern methods of construction' (MMC) grew, several UK companies (for example, Ilke Homes, L&G Modular and Homes by Urban Splash) were established to develop modular homes as an alternative to traditionally built residences. A development of 36 apartments, called y:cube, was constructed by SIG Plc Building Systems for the YMCA in Mitcham, South London in 2015. From its Knaresborough, Yorkshire factory (opened in 2018, closed in 2023), Ilke Homes delivered two- and three-bedroom 'modular' homes that could be erected in 36 hours.

In January 2024, following the high-profile failures of Ilke Homes, L&G Modular and Homes by Urban Splash during 2022 and 2023, the House of Lords Built Environment Committee highlighted that the UK Government needed to take a more coherent approach to addressing barriers affecting adoption of MMC: "If the Government wants the sector to be a success, it needs to take a step back, acquire a better understanding of how it works and the help that it needs, set achievable goals and develop a coherent strategy."

== Australia and Asia ==
In 2010, Bali exported 98,417 prefabricated houses, but in 2011 the region only exported 5,007 units due to the global economic slowdown that affected a number of export destinations. These Balinese prefab houses are well known for their artistic design and practical value.

== See also ==
- Manufactured housing
- Reefer container housing units
- Modular building
- Prefabrication
