= Off-site construction =

Offsite construction refers to the planning, design, manufacture and assembly of building elements at a location other than their final installed location to support the rapid speed of, and efficient construction of a permanent structure. Such building elements may be prefabricated offsite in a different location and transported to the site or prefabricated on the construction site and then transported to their final location. Offsite construction is characterized by an integrated planning and supply chain optimization strategy. Offsite manufacturing (OSM), offsite production (OSP) and offsite fabrication (OSF) are terms used when referring primarily to the factory work proper.

== Building configurations ==
Off-site construction (like on-site construction) can be used for a variety of purposes including residential, educational, health care and commercial applications. Buildings can range from a few modular units to several hundred. They can be arranged in architectural configurations and can be many stories in height.

== Advantages of off-site construction ==
Boston Consulting Group writers Romain de Laubier et al. identify six advantages of offsite construction:

- Shorter timescales
- Reduced risk
- Higher quality
- Reduction in costs
- Preferable working environment
- Lower environmental impact.

Where these factors are measurable, they suggest, for example, that best-in-class offsite construction operates with a defect-free rate for new buildings at over 95%, and that construction waste and emissions can be reduced by 50% in comparison with onsite construction building completion times can be cut by one third. One area where risk is reduced relates to the engagement of subcontractors. Beyond individual industry figures, researchers have proposed standardised indicators to systematically measure these benefits, such as time and cost certainty factors that compare planned schedules and budgets against actual project outcomes, alongside indices quantifying the degree of industrialisation and off-site manufacturing in a given project. These indicators are intended to complement existing sustainability assessment frameworks, such as LEED and BREEAM, which have been noted to focus predominantly on environmental criteria while giving limited attention to the economic and social dimensions associated with process control and logistics in industrialised construction.

== Similarities ==
Off-site construction is very similar to modular construction, but it is focused primarily on permanent construction; modular construction can be either permanent or relocatable. Also known as offsite construction, or OSC, and also incorporates many MMC - or modern methods of construction technologies.

== History ==
Prefabrication of building components has been ongoing since the industrial revolution, especially with the adoption of the balloon frame construction method in the 1830s. Applied to single-family homes, it gave rise to many kit homes, such as the Sears Modern Homes imagined by the eponymous company in 1908.

The rise of steel frames and the first skyscrapers led to the industrial production of steel components, produced off-site. In 1930, the Empire State building, one of the most famous skyscrapers in New-York City, was built essentially off site, in the record time of one year and 45 days. Thanks to the prefabricated elements, a new floor was built every day, seven every week. After the Second World War, Walter Gropius and Konrad Wachsmann drew a new type of prefabricated single-family house, based on a grid of wooden panels and a seamless metal assembly.

Today, the most widely used form of prefabrication in building and civil engineering is the use of prefabricated concrete and prefabricated steel sections in structures where a particular part or form is repeated many times.

From the 1990s, industry experts and scholars started using the term off-site construction has been in use since the 1990s to consider technological, engineering and industrialization evolutions in the building sector. Off-site construction is a subject of research since at least 2004.

== Public Policy ==
=== In the UK ===
In 2004, a study of the building and civil engineering department of the Loughborough University showed the interest of off-site construction to enhance building quality. In 2017, the British government ordered the Farmer Review of the UK Construction Labour Model. The review highlighted the weaknesses of traditional methods of construction, especially their lack of productivity, and called for the widespread adoption of off-site construction. As a result, in 2020, the UK Department for Education announced a 3 £billion investment to build one hundred and twenty off-site schools in four years.

=== In North America ===
The North America off-site construction market size was valued at $49,460.1 million in 2021, and is projected to reach $80,851.3 million by 2031, registering a CAGR of 4.9% from 2022 to 2031. In May 2022, the Cree Nation communities in Canada received $17.4 million to deploy modular housing. Such factors are anticipated to significantly boost the North America off-site construction market. An Autodesk study mentions 6.000 houses built off-site every year, that is 12% of the new homes built in a year.

=== In Australia ===
Led by current research drawing attention to the industry’s potential, Melbourne School of Engineering and the Centre for Advanced Manufacturing of Prefabricated Housing wants to grow the prefab market share within the Australian construction industry from five per cent to 15 per cent by 2025.

== Realizations ==
=== 122, Lendenhall, London ===
This 225-meter tower, created by Richard Rogers, was finished in 2014. It was built 80% off-site.

=== Hotel Jakarta, Amsterdam ===
A 30 meters high hotel, made by SeArch Agency. 176 of the 200 rooms were prefabricated.

== Off-site construction companies ==
=== In Europe ===
==== TopHat ====
TopHat is a British start-up born in 2019, it conceives modular buildings made of recycled and bio sourced materials. It first realization started in 2018 and achieved in 2019. The company received a capital investment from Goldman Sachs.

==== Vonovia ====
In Germany, the largest residential property company, Vonovia, with €33 billion under management, delivered its first modular operation of 38 homes on the outskirts of Wiesbaden, a city of 300,000 inhabitants, in 2018.

==== GA Smart building ====
GA Smart Building is a pioneer on the off-site construction in France. The off-site approach of this developer and builder dates from the 1970s. It has eight French factories, three for wood in the Loire and Vosges regions, three for concrete in Normandy, the Grand-Est and Occitanic regions, one for thermal and lighting comfort equipment and one for joinery.

=== In America ===
==== Full Stack Modular ====
Full Stack Modular, an American off-site player with a similar positioning, set up its main factory in Brooklyn in 2016 and has been operating it ever since.

==== Dvele ====
Dvele is a designer and producer of high-end prefabricated homes. Their modular homes are marketed to both individual home buyers as well as larger, multi-unit developers. They currently offer 20 different floor plans which range from 705 square foot tiny homes and ADUs to large, two-story homes with nearly 4,000 square feet of living space.

== See also ==
- Prefabrication
- Modular building
- Modular classroom
- Modular design
- Modular home
- Open source architecture
- Prefabricated Home
