= Farmer Review of the UK Construction Labour Model =

Report on the construction industry in the UK

The Farmer Review of the UK Construction Labour Model, commonly known as the Farmer Review or by its subtitle Modernise or Die, was a 2016 report commissioned by the British Government. Written by industry veteran Mark Farmer, it identified key failings in the British construction industry. Farmer stated that research and development was almost non-existent, productivity was low and cost inflation high. He also noted a lack of skilled workers required to deliver the government's infrastructure and housebuilding targets. Farmer made ten key recommendations for the industry to follow which included reform of the Construction Industry Training Board, greater use of off-site construction techniques, greater promotion of the industry to school children, reform of tax and planning processes and for implementation of a 0.5% tax on clients in projects that do not follow the recommendations. The government later agreed to implement all of the recommendations except for the additional taxation.

== Report ==
The report was written by Mark Farmer, the founding director and CEO of Cast Consultancy and an expert with 25 years' experience in the construction industry. It had been commissioned through the UK Construction Leadership Council at the request of the departments for Communities and Local Government (CLG) and for Business, Energy and Industrial Strategy (BEIS). The government were keen to reform the industry which had a reputation for poor productivity, poor reputation as a good career with young people, a reliance on casual labour, poor investment in training and a fragmented supply chain. Repeated government reviews since the early 1990s has done little to transform it. Farmer produced an 80-page report in October 2016 and subtitled it "Modernise or Die – Time to decide the industry's future."

Farmer stated that he had found that the arrangements for training in the industry were dysfunctional and that investment in research and development was almost non-existent. As a result, the sector's productivity was low, levels of innovation were poor and cost inflation was high. He also found a shortage of skilled workers exacerbated by a larger number of people leaving the industry each year than were joining it. On the latter issue Farmer stated that the available workforce would decrease by 25% over the following ten years, a scenario that would be significantly worsened by the impact of Brexit. This shortage could jeopardise the industry's ability to meet the infrastructure and housebuilding targets set by the government. He was particularly critical of the housebuilding side of the industry.

Farmer's review made ten key recommendations:

1. For the Construction Leadership Council (CLC) to co-ordinate the implementation of the recommendations and to itself be reformed to better represent the make-up of the industry.
2. For the Construction Industry Training Board (CITB) to be fundamentally reformed and a review undertaken of its current training levy to make it more efficient.
3. For contractors, consultants, clients and the government to work within the framework provided by the CLC to improve relationships and collaboration across the supply chain and to increase investment in research and development.
4. For contractors, consultants, clients and the government to work within the framework provided by the CLC to investigate innovative solutions to the housing shortage, for example through the sharing of off-site construction facilities with small and medium enterprises.
5. For the CITB to change its grant funding process to focus on those skills relevant to the future of the industry and for industry bodies and professional institutions to become more involved in the way talent is developed.
6. For the CITB or a new body to take charge of improving the public image of the industry particularly through school outreach programmes aimed at those aged 11 and over.
7. For the government to take a more interventionist stance on the industry with new policies on education, planning, tax and employment. For the government to implement reform of the way section 106 agreements are made to streamline the planning process. For the treasury to reform the Construction Industry Scheme to disincentivise false declarations of self employment.
8. For the government to encourage use of pre-fabricated components in construction (off-site construction methods) by providing tax incentives for research and development funding, by encouraging housing authorities to specify such techniques and by introducing advantages in the planning system for schemes using these methods.
9. For the government to implement a new housebuilding pipeline, similar to the national infrastructure pipeline already in place, to give private sector companies greater visibility of the predicted future demand for housing.
10. For the government to introduce a 0.5% tax of the total project value on every client that does not implement the other recommendations, and for this tax to be introduced within the next five years and for all money raised to be reinvested into technological development.

Farmer warned that the British government should not simply cherry pick the ideas that it liked or that were easiest to implement but should take the review as a whole. He wanted change to be driven primarily by private sector clients - who make up around 75% by value of all construction work commissioned in the UK. Farmer said at the time of his report's release that "we're entering a phase in construction where productivity's going to make or break the industry" and that "the only way we're going to [deliver the government's infrastructure and commercial targets] is by getting more productive". He was keen to see the industry make greater use of robotics, machine learning and automated planning decisions by use of digital design.

== Impact ==
The official government response to the report was issued in July 2017 and written by Baron Prior, Parliamentary Under Secretary of State at the BEIS; Alok Sharma, Housing and Planning minister at the CLG and Anne Milton, Minister of State for Skills and Apprenticeships at the Department for Education and Minister for Women. They agreed to implement all of Farmer's recommendations except the last - the 0.5% project value tax - saying they feared it would reduce the number of construction projects carried out. They committed to a reform of the CITB and its levy and stated that there was support for greater use of off-site manufacturing in an existing housing white paper. Farmer commented that he was happy that the government had agreed to implement the vast majority of his recommendations and that it was working to bring about a "modern and fit for purpose construction industry".

The review was described in the press at the time of its release as a "damning report" that warned that the industry faced "inexorable decline" unless it reforms. Other commentators stated that to help contractors to achieve the recommendations there would need to be more major, long-term projects and larger frameworks brought forward to provide certainty that the contractor would be able to achieve a return on their investment. The review was cited in July 2018 as an example of the reforms needed for the construction industry in New Zealand. The CLC's July 2018 report Procuring for Value built on the Farmer Review and advocated serious reform for the procurement and tender process with a shift away from the "lowest cost bid" mentality towards an approach that takes into account quality and risk.
