= Andrew Geller =

American architect (1924–2011)

- Born: Andrew Michael Geller; April 17, 1924; Brooklyn, New York
- Died: December 25, 2011 (aged 87); Syracuse, New York
- Occupation: Architect
- Parent(s): Olga Geller; Joseph Geller
- Buildings: Elizabeth Reese House (1955); Pearlroth House (1958); Esquire Weekend House; Leisurama

Andrew Michael Geller (April 17, 1924 – December 25, 2011) was an American architect, painter, and graphic designer. He is widely known for his uninhibited, sculptural beach houses in the coastal regions of New York, New Jersey, and Connecticut during the 1950s and '60s, as well as for his indirect role in the 1959 Kitchen Debate between Richard Nixon (then Vice President) and Soviet Premier Nikita Khrushchev, which began at an exhibit Geller had helped design for the American National Exhibition in Moscow.

Geller worked with the prominent firm of American industrial and graphic designer Raymond Loewy where his projects ranged widely—from the design of shopping centers and department stores across the United States, to the Windows on the World restaurant atop the World Trade Center and the logo of New York-based department store Lord & Taylor.

After designing a beach house for Loewy's director of public relations, Geller was featured in The New York Times and began receiving notoriety for his own work. Between 1955 and 1974, Geller produced a series of modest but distinctive vacation homes, many published in popular magazines including Life, Sports Illustrated, and Esquire.

On his death in 2011, The New York Times said Geller "helped bring modernism to the masses."

== Background ==
It’s one of the first lessons I ever was taught. The thing you produce ought to be compatible with what’s there. It should live with it both in scale and some sort of human factor.

— Andrew Geller

Geller was born in Brooklyn on April 17, 1924, to Olga and Joseph Geller, an artist and sign painter who had emigrated from Hungary in 1905. Architectural historian Alastair Gordon reported that as a sign painter Joseph Geller designed the logo for Boar's Head Provision Company, still in use today.

Geller studied drawing with his father, and the attended art classes at the Brooklyn Museum. A 1938 painted self-portrait won him a scholarship to the New York High School of Art and Music (1939), and he subsequently studied architecture at Cooper Union, where he took drawing class with Robert Gwathmey, father of architect Charles Gwathmey. Geller later worked as a naval architect for the United States Maritime Commission designing tanker hulls and interiors (1939–42).

During World War II, Geller served in the U.S. Army Corps of Engineers (1942–45) and was inadvertently exposed to a toxic chemical agent, suffering medical consequences for the remainder of his life. Geller married Shirley Morris (a painter) in 1944. The couple lived in Northport, New York, and together had a son, Gregg Geller (formerly catalog executive at RCA, CBS and Warner Bros.) and a daughter, Jamie Geller Dutra (formerly interior designer at Loewy/Snaith).

Prior to his death in December 2011 in Syracuse, Geller lived in Spencer, New York.

== Career with Loewy ==
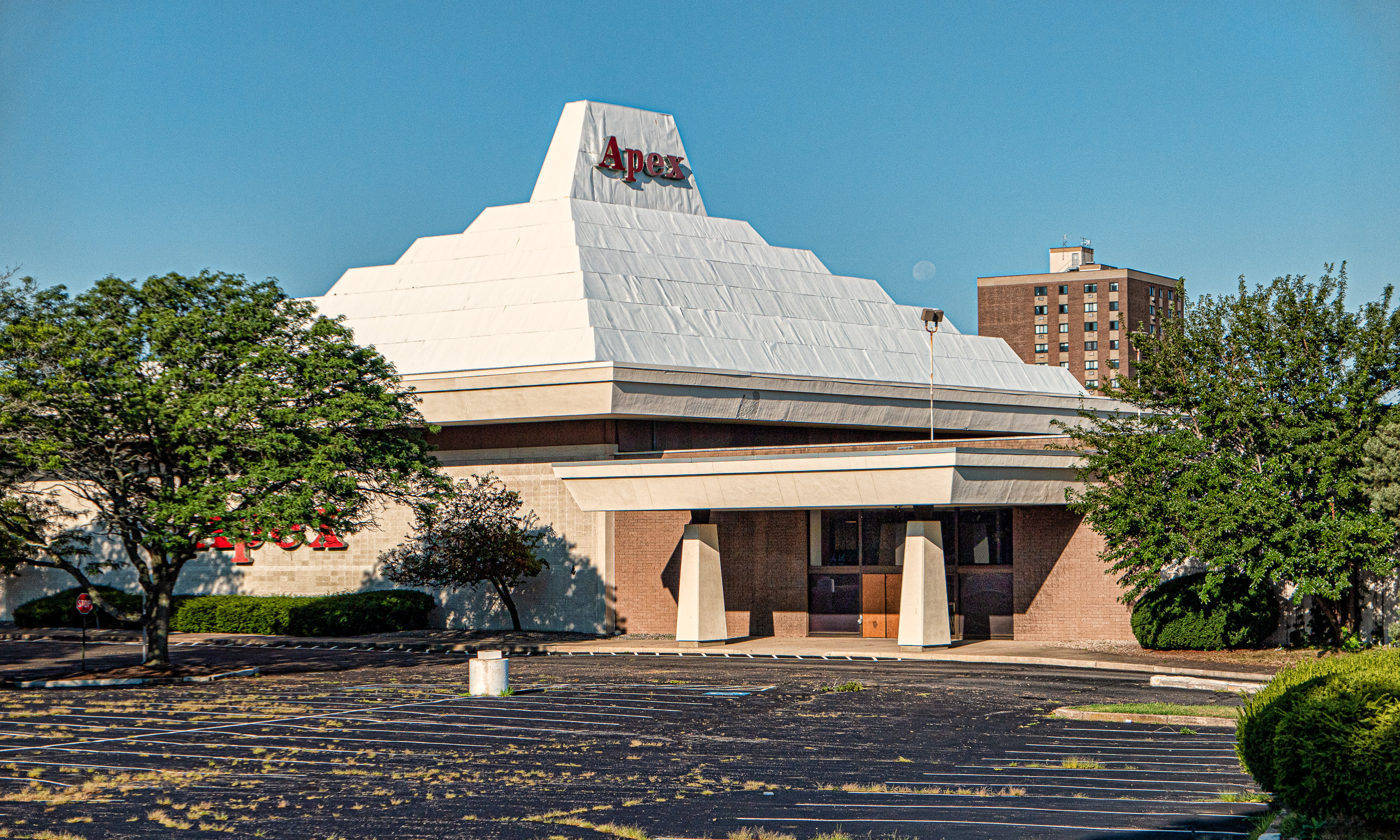
Apex Department Store Building, Pawtucket, Rhode Island (1969)

After reading in Life magazine of Raymond Loewy's diverse and comprehensive career, Geller began what became a career (variously reported as 28 or 35 years) at Raymond Loewy Associates — later known as Raymond Loewy/William Snaith Inc. or simply Loewy/Snaith.

Geller went on to carry various titles at Loewy/Snaith, including 'head of the New York City architecture department', 'vice president' and 'director of design,' — working on notable projects including the interiors and garden (with Isamu Noguchi) for the glass-and-metal Lever House. At Loewy/Snaith, Geller also designed shopping centers and department stores across the United States, notably for Macy's, Lord & Taylor, Wanamaker's, Bloomingdales, Apex Department Stores and Daytons — as well as work for Bell Telephone, and the Worlds Fair Beirut U.S. Pavilion (year unknown).

Geller left Loewy/Snaith in 1976. It has been reported that at some point in his career, Geller designed the Quiet House for a Dallas, Texas, consortium, the all-aluminum Easy Care Home for the Aluminum Association of America, and the Vacation House System.

In 2009, the city of Stamford, Connecticut, listed the 150,000 square foot Lord & Taylor at 110 High Ridge Road on the state's list of landmark buildings — after the building had been inadvertently made more prominent by the razing of adjacent trees. Geller had designed the three-story building in 1969 while with Loewy/Snaith. Richard Longstreth, director of the Graduate Program in Historic Preservation at George Washington University, said the store's case for preservation was “quite straightforward, based on the significance of the company it has housed, the nature of its siting, the firm that designed the building, and as a now rare survivor of its type."

=== Kitchen Debate and Leisurama ===
In 1959, as vice president of the Housing and Home Components department at Loewy/Snaith, Geller was the design supervisor for the exhibition, the "Typical American House," built at the American National Exhibition in Moscow. The exhibition home largely replicated a home previously built at 398 Townline Road in Commack, New York, which had been originally designed by Stanley H. Klein for a Long Island-based firm, All-State Properties (later known as Sadkin enterprises), headed by developer Herbert Sadkin. To accommodate visitors to the exhibition, Sadkin hired Loewy's office to modify Klein's floor plan. Geller supervised the work, which "split" the house, creating a way for large numbers of visitors to tour the small house and giving rise to its nickname, Splitnik.

Subsequently, Richard Nixon (then Vice President) and Soviet Premier Nikita Khrushchev on July 24, 1959, began what became known as the Kitchen Debate — a debate over the merits of capitalism vs. socialism, with Khrushchev saying Americans could not afford the luxury represented by the "Typical American House". Tass, the Soviet news agency said: "There is no more truth in showing this as the typical home of the American worker than, say, in showing the Taj Mahal as the typical home of a Bombay textile worker."

The temporary 'Typical American House' exhibit was demolished, and the developer hired William Safire as the company's marketing agent. All-State later hired Loewy and Geller to design Leisurama, homes marketed at Macy's and built on Long Island — leveraging the press coverage from the Russian exhibition.

== Solo career ==
Geller became known for a number of homes in New England that he designed while moonlighting at Loewy/Snaith, with the encouragement of Loewy and Snaith. The houses each had an abstract sculptural quality; a 1999 New York Times article called the homes "eccentrically free-form and eye-grabbing." Another article called the homes "ingenious wooden spacecraft." Another described the houses as "quirky, tiny, site-specific." Geller himself gave the houses nicknames such as the Butterfly, the Box Kite, Milk Carton and Grasshopper.

Geller's work met a varied reception. Mark Lamster, writing for Design Observer, described Geller's Long Island house designs as "inexpensive and modest homes with playful shapes that radiated a sense of post-war optimism." His 1966 design for the Elkin House in Sagaponack, New York, which he called Reclining Picasso was described as "an angular mess" in a 2001 The New York Times book review.

Examples of Geller's idiosyncratic home designs include the 1955 Reese House for Elizabeth Reese in Sagaponack, New York — an A-Frame house that popularized the construction method after it was featured appeared on the cover of The New York Times as well as in the newspaper's real estate section of the May 5, 1957, edition. Reese, the client, was at the time the director of public relations at Loewy's office, and she publicized Geller's work — with John Callahan of The New York Times writing several articles on his work.

The Pearlroth House in Westhampton, of 1959, consists of a pair of diamond-shaped structures. When the 600 square foot Pearlroth home was slated for demolition in 2006, it was called an "icon of Modernism." The house — which featured two boxes rotated 45 degrees in a distinctive shape — was eventually relocated to be restored as a public museum. Architectural historian Alastair Gordon said the house "is one of the most important examples of experimental design built during the postwar period – not just on Long Island but anywhere in the United States. It is witty, bold and inventive."

In 1958, Geller designed a beach house for bachelors. The Esquire Weekend House could be delivered to any location to be constructed on stilts. Alastair Gordan, architectural historian, called the one-room house a "reducto ad absurdum version of the post-war weekend aesthetic."

== Publicity ==
Geller's architectural designs on Long Island were featured in a 1999 exhibition called Weekend Utopia: The Modern Beach House on Eastern Long Island, 1960–1973, at the Guild Hall Museum in East Hampton, New York — and in 2005 at an exhibit entitled Imagination: The Art and Architecture of Andrew Geller at New York's Municipal Art Society.

Geller's grandson, Jake Gorst, wrote, produced and directed a 2005 documentary about his grandfather's work on the Leisurama homes. Since 2011, Gorst has actively sought to preserve the archives of Geller's works, including drawings, models and film recordings — having used Kickstarter to help finance the archival work.

Geller's Long Island Homes were subject of the 2003 book Beach Houses: Andrew Geller. The Macy's homes were the subject of the 2008 book Leisurama Now: The Beach House for Everyone, by Paul Sahre. In 2001, his Pearlroth house was named one of the "10 Best Houses in the Hamptons."

== See also ==
- Leisurama
- Levittown
