= American National Exhibition =

1959 exhibition in Moscow

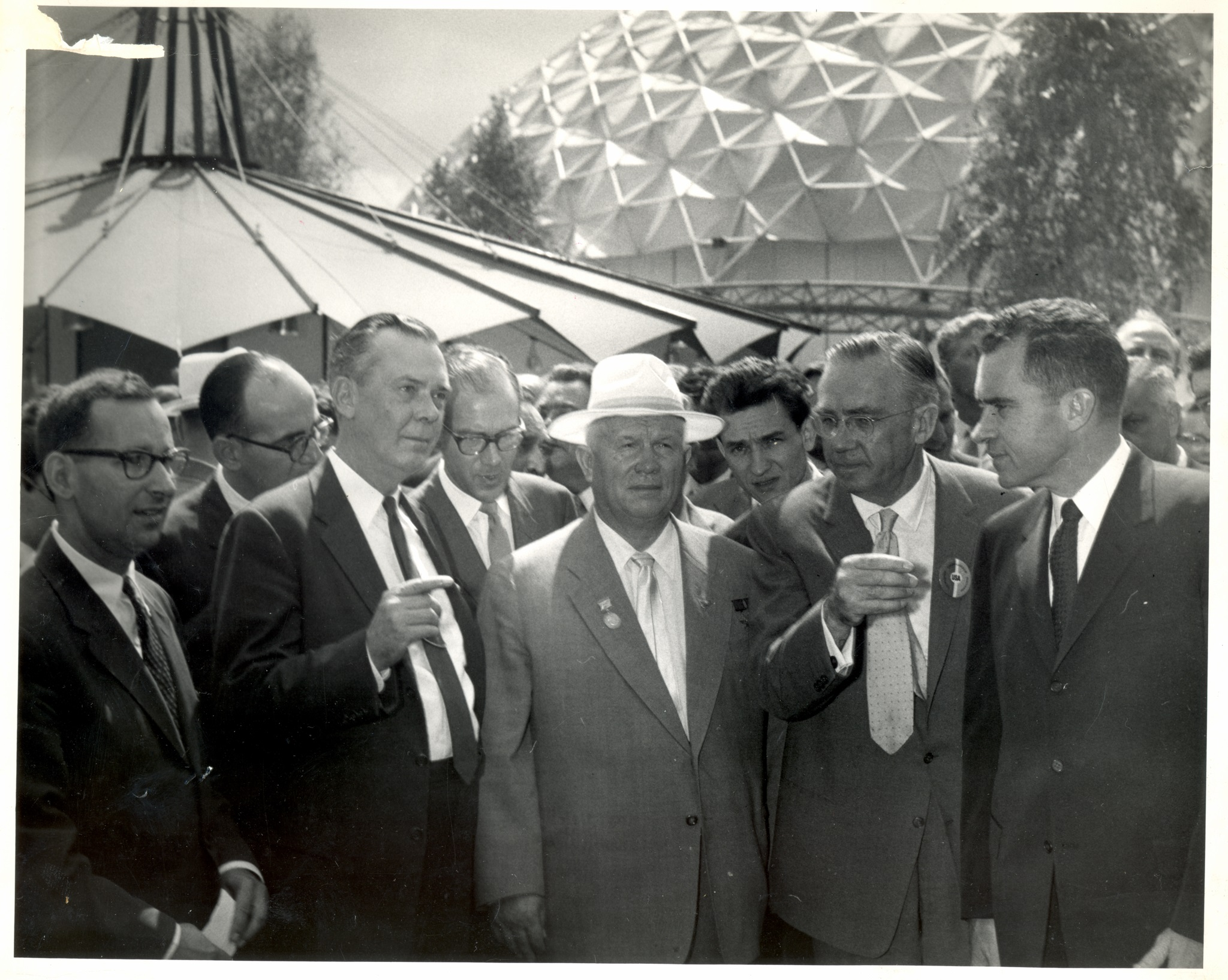
- Richard Nixon and Nikita Khrushchev at the American National Exhibition, July 1959
- Date: July 25 to Sept. 4, 1959
- Duration: Six weeks
- Venue: Sokolniki Park
- Location: Moscow, Russian SFSR, Soviet Union
- Motive: Diplomacy, capitalism, ideology
- Budget: $3.6 million
- Participants: Key figures in mid-century American art and design including artists Jack Levine, Isamu Noguchi, Hyman Bloom, Jackson Pollock, Edward Hopper and designers Charles and Ray Eames, Buckminster Fuller and Herman Miller.

The American National Exhibition, held from July 25 to September 4, 1959, was an exhibition of American art, fashion, cars, capitalism, model homes and futuristic kitchens. Held at Sokolniki Park in Moscow, then capital of the Soviet Union, the exhibition attracted 3 million visitors during its six-week run. The Cold War event is historic for the Kitchen Debate between then-U.S. vice president Richard Nixon and Soviet premier Nikita Khrushchev, held first at the model kitchen table, outfitted by General Electric, and then continued in the color television studio where it was broadcast to both countries, with each leader arguing the merits of his system, and a conversation that "escalated from washing machines to nuclear warfare."

But the event is equally renowned for its art exhibition, which included such celebrated artists as sculptors Robert Laurent, Ibram Lassaw and Isamu Noguchi and painters Hyman Bloom, Jackson Pollock and Edward Hopper in an art show coordinated by the United States Information Agency (USIA). Prior to the exhibition, the House Un-American Activities Committee (HUAC) threatened to remove many of the artists who had been accused of links to communist activities. After President Dwight D. Eisenhower intervened, however, the exhibition went on as planned.

Interpretations of the event are mixed. Some called the event a success because it humanized both countries, leading to better relations between them. Some also note that the event resulted in "a landmark contract to mass-manufacture Pepsi in the Soviet Union," creating new business opportunity, as well as a better relationship. But others argue that "[a] year later, the Cuban Missile Crisis brought both sides to the brink of nuclear war, and ties didn't begin improving until the 1970s." Meanwhile, liberal critics characterized the exhibition as an American Cold War "propaganda strategy."

== History ==
=== Political ===
New York Coliseum at Columbus Circle. Souvenir sheet of the Soviet Union 1959

The exhibit was sponsored by the American government, and "a similar exhibition was mounted by the Soviet Union at the Coliseum in New York City." Essentially organized as a cultural exchange, there were as many goals as there were interpretations of the event. Nixon, for example, used it as an occasion to increase his stature as an American leader and showcase American consumer goods.

The then vice president had embarked "on a ten-day tour of the Soviet Union that coincided with the exhibition in Moscow, and on the opening day, he and Khrushchev toured the exhibits together before the gates opened to the public." Using a videotape recorder, "one of the first to allow a live program to be easily recorded and quickly broadcasted on television," the two leaders stopped in one of four model U.S. kitchens, with each arguing the merits of his own system:

In the upcoming presidential election, Nixon would cite the Kitchen Debate as an example of his fierce diplomacy. Ironically, the Kitchen Debate likely gave Nixon overconfidence in his televised debating skill. Just over a year later, Nixon agreed to debate a young John F. Kennedy and was humiliated in the first televised presidential debate.

=== Race-related ===
"Even more so than art and fashion, it was the on-the-ground guides that would" serve to personalize America's presence in Moscow, answering questions and engaging in polite debate with Soviet visitors." The group included 27 women and 48 men," all purposefully younger than 35 to reflect America's youth. "All guides were fluent in Russian and some were (almost certainly) trained in intelligence gathering." Four of them were also black, and "President Eisenhower was apparently concerned with how they might represent the United States and its systemic violations of civil rights in 1959." So when he invited the guides to the White House for a meet-and-greet ahead of the exhibition, he "quizzed the black guides about how they came to be fluent in Russian." In the end, their answers reassured him that they would not give the Soviets reason to rebut America's emphasis on freedom with a discussion of inequality in America, and so, they were sent to Moscow as originally planned.

One of the exhibits was the IBM 305 RAMAC computer. It could answer over 4,000 questions within a wide range of topics Not only were common questions like "What is the price of American cigarettes?" and "What is jazz music?" answered with a printout in just 90 seconds, thornier questions about race relations and lynching were also pre-programmed to give diplomatic responses.

=== Commercial ===
Meanwhile, the exhibition itself was a showcase for the latest "home appliances, fashions, television and hi-fi sets, a model house priced to sell [to] an 'average' family, farm equipment, 1959 automobiles, boats, sporting equipment and a children's playground, as well as books and vinyl records." Overall, the various displays of the exhibit, which involved the designer George Nelson, showcased approximately "3,000 tons of material ... sent from the US to Moscow." Visitors could see everything from canned foods, tractors, and vinyl records to furniture and fittings, such as Herman Miller Bubble lamps; as well as a multiscreen film, Glimpses of the U.S.A. by fellow Herman Miller designers, Charles and Ray Eames. There were also "four demonstration kitchens ... with the RCA/Whirlpool Miracle Kitchen [being] the most futuristic." "It promised super-fast meal preparation, push-button everything, and automatic robot cleaners." Overall, "[a]bout 450 companies made contributions to the Moscow exhibition. Sears, IBM, General Mills, Kodak, Whirlpool, Macy's, Pepsi, General Motors, RCA, and Dixie Cup all had a presence, despite the fact that none of their products could be purchased in the Soviet Union."

"The Americans showed off a lot of consumer goods because—unlike heavy industry and space exploration—products like dishwashers and soda pop were areas where the U.S. was way ahead of Communist Russia. Largely unimpressed, Soviet leaders claimed that it was merely a bunch of gadgets. And in some ways they were right": Many of them weren't in American homes yet.

==== Pepsi ====
"Coca-Cola [had] declined to participate in the Exhibition, but Pepsi dove in with both feet." The PepsiCo executive present Donald Kendall convinced Nixon to arrange for Khrushchev to sample pepsi. He sampled pepsi made with water from both New York and Moscow and spoke positively of it. Kendall and Nixon would go on to maintain relations as Kendall funded the 1968 presidential campaign, and is heard in the second volume of the Watergate tapes. "This no doubt greased the wheels for Pepsi's entrance into the Soviet Union in 1972, after Nixon's re-election. Detente was succeeding in the early 1970s and there was a kind of swap: Pepsi would be introduced to the Soviet Union if Russian vodka could enter the American market....[T]he two countries signed a 10-year countertrade agreement, allowing Stolichnaya vodka in the U.S. and Pepsi into the USSR."

==== Splitnik ====
In 1959, the vice president of the Housing and Home Components department at Loewy/Snaith, Andrew Geller was the design supervisor for the exhibition, the "Typical American House," built at the American National Exhibition. The exhibition home largely replicated a home previously built at 398 Townline Road in Commack, New York, which had been originally designed by Stanley H. Klein for the Long Island-based firm All-State Properties, headed by developer Herbert Sadkin. To accommodate visitors to the exhibition, Sadkin hired Loewy's office to modify Klein's floor plan. According to one version of how the house got its name, Geller supervised the work, which "split" the house, creating its nickname "Splitnik," and a way for large numbers of visitors to tour the small house. In another version, it's said that [t]he Russians called the house the “Splitnik,” [as] a pun on “Sputnik,” the name of the satellite the Soviets had put into orbit two years before." At the exhibition the design of a "Typical American House" that was displayed featured a spacious kitchen and open floor.

Subsequently, the Vice President Richard Nixon and Soviet Premier Nikita Khrushchev began what became known as the Kitchen Debate on July 24, 1959, arguing the merits of capitalism vs. socialism, with Khrushchev saying Americans could not afford the luxury represented by the "Typical American House." The Soviet state news agency Tass buttressed Khrushchev's opinion, writing:

There is no more truth in showing this as the typical home of the American worker than, say, in showing the Taj Mahal as the typical home of a Bombay textile worker.

=== Ideological ===
The exhibition was a form of cultural diplomacy against Soviet Communism and had a "huge propaganda effect". The American politicians wanted to demonstrate the advantages of capitalism to the Soviets. This is evident in Vice President Richard Nixon's speech on the opening night of the Exhibition on July 24, 1959, as he congratulated USSR's Premier Nikita Khrushchev and the Soviets on their advances in astronomy and rocket science, but quickly returned to focus on what he considered the United States' strong points, especially the concept of freedom.

== Art controversies ==
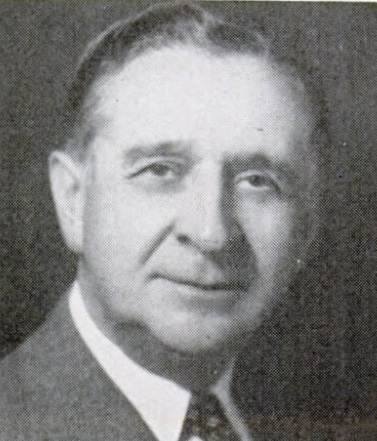
By 1949, Michigan Representative George Dondero was already denouncing NCASF as communist.

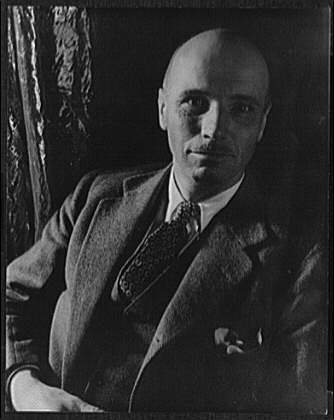
In 1957, Rockwell Kent had the first American solo exhibition in the Soviet Union.

In 1959, Francis E. Walter, the HUAC Chair, found links between half the artists and communism.

=== The National Council of American Soviet Friendship ===
The National American Exhibition was not the first American attempt at using the visual arts for cultural diplomacy. In 1943, an outgrowth of the "Soviet friendship societies established in the US during the 1920s and 1930s,"inspired many American artists and intellectuals to travel on cultural exchanges at government expense. That led to the development of the National Council of American Soviet Friendship, which emphasized both visual arts and partnerships with American museums, and found an enthusiastic audience of American artists. Many of them had been employed by the Federal Art Project where they had also worked in the social realist tradition. That history echoed the Soviets' state funding and penchant for heroic imagery.

=== The rise of nonrepresentational art ===
By 1949, however, "artists associated with the group were targeted by antimodernist campaigns led by U.S. Representative George A. Dondero ... who denounced the NCASF as “Communist and subversive,” and characterized socially engaged artists as “soldiers of the revolution—in smocks.” These opinions later won him the International Fine Arts Council's Gold Medal of Honor for "dedicated service to American Art." Meanwhile, an art establishment that had been supportive of American social realism began to back away from anything resembling political engagement, and began "favor[ing] nonrepresentational work that they viewed as apolitical and individualistic."

=== The first American artist ===
Sen. Joseph R. McCarthy, photographed in 1954, asked Rockwell Kent whether he was a communist. HUAC later investigated the other 67 artists invited to exhibit their work in the American National Exhibition.

Relations between the U.S. and the U.S.S.R. began to thaw again in the 1950s, even while red-baiting continued to dominate the American discourse. In 1953, the artist Rockwell Kent, a former member of the Socialist Party of America and a one-time Congressional candidate for the American Labor Party, was questioned by Joseph R. McCarthy. He and William Gropper were the only two visual artists ever called before the Senate Permanent Subcommittee of Investigations on Government Operations. Like Gropper, Kent refused to confirm or deny his political status on Fifth Amendment grounds.

In 1957, Kent became NCASF chairman, as well as "the first postwar American artist to be granted a solo exhibition in the Soviet Union." The Soviets promoted him, even while many American government officials remained suspicious: "The opening reception at the Pushkin Museum on December 12 was attended by prominent figures from the Moscow art community and representatives of the U.S. Embassy," but Kent was not given a passport to attend the opening. Yet the American show in the U.S.S.R. attracted attention, traveling first to the State Hermitage Museum ... before continuing on to ... Kiev, Riga, and Odessa, attracting a reported half-million visitors.

=== A plurality of American artists ===
Two years later, the U.S. State Department's Advisory Committee on the Arts and the U.S. Information Agency's (USIA) Advisory Committee on Cultural Information, which co-managed the American National Exhibition, launched an art show of their own, in many ways reminiscent of Kent's. Although art historians tend to focus on the abstract artists included in the show, the show's jury "made a concerted effort to emphasize the plurality of U.S. art," to illustrate a diversity of expression as a benefit of American democracy. Thus, the exhibits included American Scene paintings by [Thomas Hart] Benton, John Steuart Curry, Edward Hopper, and Grant Wood; expressionism and early experiments with abstraction by [Yasuo] Kuniyoshi, [Max] Weber, and Stuart Davis; and mature abstraction by Alexander Calder, Jackson Pollock, and Mark Rothko....^{"} Like Kent, however, the artists invited to appear in the Exhibition were linked to communist activities, and "a few right-wing publicists and legislators" accused them of "undermining the reputation of the United States."

=== Eisenhower appeases HUAC ===
After the entire group of painters and sculptors were investigated, Francis Walter, Chairman of the House Committee on Un-American Activities (HUAC), revealed that thirty-four of the sixty-seven featured artists had been involved in some Communist organization. The committee was prepared to remove their work from the Exhibit altogether when President Eisenhower intervened and allowed them to be displayed as originally planned. To appease the conservatives, however, he also added several paintings dating back to the eighteenth century, to further lessen the impact of the more avant-garde work.

== Legacy ==
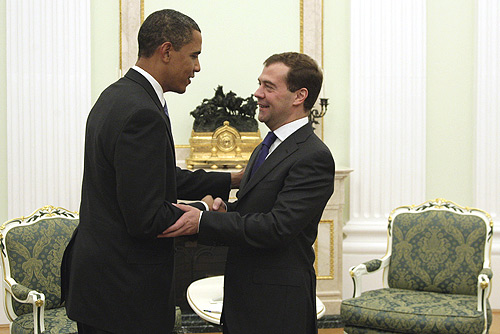
Then-U.S. president Barack Obama met with then-Russian president Dmitry Medvedev on July 7, 2009, during the 50th Anniversary of the American National Exhibition.

The American National Exhibition became the first of a series of traveling exhibitions from the U.S. Embassy in Moscow that continued for the next five decades to the early 1990s. In total, there were 87 separate showings of 19 exhibitions in 25 different cities, across 12 time zones, exhibiting American technology, from graphic arts to agriculture, outdoor recreation to medicine. The 50th anniversary conference of the National American Exhibition was celebrated "a day after U.S. President Barack Obama was in Russia to try to kick-start relations. With ties between Washington and Moscow at Cold War lows again, there was heavy nostalgia for the heady days of detente."
