= Stanley H. Klein =

American architect (1908–1992)

- Born: October 15, 1908; New York City, New York
- Died: April 12, 1992 (aged 83); New Hyde Park, New York
- Education: Cooper Union, New York University
- Occupation: Architect
- Spouse: Audrey Klein
- Children: 3

Stanley H. Klein (October 15, 1908 – April 12, 1992) was a noted American architect based in New York City.

== Biography ==
=== Life and career ===
The son of Jewish immigrants from Hungary, Ferdinand and Regina Neudorfer, Klein was a graduate of the Cooper Union for the Advancement of Science and Art and of New York University.

Among his most well-known designs was the single family, six room house shown at the 1959 American National Exhibition in Moscow, where Richard Nixon and Soviet leader Nikita S. Khrushchev held their televised "Great Kitchen Debate." Designed to help the Soviet people get the feel of "an average American home," the house was similar to hundreds of homes he designed on Long Island and the New York metropolitan area.

Larger Klein homes built in Jamaica, Queens, in New York City, and elsewhere featured a symmetrical colonial style; many of these larger brick homes still exist throughout Jamaica Estates and the rest of Queens.

In the 1950s and 1960s, Klein designed thousands of houses for The Birchwood Organization – a major development firm that created several Long Island housing developments, including a 2,600-home development in Jericho, New York.

In the 1960s, Klein also designed several homes in Flower Hill, New York. These homes, built on the site of Jesse Ricks' Chanticlare estate, were constructed as part of the Chanticlare at Flower Hill development.

Klein also designed the Hillcrest Jewish Center, Temple Beth Sholom, and the Queensboro Jewish Center – all three of which are in Queens – in addition to the Pine Hollow Country Club, in East Norwich, New York.

=== Death ===
Klein died on April 12, 1992, at Long Island Jewish Hospital in New Hyde Park, New York.

== Personal life ==
Klein was married for 50 years to his wife, Audrey. Together, they had three children: Michael F. Klein, Roberta Klein, and David Klein.

== See also ==
- Abraham Salkowitz
- Siegmund Spiegel
