= HMS Culloden (1776) =

Ship of the line of the Royal Navy

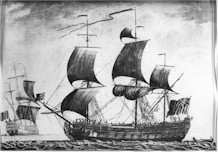
- Engraving of HMS Culloden

History

Great Britain
- Name: Culloden
- Ordered: 30 November 1769
- Builder: Deptford Dockyard
- Laid down: July 1770
- Launched: 18 May 1776
- Fate: Ran aground 23 January 1781 on Culloden Point, Montauk, New York and destroyed to avoid falling into the hands of the enemy.
- Notes: Participated in: Battle of Cape St Vincent

General characteristics
- Class & type: Culloden-class ship of the line
- Tons burthen: 1659 (bm)
- Length: 170 ft (52 m) (gundeck)
- Beam: 47 ft 2 in (14.38 m)
- Depth of hold: 19 ft 11 in (6.07 m)
- Propulsion: Sails
- Sail plan: Full-rigged ship
- Complement: 650 officers and men
- Armament: 74 guns: Gundeck: 28 × 32 pdrs; Upper gundeck: 28 × 18 pdrs; Quarterdeck: 14 × 9 pdrs; Forecastle: 4 × 9 pdrs
- H.M.S. Culloden Shipwreck Site
- U.S. National Register of Historic Places
- Nearest city: Montauk, New York
- Coordinates: 41°4′20.5″N 71°57′38.3″W
- NRHP reference No.: 79003795
- Added to NRHP: 5 March 1979

HMS Culloden was a 74-gun third-rate ship of the line of the Royal Navy, built at Deptford Dockyard, England, and launched on 18 May 1776. She was the fourth warship to be named after the Battle of Culloden, which took place in Scotland in 1746 and saw the defeat of the Jacobite rising.

She served with the Channel Fleet during the American War of Independence. May, 1778 under command of Capt. George Balfour. She saw action at the Battle of Cape St Vincent, before being sent out to the West Indies. Her stay there was brief, sailing for New York City with Admiral Rodney in August 1780 to join the North American station. The ship's specific duties were to blockade the French at Newport, Rhode Island where a French army of 6,000 had disembarked in July 1780.

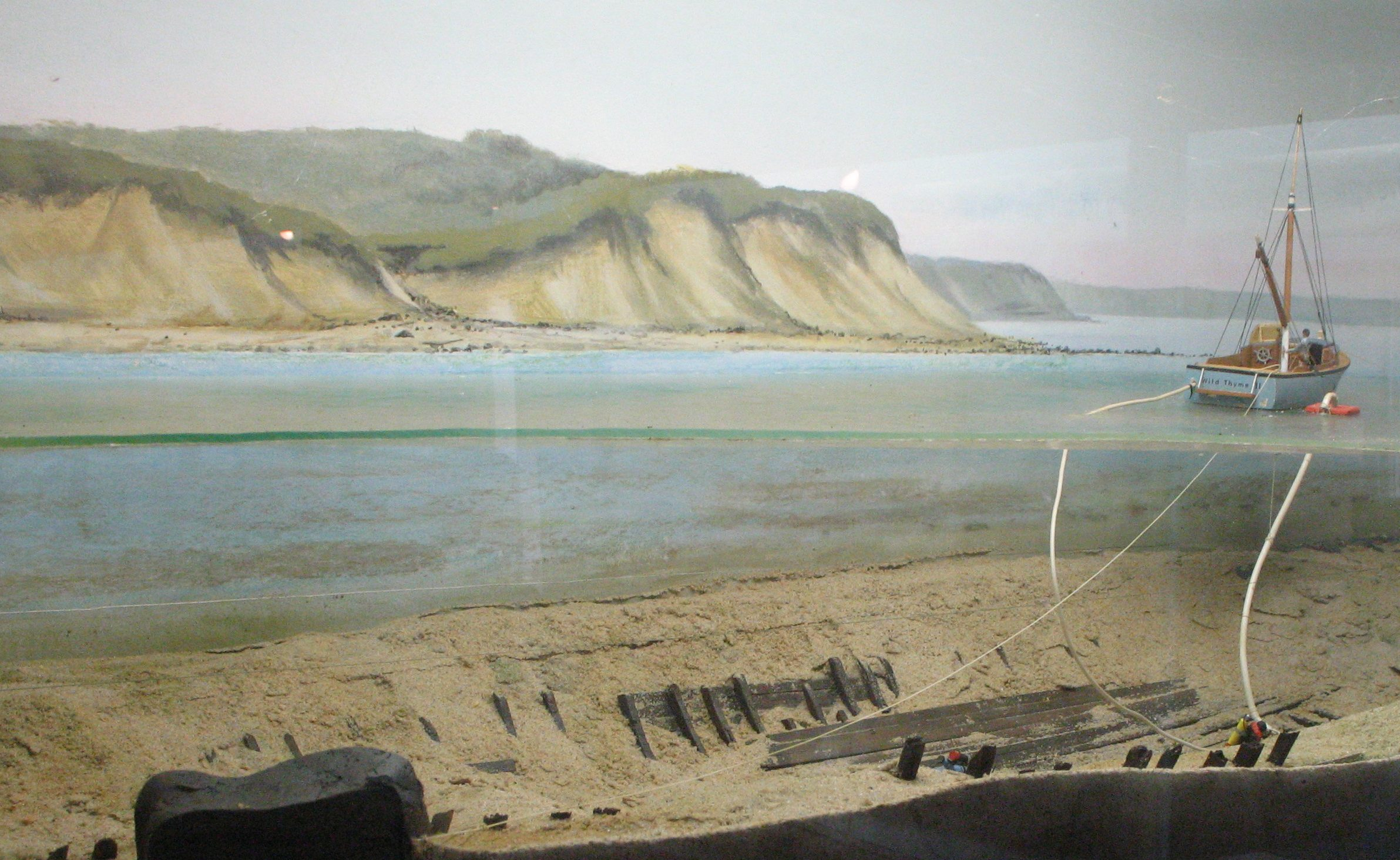
Diorama of Culloden wreck at the Marine Museum

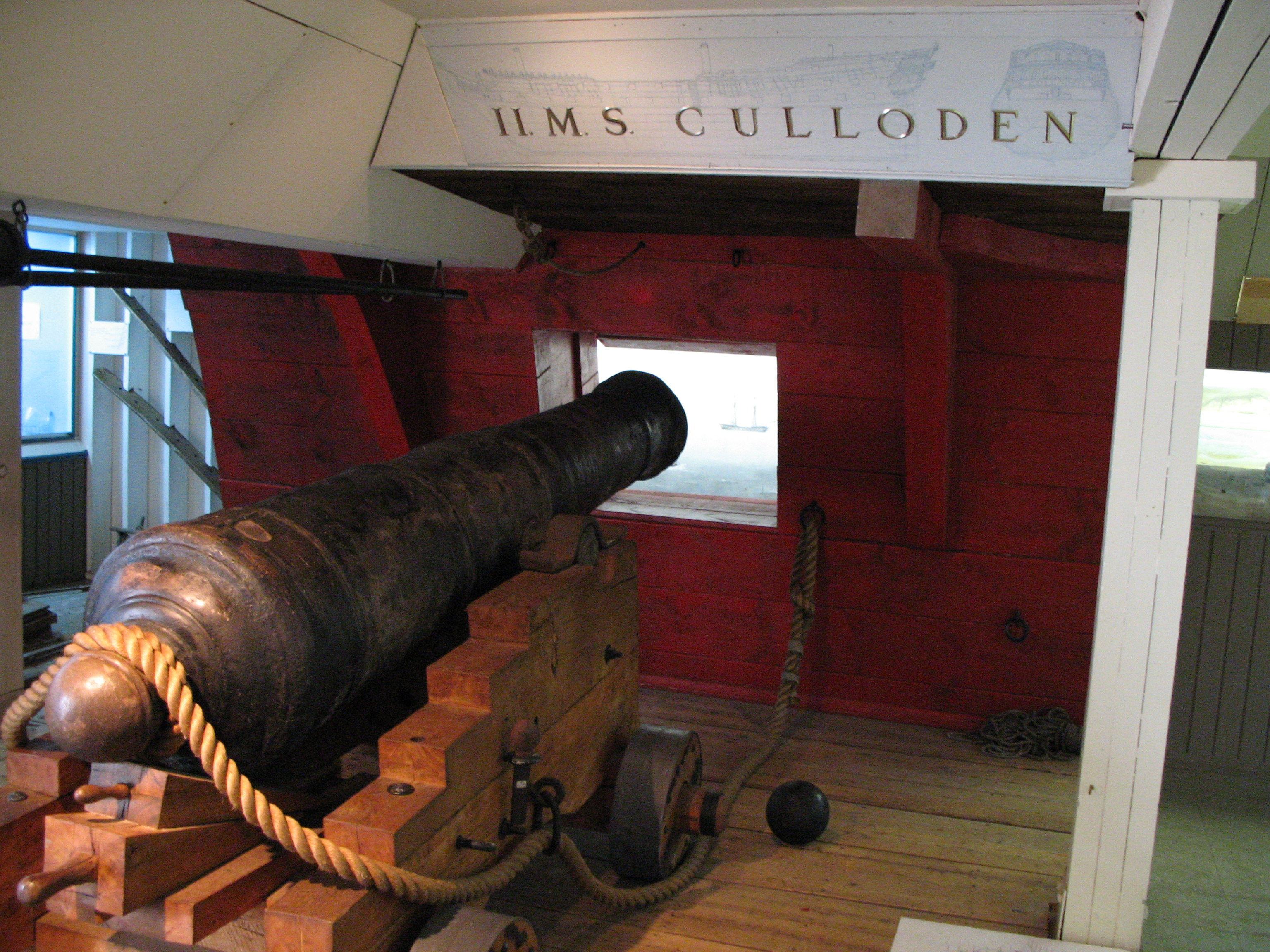
Cannon retrieved from Culloden on display at the East Hampton Marine Museum in Amagansett, New York

On 23 January 1781, while trying to intercept French ships attempting to run the blockade at Newport, Rhode Island, Culloden encountered severe weather and ran aground at North Neck Point (Will's Point) in Montauk. All attempts to refloat the vessel were unsuccessful, but all the crew were saved, and Culloden's masts were taken aboard HMS Bedford. The area is today known as Culloden Point.

== Salvage operations ==
The British conducted salvage operations on the ship throughout March, retrieving all 28 eighteen-pounder guns from the upper deck, and all 18 nine-pounders from the quarterdeck. The larger cannons were pushed into the sea and the ship was then burned to the waterline and abandoned.

On 24 July 1781, Joseph Woodbridge of Groton, Connecticut sent a letter to George Washington offering to sell him sixteen 32-pounders from the wreck, and on 14 July 1815, Samuel Jeffers arrived in Newport, Rhode Island with 12 tons of pig iron and a 32-pounder from the wreck.

In 1971 Henry W. Moeller, an undersea archaeologist associated with Dowling College, discovered the keel and large wooden beams resting in between 10 ft (3.0 m) and 15 ft (4.6 m) of water 150 ft (46 m) off Culloden Point. A gudgeon imprinted with the name Culloden was recovered. Subsequent recovery efforts brought up another 32-pounder cannon as well as copper sheathing. A sketch of the outline of the ruins showed the ship resting on a large boulder.

== National Register of Historic Places ==
Since 1979 the wreck site has been listed on the National Register of Historic Places, which prohibits SCUBA divers from taking artifacts from, or otherwise disturbing the wreck. The designated area is a 'circle with a radius of approximately 200 feet (61 m) and a centre at the point formed by UTM coordinates 251370 4550810 19T.

The application notes that in addition to Revolutionary War connections, the shipwreck is important for showing the British state-of-the-art copper sheathing of the ship as well as the possibility that it may reveal problems about corruption in the British shipyards at the time. The application notes:

Finally, the Culloden shipwreck site may provide material insight into the political conditions existent in the British Admiralty during this period. James [1926:7-18] has written describing the strength and organization of the Royal Navy at the end of the Seven Years' War (1755–1762) and its subsequent dissipation between 1771 and 1778 through mismanagement and corruption under Lord Sandwich's control of the Admiralty. Construction of the Culloden occurred during the period that Admiralty corruption was at its height. Therefore, the Culloden may reflect in material terms corrupt practices plaguing England's shipyards at the time. Construction shortcuts and the manufacturing of parts that do not meet specifications have long characterized the defense industry of all nations. The Culloden shipwreck site may provide data illustrating this activity.
