= Kitchen Debate =

1959 series of exchanges between Nikita Khrushchev and Richard Nixon

- Part of the Cold War
- Vice President Richard Nixon delivering a speech.
- Date: July 24, 1959
- Location: Sokolniki Park, Moscow, Soviet Union
- Participants: Richard Nixon (Vice President of the United States); Nikita Khrushchev (First Secretary of the Communist Party of the Soviet Union); Leonid Brezhnev (Chairman of the Presidium of the Supreme Soviet)
- Outcome: Increased domestic popularity for Richard Nixon; Public ideological clash between capitalism and communism broadcast globally; Symbolic cooling of Cold War tensions through cultural exchange

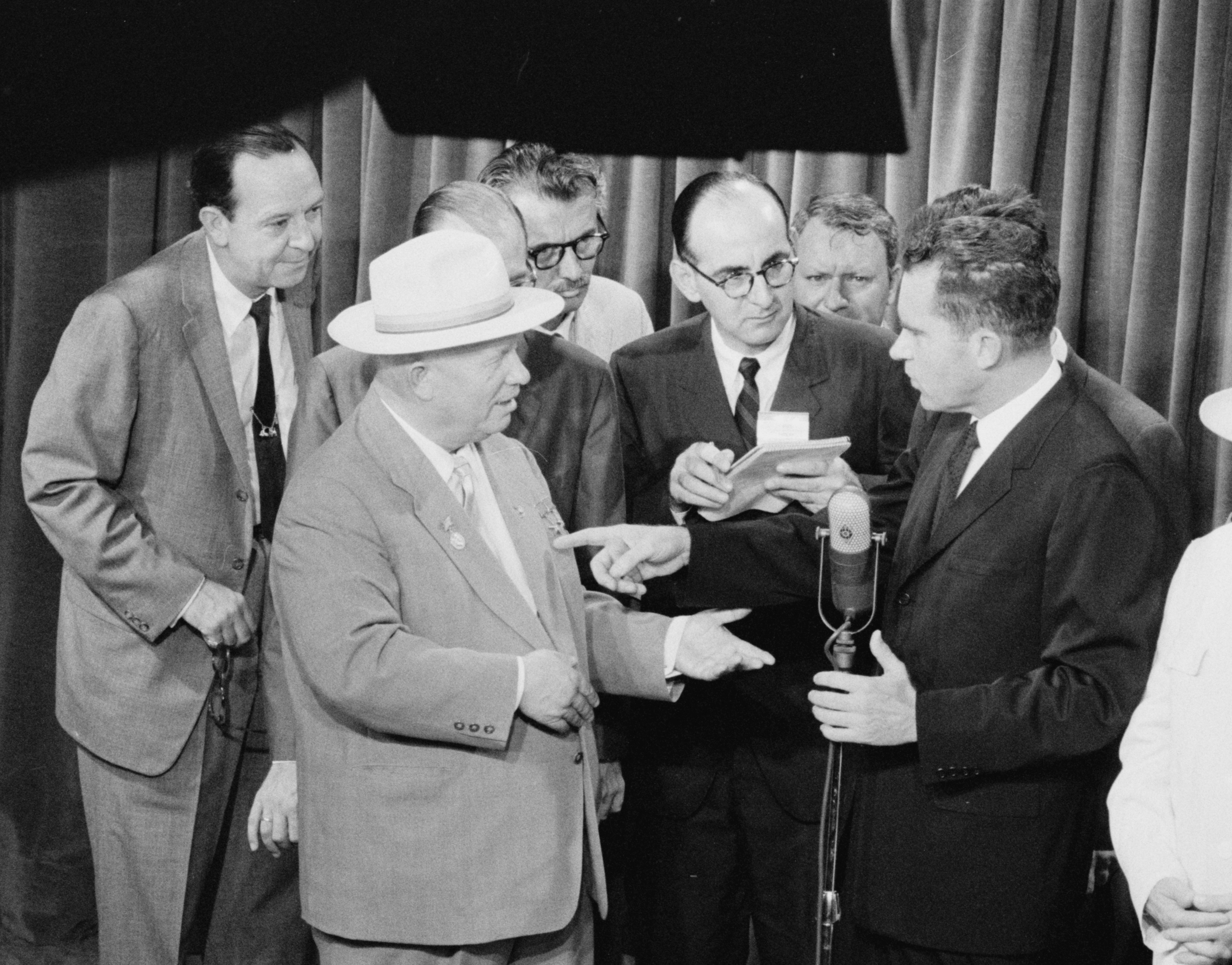
Soviet premier Nikita Khrushchev (left, foreground) and U.S. vice president Richard Nixon (right) debate the merits of communism versus capitalism in a model American kitchen at the American National Exhibition in Moscow (July 1959); photo by Thomas J. O'Halloran, Library of Congress collection

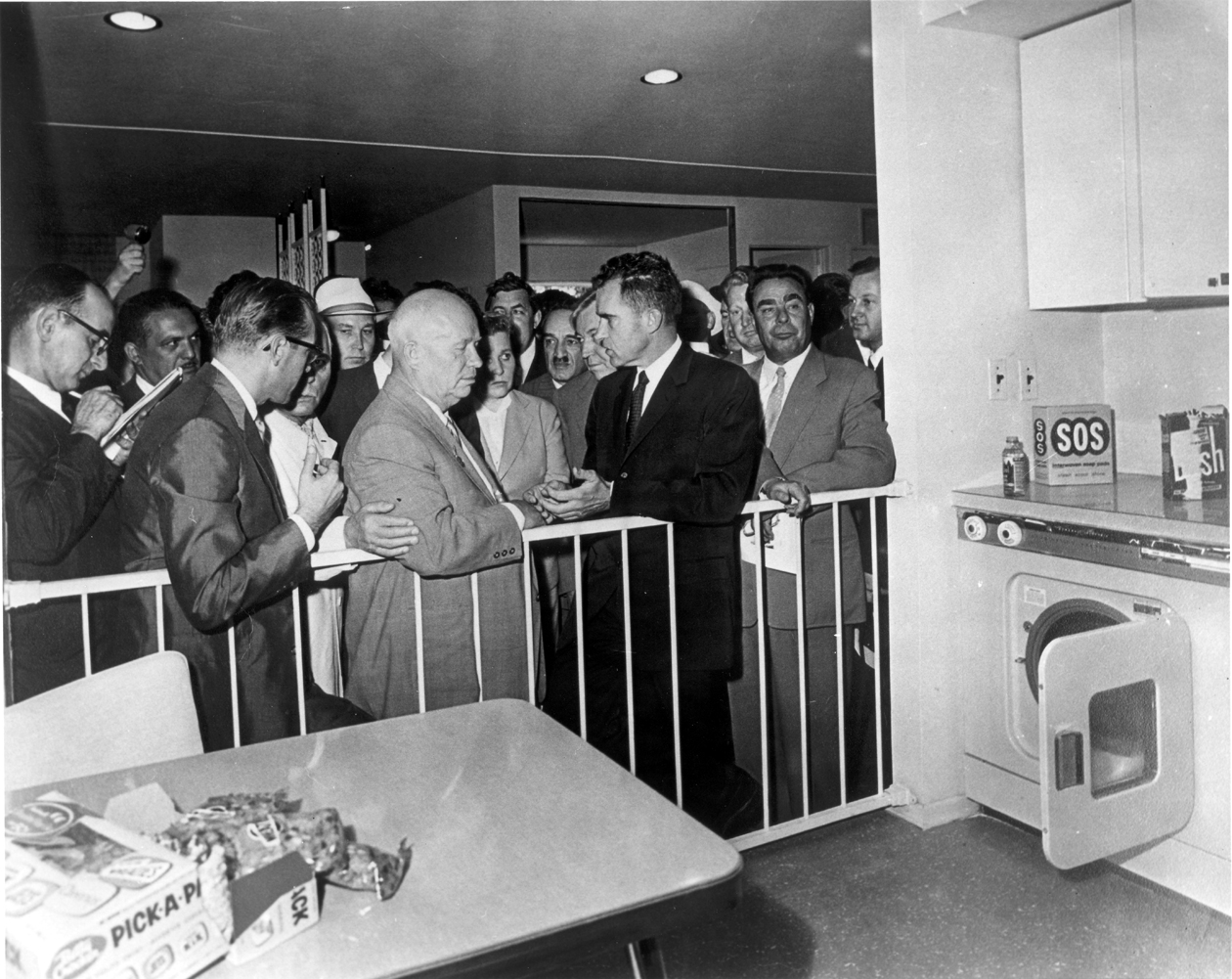
U.S. vice president Nixon spars with Khrushchev before reporters and onlookers, including Politburo members Leonid Brezhnev, Anastas Mikoyan and Yekaterina Furtseva at the American National Exhibition at Sokolniki Park, in Moscow, 1959

The Kitchen Debate (Russian: Кухонные дебаты, romanized: Kukhonnye debaty) was a series of impromptu exchanges through interpreters between U.S. vice president (later U.S. president) Richard Nixon and Soviet premier Nikita Khrushchev, at the opening of the American National Exhibition at Sokolniki Park in Moscow on July 24, 1959.

American exhibitors built an entire house for the exhibition, which they claimed anyone in the United States could afford. It was filled with labor-saving and recreational devices meant to represent the fruits of the capitalist American consumer market. The debate was recorded on color videotape, and Nixon made reference to this fact; it was subsequently broadcast in both countries.

== History ==
In 1959, the Soviet Union and United States agreed to hold exhibits in each other's countries as a cultural exchange to promote understanding. This was a result of the 1958 U.S.–Soviet Cultural Agreement. The Soviet exhibit in New York City opened in June 1959, and Vice President Nixon was on hand the following month to open the U.S. exhibit in Moscow. Nixon took Soviet First Secretary Nikita Khrushchev on a tour of the exhibit. There were multiple displays and consumer goods provided by more than 450 American companies. The centerpiece of the exhibit was a geodesic dome that housed scientific and technical experiments in a 30,000-square-foot (2,800 m^{2}) facility. The Soviets purchased the dome at the end of the Moscow exhibition.

William Safire was the exhibitor's press agent, and he recounted that the Kitchen Debate took place in a number of locations at the exhibition, but primarily in the kitchen of a suburban model house that was cut in half for easy viewing. Safire reported that Leonid Brezhnev was present and attempted to obstruct his photos. This was only one of a series of four meetings that occurred between Nixon and Khrushchev during the 1959 exhibition. Nixon was accompanied by President Eisenhower's younger brother Milton S. Eisenhower, then president of Johns Hopkins University.

Khrushchev surprised Nixon during the first meeting in the Kremlin when he protested the Captive Nations Resolution passed by the US Congress, which condemned the Soviet Union for its "control" over the "captive" peoples of Eastern Europe and called upon Americans to pray for those people. After protesting the actions of the U.S. Congress, he dismissed the new technology of the U.S. and declared that the Soviets would have all of the same things in a few years and then say "Bye bye" as they surpassed the U.S.

Khrushchev criticized the large range of American gadgets. In particular, Khrushchev saw that some of the gadgets were harder to use than the traditional way. One of these devices was a handheld lemon juicer for tea. He criticized the device, saying that it was much easier to squeeze the juice out by hand and the appliance was unnecessary. Khrushchev asked Nixon if this device was standard in American kitchens. Nixon admitted some of the products had not hit the U.S. market, and were prototypes. Khrushchev satirically asked "Don't you have a machine that puts food into the mouth and pushes it down?", a reference to Charlie Chaplin's 1936 film Modern Times. Nixon responded that at least the competition was technological rather than military. Both men agreed that the United States and the Soviet Union should seek areas of agreement.

The second visit occurred in a television studio inside the American exhibit. In the end, Khrushchev stated that everything that he had said in their debate should be translated into English and broadcast in the U.S. Nixon responded, "Certainly it will, and everything I say is to be translated into Russian and broadcast across the Soviet Union. That's a fair bargain." Khrushchev vigorously shook hands to this proposal.

Nixon argued that the Americans built to take advantage of new techniques, while Khrushchev advocated for Communism by arguing that the Soviets built for future generations. Khrushchev stated, "This is what America is capable of, and how long has she existed? 300 years? 150 years of independence and this is her level. We haven't quite reached 42 years, and in another 7 years, we'll be at the level of America, and after that we'll go farther."

The third visit occurred inside the kitchen on a cutaway model home that was furnished with a dishwasher, refrigerator, and range. It was designed to represent a $14,000 home that a typical American worker could afford (equivalent to $155,000 in 2025). Nixon's argument here rested on United States' appreciation for housewives; he stressed that offering women the opportunity to reside in a comfortable home, through having the appliances directly-installed, was an example of American superiority. Whilst pointing to the dishwasher, Nixon emphasized that such appliances would make life easier for women. Khrushchev replied, "Your capitalistic attitude toward women does not occur under Communism," to which Nixon fired back, "I think that this attitude towards women is universal. What we want to do, is make life more easy for our housewives."

== Television broadcast and global reaction ==
The three major American television networks broadcast the Kitchen Debate on July 25, 1959. The Soviets subsequently protested, as Nixon and Khrushchev had agreed that the debate should be broadcast simultaneously in America and the Soviet Union, with the Soviets threatening to withhold the tape until they were ready to broadcast. The American networks, however, had felt that the delay would cause the news to lose its immediacy. The debate was broadcast on Moscow television on July 27, albeit late at night and with Nixon's remarks only partially translated.

Soviet reaction revealed interest in the United States and its culture. Despite some Soviet propaganda, there was significant attendance to the US exhibition. Over the 42 days of the fair, more than 2.7 million ticketed visitors attended the exhibit, revealing their curiosity about the United States. Some visitors considered the kitchen too spacious with too many appliances, however, so there was not a massive cultural victory, but the exhibition did open their eyes to the US lifestyle. One Soviet visitor to the exhibition commented, "The 'Miracle kitchen' was brought here unnecessarily. We don't need it because we are striving to free our women from kitchen work entirely." Despite the attention, this was the only exhibition like this held in the Soviet Union during the Cold War, and one of the few introductions to American experiences, even if it was in a staged exhibition hall.

American reaction was mixed. The New York Times called it "an exchange that emphasized the gulf between east and west but had little bearing on the substantive issue" and portrayed it as a political stunt. The paper also declared that public opinion seemed divided after the debates. Time magazine, on the other hand, praised Nixon, saying that he "managed in a unique way to personify a national character proud of peaceful accomplishment, sure of its way of life, confident of its power under threat."

Nixon gained popularity because of the informal nature of the exchange, improving upon the lukewarm reception that he previously had with the American public. According to William Safire, he also impressed Khrushchev: "The shrewd Khrushchev came away from his personal duel of words with Nixon persuaded that the advocate of capitalism was not just tough-minded but strong-willed."

== Impact and legacy ==
The Kitchen Debate's impact is reflected through ongoing consumerism trends in the U.S. as well as globally. Nixon considered the convenience displayed through the choice in consumption a strength of capitalism over communism. The bright and exciting options were deemed as one of the benefits of capitalism as consumers were allowed a choice instead of having more limited options and less commodities to choose from. As historian Sarah A. Lichtman notes, "What was for sale [at the Kitchen Debate] was the American way of life, or rather, a version of how the American government wanted the world to see it." Historian Bess Williamson observes that "Today, former Soviet republics still struggle to balance economic stability with consumer choice, while we in the prosperous West have come to question the benefits of a household stuffed with gadgets."

The trip raised Nixon's profile as a public statesman, greatly improving his chances of receiving the Republican presidential nomination the following year. Khrushchev in a 1961 meeting with Nixon's opponent in the ensuing election, John F. Kennedy, would joke that he had voted for Kennedy.

In the Kitchen Debate, Khrushchev claimed that Nixon's grandchildren would live under communism and Nixon claimed that Khrushchev's grandchildren would live in freedom. In a 1992 interview, Nixon commented that at the time of the debate, he was sure Khrushchev's claim was wrong, but Nixon was not sure that his own assertion was correct. Nixon said that events had proven that he was indeed right because Khrushchev's grandchildren (Khrushchev's son Sergei Khrushchev was a naturalized American citizen) now lived in freedom, referring to then recent collapse of the Soviet Union.

== See also ==
- Six Crises
