= Wheeler–Schebler Carburetor Company =

American auto parts manufacturer

- Industry: Manufacturing
- Founded: 1902
- Founder: Frank H. Wheeler; George Schebler
- Defunct: 1912 (Evolving); 1987 (closed)
- Successor: Borg-Warner Corporation
- Headquarters: Indianapolis, Indiana, United States
- Products: Carburetor
- Owner: Frank H. Wheeler
- Wheeler–Schebler Carburetor Company Building
- U.S. National Register of Historic Places
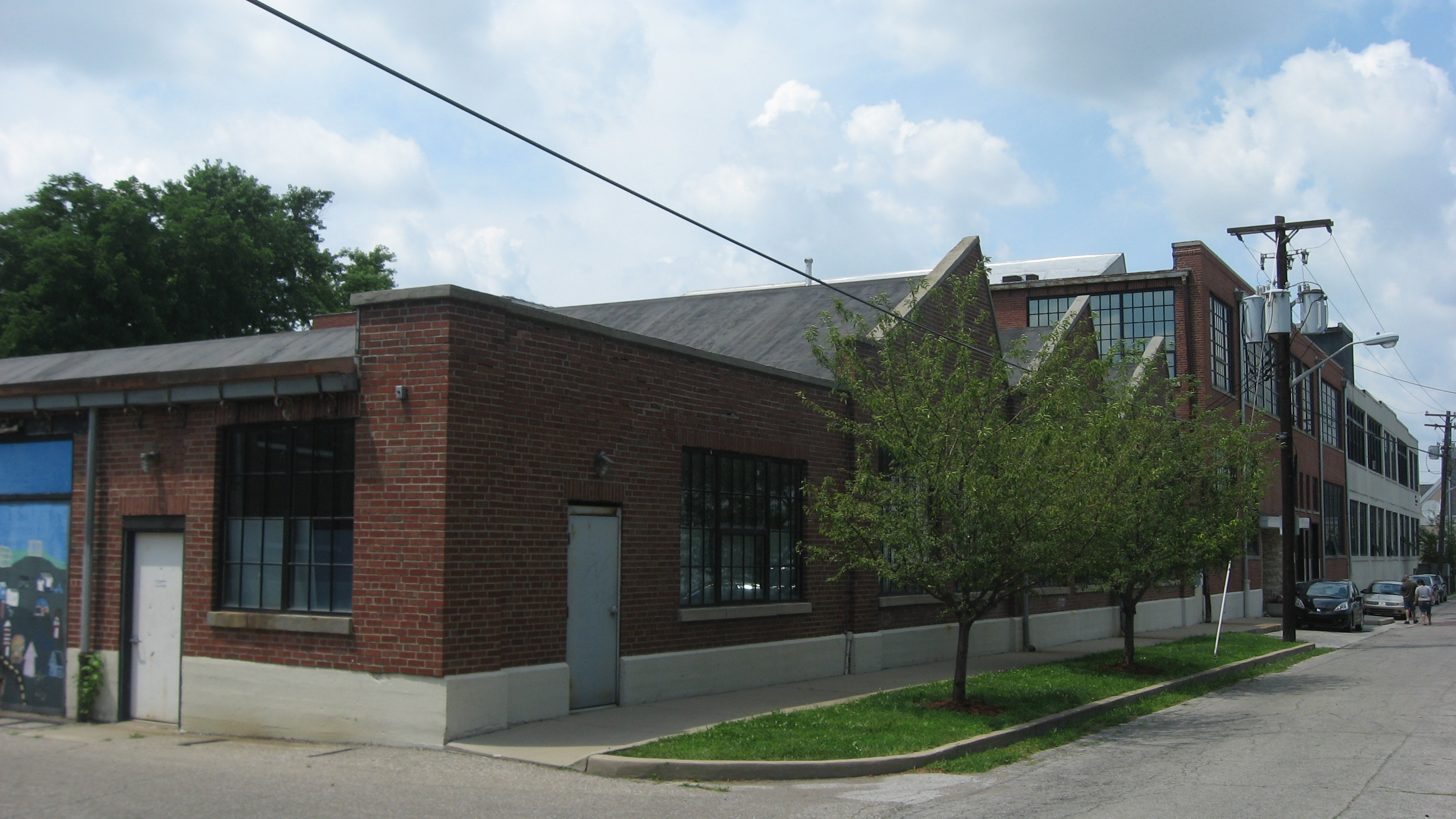

- Location within Indianapolis Location within Indiana Location within the United States
- Location: 1234 Barth Ave., Indianapolis, Indiana
- Coordinates: 39°45′0″N 86°8′28″W
- Area: 1.25 acres (0.51 ha)
- Built: 1911-12, 1919-20, 1928
- Architect: Bohlen & Sons; Herbert L. Bass
- NRHP reference No.: 04000210
- Added to NRHP: March 22, 2004

The Wheeler–Schebler Carburetor Company was an American manufacturer of automobile parts, based in Indianapolis, Indiana. It was the last automobile parts factory in Indianapolis to survive from the first decades of the 20th century. The company's original headquarters on Barth Avenue is known as the Wheeler–Schebler Carburetor Company Building. It was added to the National Register of Historic Places in 2004.

== History ==
In 1904, Harry C. Stutz, who was involved in the design and manufacture of internal combustion engines, introduced George Schebler to Frank H. Wheeler. In the resulting partnership, Wheeler provided the money, while Schebler contributed the engineering skills. Stutz worked temporarily as sales manager. By 1907, they were able to move to Indianapolis into a state-of-the-art factory, which produced carburetors for over 15 makes of autos from 1911 to 1951.

Frank Wheeler and three other local men opened the Indianapolis Motor Speedway in 1909. Prior to the inauguration of the Indianapolis 500 in 1911, the Wheeler-Schebler company sponsored the Wheeler-Schebler Trophy Race at the track. George Schebler sold his interests in the company in 1912, but it continued to operate under the Wheeler-Schebler name until 1928, when it evolved into the Marvel-Schebler Carburetor Company, one of five companies that played a role in the development of what became Borg-Warner Corporation.

The Marvel-Schebler company did some of the early work on fuel injection systems in the late 1950s and early 1960s, eventually merging with the Tillotson Carburetor Company in 1971. In 1985, the name was revised to "Control Systems" by the parent company, Borg-Warner. When Borg-Warner went through a leveraged buyout in 1987, Borg Warner Automotive Inc. was spun off as an independent company that is still in operation, developing fuel efficient engine and drive train technology. The trophy awarded annually to the winner of the Indianapolis 500 is still known as the Borg-Warner Trophy.

The original Wheeler-Schebler building is still standing in the Fountain Square district of Indianapolis, at 1035 East Sanders Street. It housed the Wheeler Arts Community and the Community Arts and Education Center until it was closed in 2018. The building is now being converted into housing units.

== See also ==
- National Register of Historic Places listings in Center Township, Marion County, Indiana
