= Arthur C. Newby =

American businessman (1865–1933)

- Born: Arthur Calvin Newby; December 29, 1865 near Monrovia, Indiana, U.S.
- Died: September 11, 1933 (aged 67); Indianapolis, Indiana, U.S.
- Resting place: Crown Hill Cemetery and Arboretum, Section 23, Lot 39, indianapolis, indiana 39.8180039°N 86.1725022°W
- Known for: Founding the Indianapolis Motor Speedway

Arthur Calvin Newby (December 29, 1865 – September 11, 1933) was an American businessman and pioneer of the bicycle and automotive industries in Indianapolis, Indiana. He was best known as one of the founders of the Indianapolis Motor Speedway.

== Early life ==
Newby was born near Monrovia, Indiana, but his family moved to Kansas City then California. Newby returned to Indiana in his late-teens and moved to Indianapolis. He took jobs working in stores around the city before he worked his way up to head bookkeeper at Nordyke Marmon & Company, a milling machinery manufacturer. One of the partners of this company, Daniel W. Marmon, later founded the Marmon Motor Car Company, whose Wasp vehicle was driven to victory by Ray Harroun at the inaugural running of the Indianapolis 500.

A keen cyclist, Newby helped to create the Zig-Zag Bicycling Club in the 1890s and remained its secretary for many years.

== Career ==
=== Indianapolis Stamping Company ===
Newby established the Indianapolis Chain and Stamping Company in December 1890 with partners Edward C. Fletcher and Glenn Howe to make Diamond bicycle chains and other bicycle components. They supplied about 60 percent of the nation's bicycle chains. They were joined by Charles E. Test. (Note: Wilbur and Orville Wright were agents for the chains at their bicycle shop in Dayton Ohio and seven chains were specially designed for their first successful aircraft which flew in 1903) After the end-of-the-century bicycle sales slump they sold the stamping company to American Bicycle Company in 1899. L. M. Wainwright and associates bought the business from American Bicycle and named it Diamond Chain Company. At the same time Arthur Newby was involved with Hay and Willits Manufacturing Company, which made Outing bicycles.

=== Newby Oval ===
His interest in cycling continued when in 1898 Newby commissioned architect Herbert Foltz to design a cycling track at the corners of 30th and North Meridian Streets in Indianapolis. The Newby Oval was completed in 1899. Its quarter-mile oval track became one of the fastest tracks in the country and brought out racers such as Eddie Bald, Tom Cooper, and Marshall "Major" Taylor to compete in front of crowds of over 8,000 spectators. The popularity of cycling began to wane after the turn of the 20th century, and by 1903 the track was dismantled and no longer in operation.

=== National Motor Vehicle Company ===
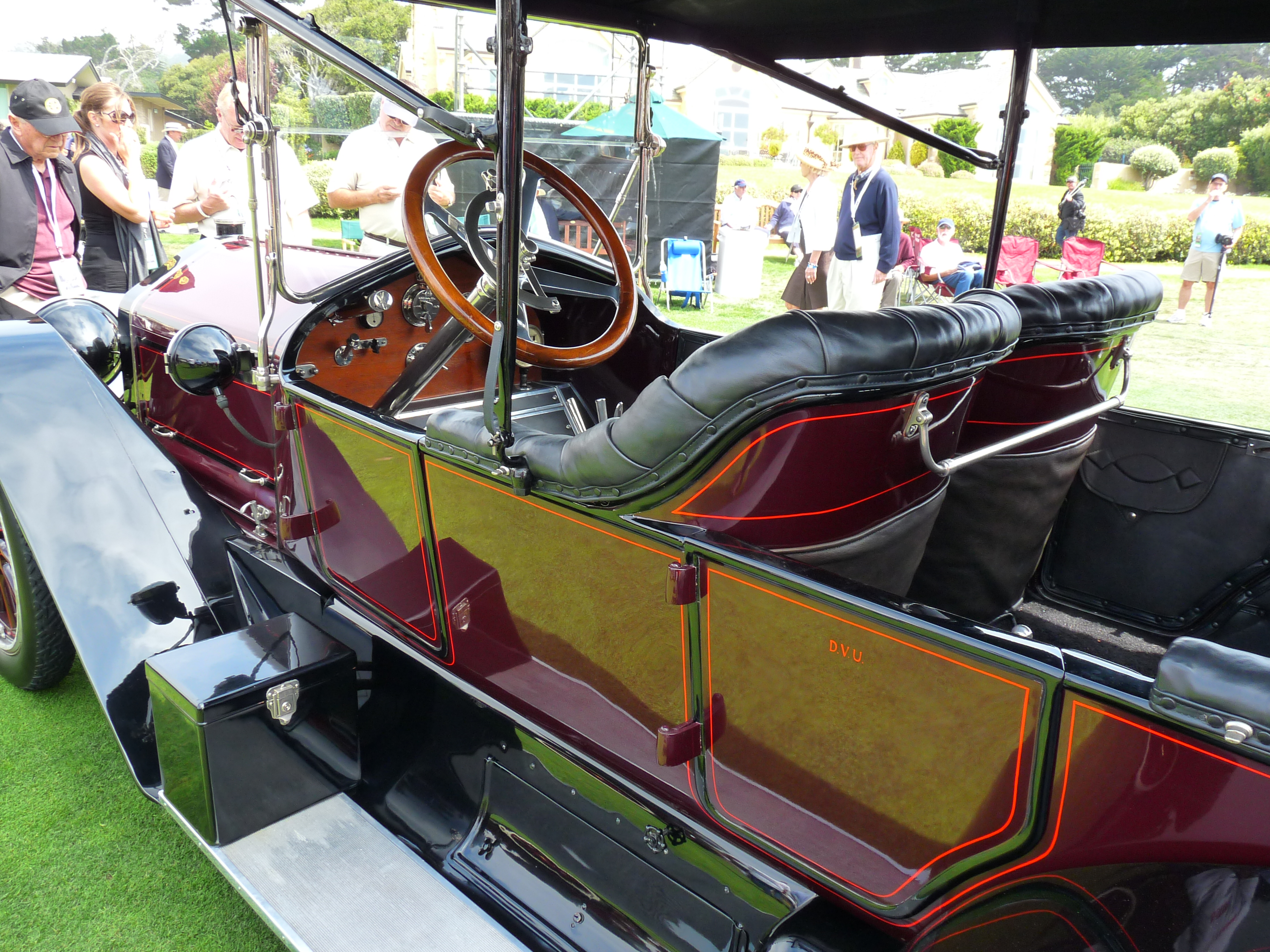
1913 National Toy Tonneau

With Charles Test and other investors, Newby founded the National Motor Vehicle Company in 1900. National began by producing electric runabout style vehicles before switching to radiator style vehicles in 1905. National began producing racing cars, and in 1912 a National car won the second running of the Indianapolis 500. Newby's involvement with National led to his partnership with old cycling friends, who went on to form the Empire Motor Car Company. His interests in National Automobile were sold to a New York corporation in 1916 and renamed National Motor Car and Vehicle Corporation.

=== Indianapolis Motor Speedway ===
In 1908, Newby was approached by Carl G. Fisher, with whom he founded the Empire Motor Car Company, to invest in a new motor speedway track. Fisher believed that Indianapolis was the best location for a racing track because of its numerous automobile manufacturers. Fisher found an acceptable parcel just west of Indianapolis and together with Newby, James A. Allison, and Frank H. Wheeler they purchased the land for $72,000. The group incorporated the Indianapolis Motor Speedway Company on March 20, 1909, with a capitalization of $250,000, with Fisher and James Allison each contributing $75,000 and Frank Wheeler and Arthur Newby on board for $50,000 each. In 1927, the founding group sold their interest in the Speedway to Eddie Rickenbacker. He was portrayed by local actor Matthew Allen for all the motor speedway centennial era events.

== Personal life ==
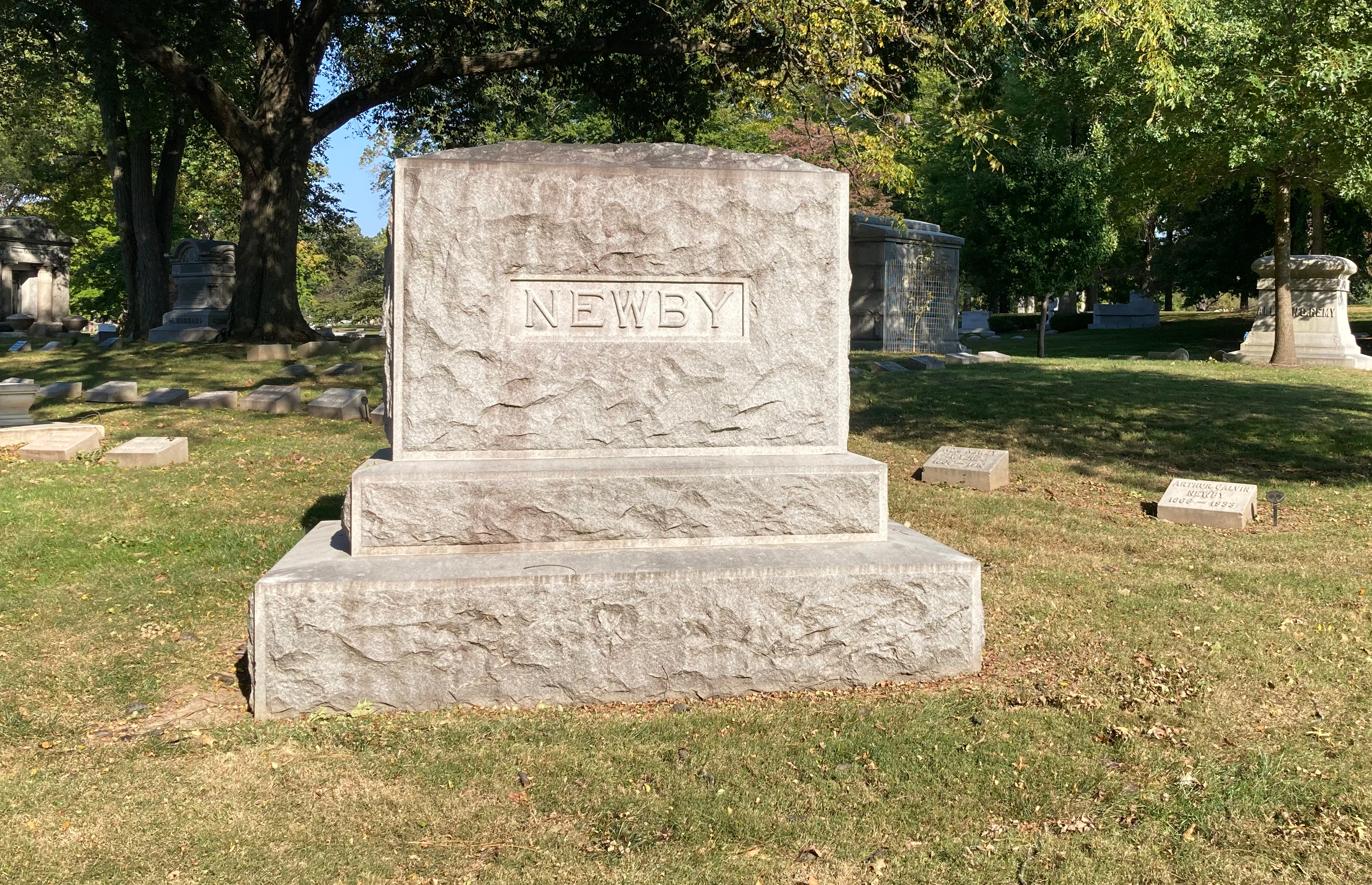
Newby's grave at Crown Hill Cemetery

Newby was a well-known philanthropist. He made large donations to Indianapolis area hospitals, in particular the James Whitcomb Riley Hospital for Children to establish an outpatient clinic and to the Robert Long Hospital to aid in its study of gastrointestinal diseases. He provided funds to assist with the move Butler University's campus to its current location. He also contributed to Earlham College. Newby's $10,000 contribution to Turkey Run State Park ensured its safety from business interests.

In retirement, he spent much of his time in Florida, where he was involved in projects with Carl Fisher and James Allison.

Arthur Newby died on September 11, 1933, at the age of 67. Newby never married and had no children. He is buried in Crown Hill Cemetery in Indianapolis.
