= Frank H. Wheeler =

American industrialist (1864–1921)

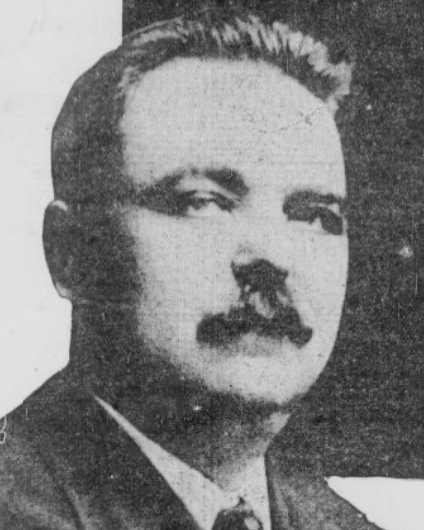
- Wheeler in a 1921 publication
- Born: October 24, 1864; Manchester, Iowa, US
- Died: May 27, 1921 (aged 56); Indiana, US
- Occupation: Industrialist

Frank H. Wheeler (October 24, 1864 – May 27, 1921) was an American industrialist.

== Biography ==
Wheeler was born on October 24, 1864, in Manchester, Iowa. He had reportedly made and lost two fortunes, later moving to Indianapolis from California in 1904. There, he was introduced to George Schebler by Harry C. Stutz. Together, they created the Wheeler–Schebler Carburetor Company. Wheeler operated the administrative side, and Schebler operated the manufacturing side. He went on to start Langenskamp-Wheeler Brass Works and the Stutz Fire Engine Company. He, Carl G. Fisher, Arthur C. Newby and James A. Allison were the original investors of the Indianapolis Motor Speedway. He committed suicide by gunshot on May 27, 1921, aged 56, in his Indiana home.
