= Indianapolis Motor Speedway =

Historic motorsport track in Speedway, Indiana, US

The "Brickyard" IMS

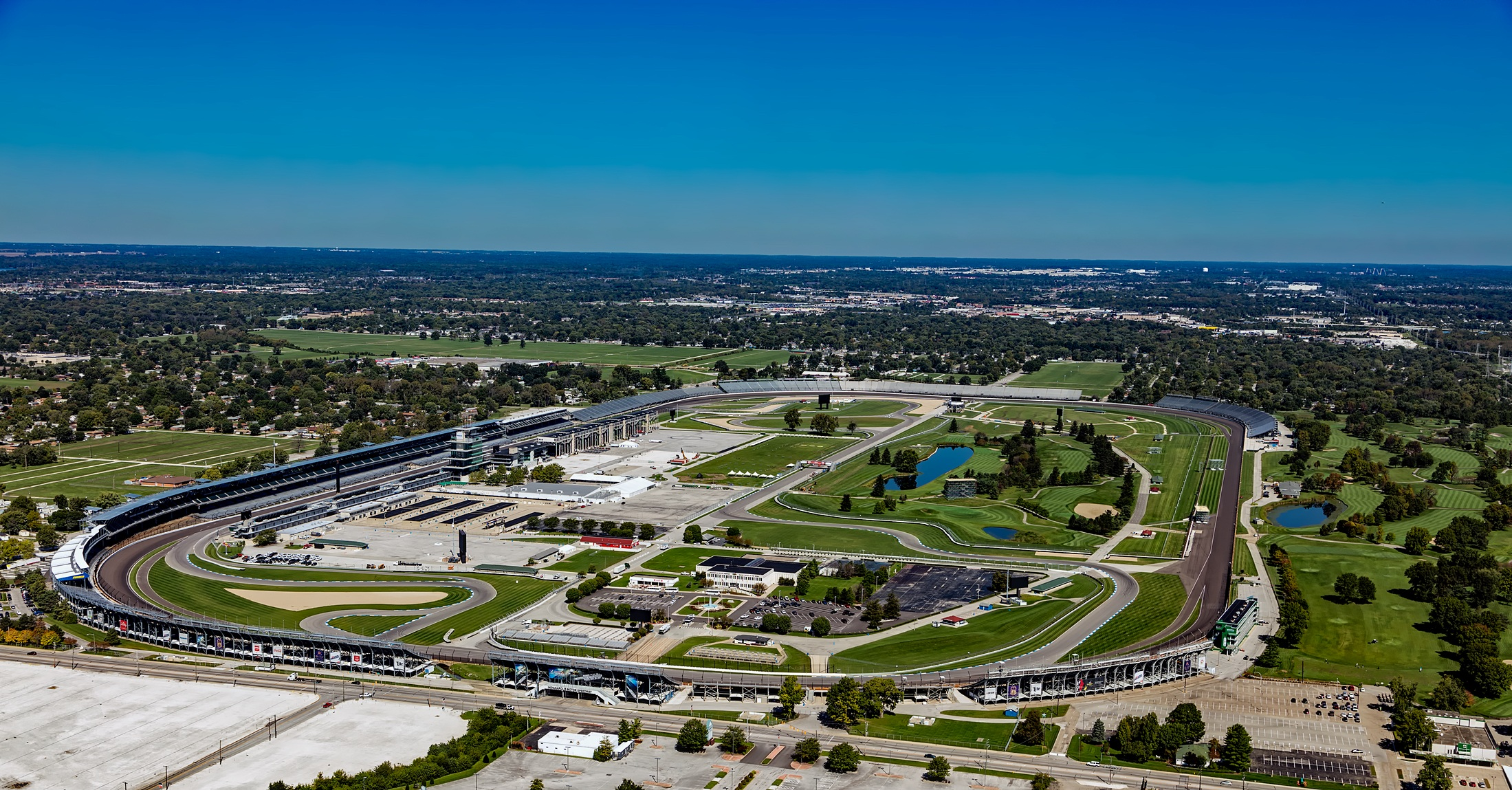
- Indianapolis Motor Speedway aerial in 2016
- Location: Speedway, Indiana
- Coordinates: 39°47′54″N 86°13′58″W
- Capacity: 257,325 (permanent seats) – 400,000 grand total
- FIA Grade: 1 (F1 road course layout) (currently inactive); 2 (Indycar road course layout)
- Owner: Penske Entertainment Group (2020–present); Hulman & Company (1945–2019); Eddie Rickenbacker (1927–1945); Carl G. Fisher (1909–1927)
- Operator: IMS, LLC (subsidiary of Penske Entertainment Group)
- Address: 4790 West 16th Street
- Broke ground: March 15, 1909; 117 years ago
- Opened: August 14, 1909; 117 years ago
- Construction cost: US$3 million ($86 million 2021 dollars)
- Architect: Carl G. Fisher, James A. Allison, Frank H. Wheeler, Arthur C. Newby
- Major events: Current: IndyCar Series Indianapolis 500 (1911–present); Sonsio Grand Prix (2014–present) Gallagher Grand Prix (2020–2023); Intercontinental GT Challenge Indianapolis 8 Hour (2020–2026); NASCAR Cup Series Brickyard 400 (1994–2020, 2024–present) Verizon 200 (2021–2023); NASCAR O'Reilly Auto Parts Series Pennzoil 250 (2012–2019, 2024–present) Pennzoil 150 (2020–2023); IMSA SportsCar Championship IMSA Battle on the Bricks (2014, 2023–present); Sportscar Vintage Racing Association Indy Legends Charity Pro–Am race (2014–2019, 2022–present); GT World Challenge America (2020–present); Lamborghini Super Trofeo North America (2023–present); Trans-Am Series (2017–2019, 2023, 2026); Future: Ferrari Challenge North America (2000–2002, 2019–2022, 2024–2025, 2027); Former: Formula One United States Grand Prix (2000–2007) Indianapolis 500 (1950–1960); Grand Prix motorcycle racing Indianapolis motorcycle Grand Prix (2008–2015); Rolex Sports Car Series Brickyard Grand Prix (2012–2013); SCCA National Championship Runoffs (2017, 2021); MotoAmerica (2015, 2020); International Race of Champions IROC at Indy (1998–2003)
- Website: http://www.indianapolismotorspeedway.com/

Rectangular Oval Track (1909–present)
- Surface: Asphalt and brick (start-finish line)
- Length: 2.500 mi (4.023 km)
- Turns: 4
- Banking: Turns: 9.2° Straights: 0°
- Race lap record: 0:38.119 ( (United States) Eddie Cheever, Lola T95/00, 1996, IndyCar)

Grand Prix Road Course (2014–present)
- Surface: Asphalt and brick (start-finish line)
- Length: 2.439 mi (3.925 km)
- Turns: 14
- Race lap record: 1:09.3888 ( (United States) Josef Newgarden, Dallara DW12, 2017, IndyCar)

Modified Motorcycle Course (2014–present)
- Surface: Asphalt and brick
- Length: 2.591 mi (4.170 km)
- Turns: 16
- Race lap record: 1:32.625 ( (Spain) Marc Márquez, Honda RC213V, 2015, MotoGP)

SCCA Runoffs Road Course (2014–present)
- Surface: Asphalt and brick (start-finish line)
- Length: 2.589 mi (4.166 km)
- Turns: 15
- Race lap record: 1:30.650 ( (United States) James French, Ralt RT41, 2021, Formula Atlantic)

Original Motorcycle Course (2008–2013)
- Surface: Asphalt and brick
- Length: 2.621 mi (4.218 km)
- Turns: 16
- Race lap record: 1:39.044 ( (Spain) Marc Márquez, Honda RC213V, 2013, MotoGP)

Grand Prix Road Course (2008–2013)
- Surface: Asphalt and brick (start-finish line)
- Length: 2.534 mi (4.078 km)
- Turns: 13
- Race lap record: 1:22.191 ( (United States) Scott Pruett, Riley MkXXVI, 2013, DP)

Grand Prix Road Course (2000–2007)
- Surface: Asphalt and brick (start-finish line)
- Length: 2.605 mi (4.192 km)
- Turns: 13
- Race lap record: 1:10.399 ( (Brazil) Rubens Barrichello, Ferrari F2004, 2004, F1)
- Indianapolis Motor Speedway
- U.S. National Register of Historic Places
- U.S. National Historic Landmark District
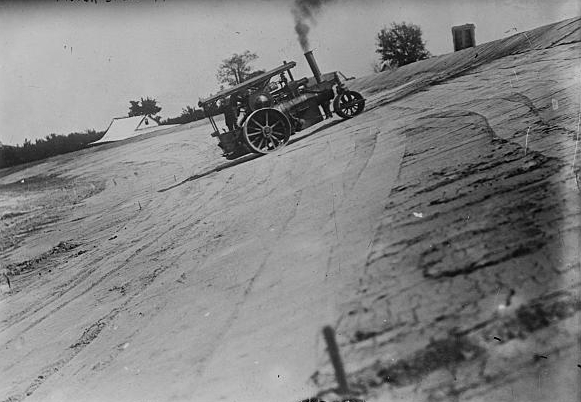
- The Indianapolis Motor Speedway under construction

- Location within Indianapolis Location within Indiana Location within the United States
- Location: 4790 W. 16th St., Speedway, Indiana
- Built: 1909
- Architects: Andrews, Park Taliaferro
- Architectural style: Motor racing circuit
- NRHP reference No.: 75000044

Significant dates
- Added to NRHP: March 7, 1975
- Designated NHLD: February 27, 1987

The Indianapolis Motor Speedway is a motor racing circuit located in Speedway, Indiana, United States, an enclave suburb of Indianapolis, Indiana. It is the home of the Indianapolis 500 and the Brickyard 400, and formerly the home of the United States Grand Prix and the Indianapolis motorcycle Grand Prix. It is located six miles (9.7 km) west of Downtown Indianapolis.

Constructed in 1909, it is the second purpose-built, banked oval racing circuit after Brooklands and the first to be called a 'speedway'. It was the brainchild of entrepreneur Carl G. Fisher, who envisioned a proving ground for the budding automobile industry. It is the third-oldest permanent automobile race track in the world, behind Brooklands and the Milwaukee Mile. With a permanent seating capacity of 257,325, it is the highest-capacity sports venue in the world.

The track is a 2.500 mi (4.023 km) rectangular oval with dimensions that have remained essentially unchanged since its construction. It has two 0.625 mi (1.006 km) straightaways, four geometrically identical 0.250 mi (0.402 km) turns, connected by two 0.125 mi (0.201 km) short straightaways, termed "short chutes", between turns 1 and 2, and between turns 3 and 4. The turns have 9°12' banking, considered relatively flat by American standards.

A modern, FIA Grade One infield road course was completed in 2000, incorporating part of the oval, including the main stretch and the southwest turn, measuring 2.605 mi (4.192 km). In 2008, and again in 2014, the road course layout was modified to accommodate motorcycle racing, as well as to improve competition. Altogether, the current grounds have expanded from an original 320 acres (1.3 km^{2}) on which the speedway was first built to cover an area of over 559 acres (2.3 km^{2}). Placed on the National Register of Historic Places in 1975 and designated a National Historic Landmark in 1987, it is the only such site to be affiliated with automotive racing history.

In addition to the Indianapolis 500, the speedway also hosts NASCAR's Brickyard 400 and Pennzoil 250. From 2000 to 2007, the speedway hosted the Formula One United States Grand Prix, and from 2008 to 2015 the Moto GP. The speedway served as the venue for the opening ceremonies for the 1987 Pan American Games.

On the grounds of the speedway is the Indianapolis Motor Speedway Museum, which opened in 1956, and houses the Hall of Fame. The museum moved into its current building located in the infield in 1976. Also on the grounds is the Brickyard Crossing Golf Resort, which originally opened as the Speedway Golf Course in 1929. The golf course has 14 holes outside the track, along the backstretch, and four holes in the infield. The site is among the most visited attractions in the Indianapolis metropolitan area, with 1 million guests annually. The track is nicknamed "The Brickyard", and the venue self-describes as the "Racing Capital of the World". The garage area is known as Gasoline Alley, though Indy 500 racecars have used methanol and currently ethanol.

The Speedway is owned by Penske Entertainment group which is 67% controlled by Roger Penske's company Penske Corporation, with Fox Corporation owing a 33% stake in the company since July 2025, following its 2019 purchase of Hulman & Company and its assets, which included the Speedway, the IndyCar Series, and associated enterprises. Carl G. Fisher, along with investors James A. Allison, Arthur C. Newby, and Frank H. Wheeler comprised the founding ownership group. World War I flying ace Eddie Rickenbacker was the track's second owner (1927–1945), and incidentally he also drove in the Indianapolis 500 four times. Tony Hulman purchased the track from Eddie Rickenbacker following World War II, and the Hulman/George family owned the track for three generations (1945–2019).

== History ==
=== Early history ===
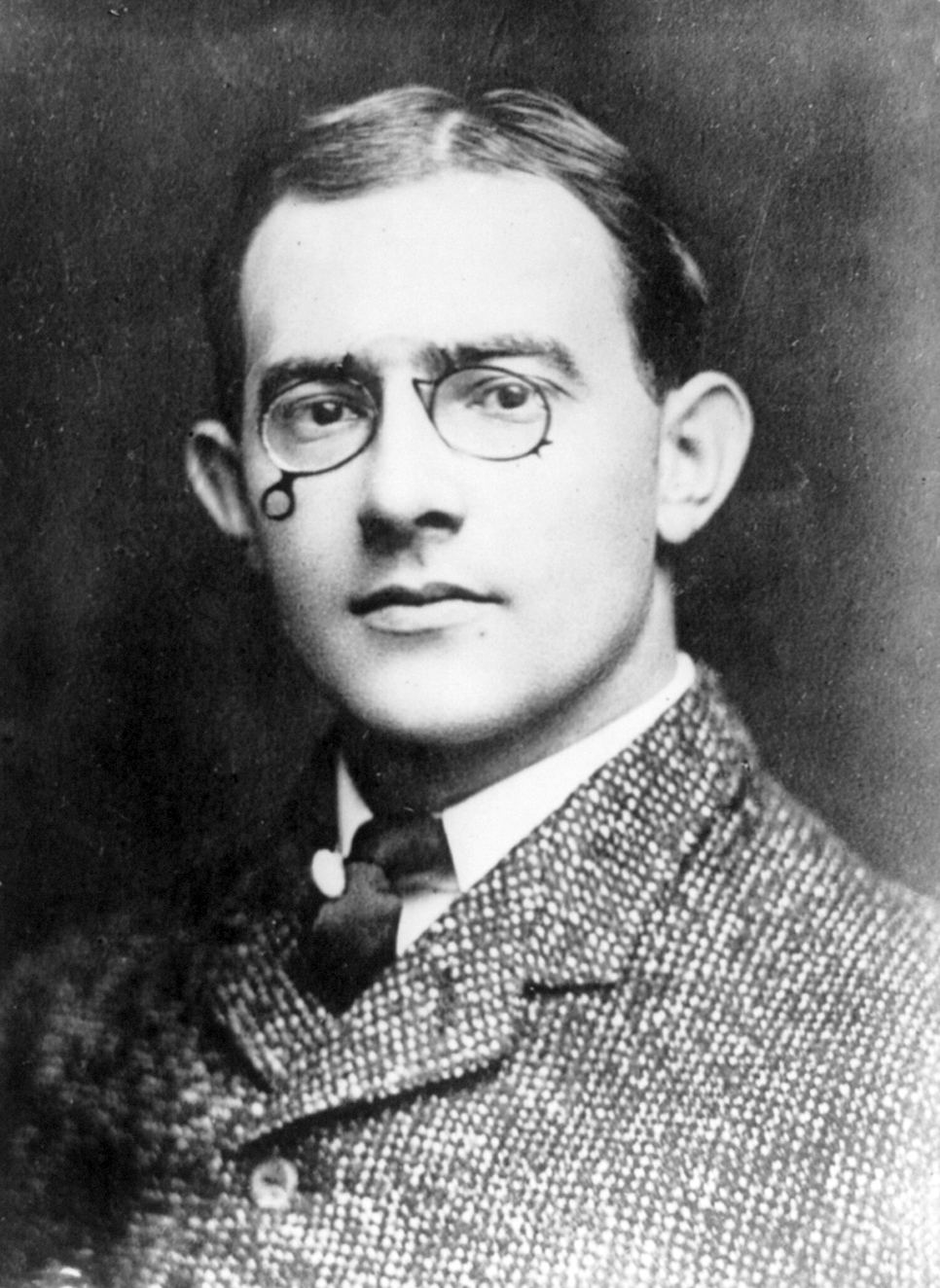
Carl Graham Fisher (1874–1938) of Greensburg, Indiana, an American vehicle parts and highway entrepreneur and the co-founder and first president of the Indianapolis Motor Speedway, May 1909

Indianapolis businessman Carl G. Fisher first envisioned building the speedway in 1905 after assisting friends racing in France and seeing that Europe held the upper hand in automobile design and craftsmanship. Fisher began thinking of a better means of testing cars before delivering them to consumers. At the time, racing was just getting started on horse tracks and public roads. Fisher noticed how dangerous and ill-suited the makeshift courses were for racing and testing. He also argued that spectators did not get their money's worth, as they were able to get only a brief glimpse of cars speeding down a linear road.

Fisher proposed building a circular track 3 to 5 miles (5 to 8 km) long with smooth 100–150-foot-wide (30–45 m) surfaces. Such a track would give manufacturers a chance to test cars at sustained speeds and give drivers a chance to learn their limits. Fisher predicted speeds could reach up to 120 mph (190 km/h) on a 5-mile (8 km) course. He visited the Brooklands circuit outside London in 1907, and after viewing the banked layout, it solidified his determination to build the speedway. With dozens of car makers and suppliers in Indiana, Fisher proclaimed, "Indianapolis is going to be the world's greatest center of horseless carriage manufacturing; what could be more logical than building the world's greatest racetrack right here?"

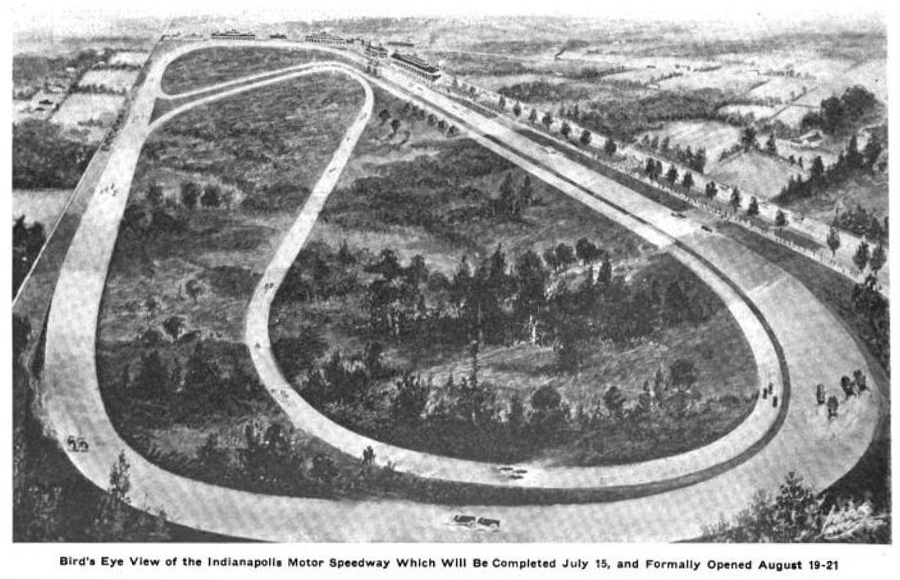
Artist's rendition of the original speedway plan (not a photograph)

Fisher began looking around the Indianapolis area for a site to build his track; he rejected two potential sites before finding level farmland, Pressley Farm, totaling 328 acres (133 ha) about 5 miles (8 km) outside Indianapolis. In December 1908, he convinced James A. Allison, Arthur C. Newby, and Frank H. Wheeler to join him in purchasing the property for $72,000. The group incorporated the Indianapolis Motor Speedway Company on March 20, 1909, with a capitalization of $250,000, with Fisher and James Allison in for $75,000 apiece and Frank Wheeler and Arthur Newby on board for $50,000 each.

Construction of the track started in March 1909. Fisher had to quickly downsize his planned 3 mi (5 km) oval with a 2 mi (3 km) road course to a 2.5-mile (4.0 km) oval to leave room for the grandstands. Reshaping of the land for the speedway took 500 laborers, 300 mules and a fleet of steam-powered machinery. The track surface consisted of graded and packed soil covered by 2 in (5 cm) of gravel, 2 in (5 cm) of limestone covered with taroid (a solution of tar and oil), 1–2 in (3–5 cm) of crushed stone chips that were also drenched with taroid, and a final topping of crushed stone. Workers also constructed dozens of buildings, several bridges, grandstands with 12,000 seats, and an 8 ft (2.4 m) perimeter fence. A white-with-green-trim paint scheme was used throughout the property.

The first event ever held at the speedway was a helium gas-filled balloon competition on Saturday, June 5, 1909, more than two months before the oval was completed. The event drew a reported 40,000 people. Nine balloons lifted off "racing" for trophies; a balloon by the name of Universal City won the race, landing 382 mi (615 km) away in Alabama after spending more than a day aloft. The first motorsport event at the track consisted of seven motorcycle races, sanctioned by the Federation of American Motorcyclists (FAM), on August 14, 1909. This was originally planned as a two-day, 15-race program, but ended before the first day was completed due to concerns over suitability of the track surface for motorcycle use. These early events were largely planned by one of the top names in early auto racing promotion, Ernest Moross, who earned fame for his bold and sometimes outlandish barnstorming events at fairgrounds tracks with racing star Barney Oldfield.

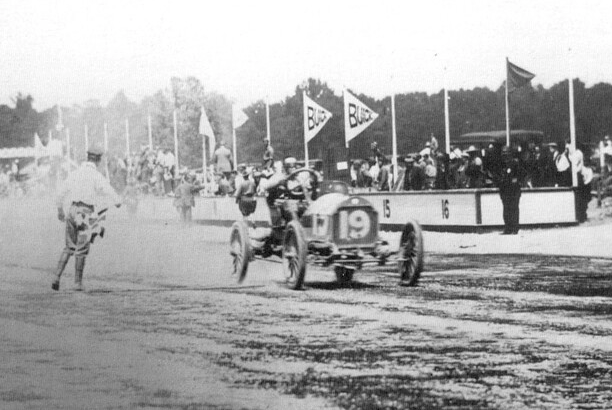
Louis Schwitzer won the first auto race held at the Speedway, a 5-mile, two lap event held on August 19, 1909

On August 19, 1909, fifteen carmakers' teams arrived at the track for practice. The track surface again became a concern with drivers being covered in dirt, oil, and tar and with ruts and chuckholes beginning to form in the turns. Speedway workers oiled and rolled the track prior to the gates opening to the public. Fifteen to twenty thousand spectators showed up, paying at the most $1 for a ticket. Louis Schwitzer won the first race held, a 5-mile, two lap event. Halfway through the first 250 mi (400 km) event, race leader Louis Chevrolet was temporarily blinded when a stone smashed his goggles. William Bourque, driving in a Knox, suffered a suspected rear-axle failure resulting in his car flipping end over end on the front stretch before crashing into a fence post. Both he and his mechanic, Harry Halcomb, died at the scene.

The first day of car racing resulted in four finishes and two land speed records, but concerns over safety led AAA officials to consider canceling the remaining events. Fisher promised the track would be repaired by the next day and convinced officials that the show should go on. The second day saw 20,000 spectators, no major incidents, and additional speed records broken.

On the third day of racing, 35,000 spectators showed up to watch the grand finale 300 mi (480 km) race. At 175 mi (282 km) into the race, the right front tire blew on Charlie Merz's car. His car mowed down five fence posts and toppled dozens of spectators. Two spectators and his mechanic, Claude Kellum, were killed in the crash. Ten laps later, driver Bruce Keen struck a pothole and crashed into a bridge support. The race was then halted and the remaining drivers were given engraved certificates instead of trophies. The race resulted in the AAA boycotting any future events at the speedway until significant improvements were made.

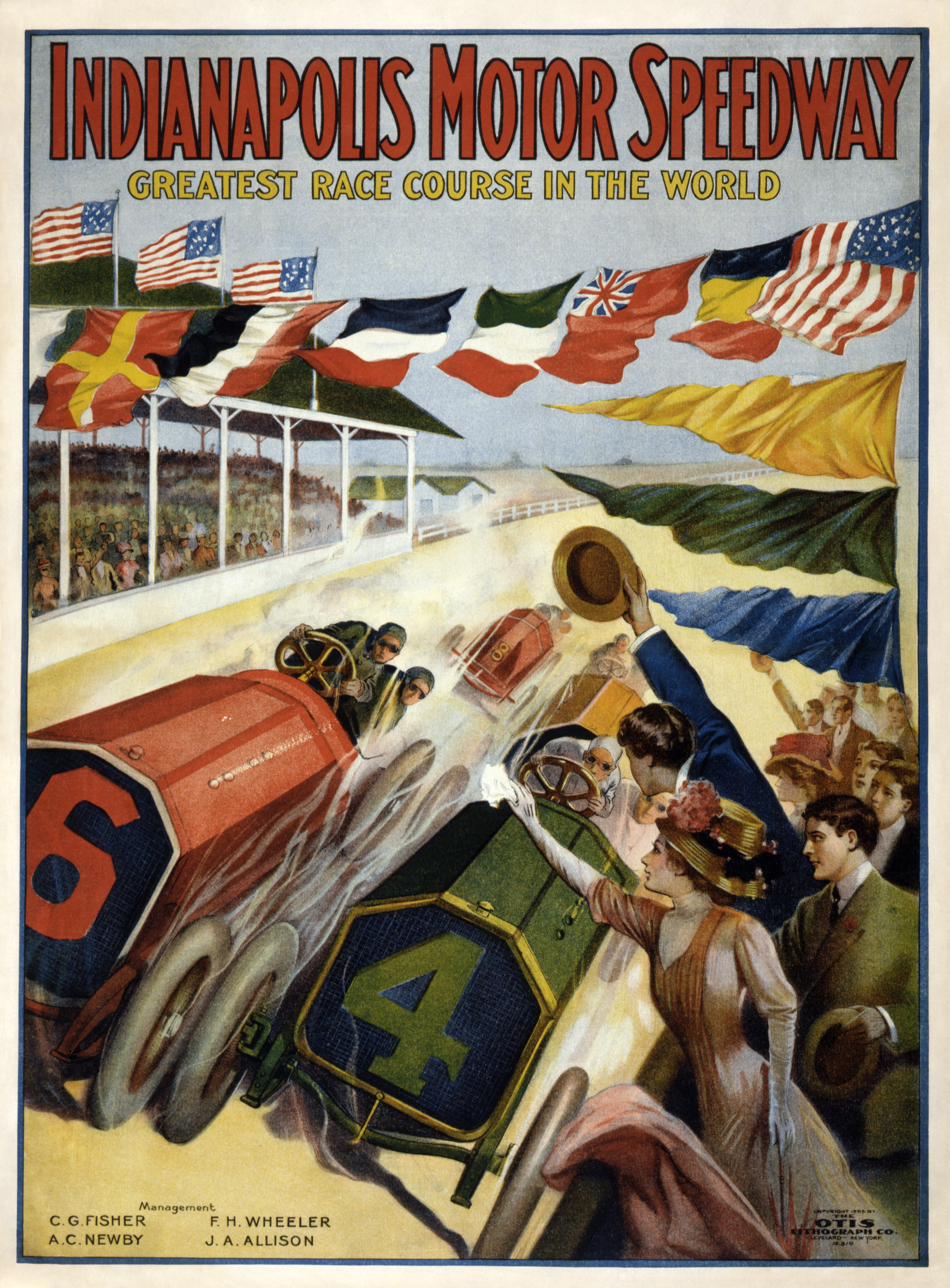
1909 poster advertising the speedway

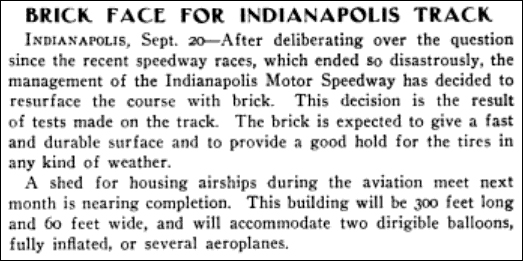
Indianapolis Motor Speedway – Automotive Industries, Volume 21 – September 23, 1909

Fisher and his partners began looking into the idea of paving the track with bricks or concrete. Paving in 1909 was still relatively new with only a few miles of public roads paved, leaving little knowledge of what would work best. Traction tests were conducted on bricks, proving they could hold up. Less than a month after the first car races, the repaving project began. Five Indiana manufacturers supplied 3.2 million 10-pound (4.5 kg) bricks to the track. Each was hand laid over a 2 in (51 mm) cushion of sand, then leveled and the gaps filled with mortar. At the same time, a concrete wall 33 in (840 mm) tall was constructed in front of the main grandstand and around all four corners to protect spectators. The final "gold" brick (actually gold-plated brass) was laid in a special ceremony by Governor Thomas R. Marshall. Before the work was completed, locals nicknamed the track The Brickyard. Today, 3 feet (0.91 m), or one yard, of original bricks remain exposed at the start-finish line.

In December 1909, eleven drivers and a few motorcyclists returned for speed trials. Drivers soon reached speeds of up to 112 mph (180 km/h) on the new surface. Racing returned in 1910, with a total of 66 automobile races held during three holiday weekends (Memorial Day, Independence Day and Labor Day). Each weekend featured two or three races of 100 to 200 mi (160 to 320 km), with several shorter contests. Each race stood on its own and earned its own trophy. All races were sanctioned by the AAA (as were the Indianapolis 500 races through 1955). 1910 also saw the speedway host the National Aviation Meet, featuring Wilbur and Orville Wright and highlighted by Walter Brookins setting a world record by taking a plane up to 4,938 feet (1,505 m).

=== Start of the Indianapolis 500 era (1911–1929) ===
A change in marketing focus led to only one race per year beginning in 1911. An estimated 80,000 spectators attended the first 500 mi (800 km) race on Memorial Day, May 30, 1911. Forty cars competed with Ray Harroun winning at an average speed of 74.602 mph (120.060 km/h). While all the other drivers in the race had a riding mechanic in their car, Harroun decided to save weight and go faster by driving solo. So, to be able to see what was happening behind his No. 32 Marmon "Wasp", he installed a rear-view mirror. It was the first time such a device was used in an automobile.

Advertisement for an Indianapolis Motor Speedway "Harvest Classic" race

A classic race followed in 1912, when Ralph DePalma lost a five-lap lead with five laps to go after his car broke down. As DePalma pushed his car around the circuit, Joe Dawson made up the deficit to win. Three of the next four winners were European, with DePalma being the exception as an American national, though originally Italian born. These races gave Indy a worldwide reputation and international drivers began to enter. The 1916 race was shortened to 120 laps, for a number of reasons including a lack of entries from Europe (there were so few entries that the speedway itself entered several cars), a lack of oil, and out of respect for the war in Europe.

On September 9, 1916, the speedway hosted a day of short racing events termed the "Harvest Classic", composed of three races held at 20-, 50-, and 100-mile (32, 80 and 160 km) distances. In the end, Johnny Aitken, in a Peugeot, would win all three events, his final victories at the facility. The Harvest Classic contests were the last races other than the Indianapolis 500 to be held on the grounds for seventy-eight years.

Racing was interrupted in 1917–1918 by World War I when the facility served as a military aviation repair and refueling depot, designated the Speedway Aviation Repair Depot, commanded by Captain Patrick Frissell. When racing resumed, speeds quickly increased.

In 1921, speedway co-founder Wheeler committed suicide.

At the 1925 event, Pete DePaolo became the first to average 100 mph (160 km/h) for the race, with a speed of 101.13 mph (162.75 km/h).

In July 1926, the neighborhood around the racetrack voted to incorporate itself (along with the track) as the independent town of Speedway, Indiana.

In 1926, Fisher and Allison were offered "a fortune" for the speedway site by a local real estate developer. They refused, selling instead to former racing driver (and World War One fighter ace) Edward V. Rickenbacker in 1927. How much he paid was not revealed. Rickenbacker built a golf course in the infield. The next year, Allison died from pneumonia.

=== "Junkyard" formula (1930s) ===
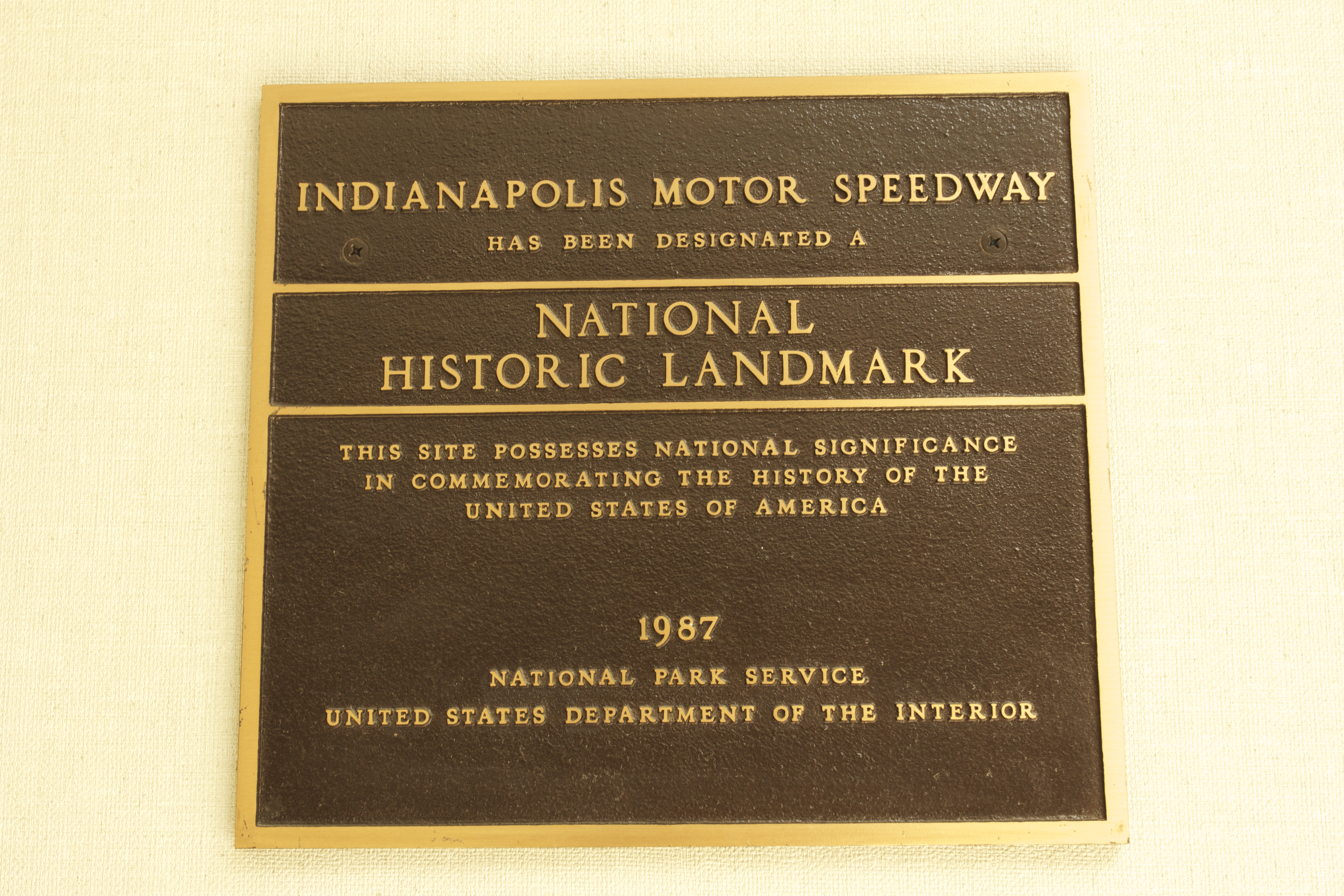
National Historic Landmark Plaque

With the Great Depression hitting the nation, the purse dropped from a winners share of $50,000 and a total of $98,250 in 1930 to $18,000 and $54,450, respectively. There is a common misconception the rules were "dumbed down" to what was called the "junkyard formula" to allow more entries during the depression. The rules were indeed changed, but it was due to an effort by the speedway to get more car manufacturers involved in the race by discouraging the entry of specialized racing machines that dominated the 500 during the mid- to late-1920s. The rule changes, in fact, were already being laid out before the market crash.

In 1931, Dave Evans performed a remarkable feat when his Cummins Diesel Special completed the entire 500 miles without a pit stop. It was also the first diesel entrant.

In 1933, a record 42 cars started the 500. For 1934, a maximum fuel consumption limit was imposed, 45 US gal (37 imp gal; 170 L). It became 42.5 US gal (35.4 imp gal; 161 L) in 1935 and 37.5 US gal (31.2 imp gal; 142 L) in 1936. When the limits resulted in several top competitors running out of fuel in the closing stages, the limits were abandoned, though the use of pump gasoline was still mandatory.

By the early 1930s, rising race speeds began to make the track increasingly dangerous, and in the period 1931–1935, there were 15 fatalities. This forced another repavement, with tarmac replacing the bricks in parts of the track. In addition, during the 1935–36 seasons the inside wall was removed in the corners, the outside wall was realigned (to change the angle compared to the track, reducing the potential for cars to vault over it), hard crash helmets became mandatory, and the first yellow light system was installed around the track. The continuing track dangers during this period, however, did not stop Louis Meyer or Wilbur Shaw from becoming the first two three-time winners, with Shaw also being the first back-to-back winner in 1939 and 1940.

=== Start of the Hulman era (1940s) ===
The IMS wing and wheel logo has been used since 1909. This variation was used from the 1960s through 2008.

At the beginning of the 1940s, the track required further improvements. In 1941, about a third of the "Gasoline Alley" garage area burned down before the race. With U.S. involvement in World War II, the 1942 500-mile race was canceled in December 1941. Owner Eddie Rickenbacker said the race would be suspended for the duration of the war. In 1942, AAA Contest Board suspended all auto racing, and the U.S. government moved to ban all auto racing, primarily on account of rationing. The race would not be held for four years (1942–1945). The track was more or less abandoned during the war and fell into a state of disrepair.

Many of the locals expected that the speedway would be sold after the war and become a housing development. With the end of the war in sight, on November 29, 1944, three-time 500 winner Wilbur Shaw came back to do a 500-mile (800 km) tire test approved by the government for Firestone. Shaw was shocked at the dilapidated state of the speedway and contacted owner Eddie Rickenbacker, only to discover that it was for sale. Shaw then sent out letters to the automobile industry to try to find a buyer. All the responses indicated that the speedway would be turned into a private facility for the buyer. Shaw then looked around for someone to buy the speedway who would reopen the racetrack as a public venue. He found Terre Haute businessman Tony Hulman. Meetings were set up and the speedway was purchased on November 14, 1945. Though not officially acknowledged, the purchase price for the speedway was reported by the Indianapolis Star and News to be $750,000. Major renovations and repairs were made at a quick pace to the frail speedway, in time for the 1946 race. Since the record 42 cars that started the 1933 edition of the 500, the field size has been set at 33 drivers, with only three exceptions to this rule, the first being 1947, when only 30 cars started due to a strike by certain teams affiliated with the ASPAR drivers, owners and sponsors association.

Since then the speedway has continued to grow. Stands have been built and remodeled many times over, suites and museums were added, and many other additions helped bring back Indy's reputation as a great track.

=== Fabulous roadsters (1950s) ===
In the 1950s, cars were topping out at 150 mph (240 km/h), helping to draw more and more fans. The low-slung, sleek cars were known as roadsters, and the Kurtis, Kuzma, and Watson chassis dominated the field. Nearly all were powered by the Offenhauser, or "Offy", engines. The crowd favorite Novi, with its unique sound and look, was the most powerful car of the decade that dominated time trials. However, they would never make the full 500 mi (800 km) in first place, often breaking down before the end or having to make too many pit stops because of the massive engine's thirst for fuel and the weight that went with the extra fuel.

The track's reputation improved so much that the 500-mile race became part of the World Championship for Drivers for 11 years (1950–1960), although Ferrari's Alberto Ascari was the only driver to compete in both the championship's Grand Prix races and the 500 during this period, competing the 500 once in 1952. Five-time world champion Juan Fangio practiced at the speedway in 1958 but ultimately decided against racing there. The 1950s were also the most dangerous era of American racing. Of the 33 drivers to qualify for the 1953 race, nearly half, 16, eventually died in racing accidents.

=== Rear-engine revolution (1960s–1990s) ===
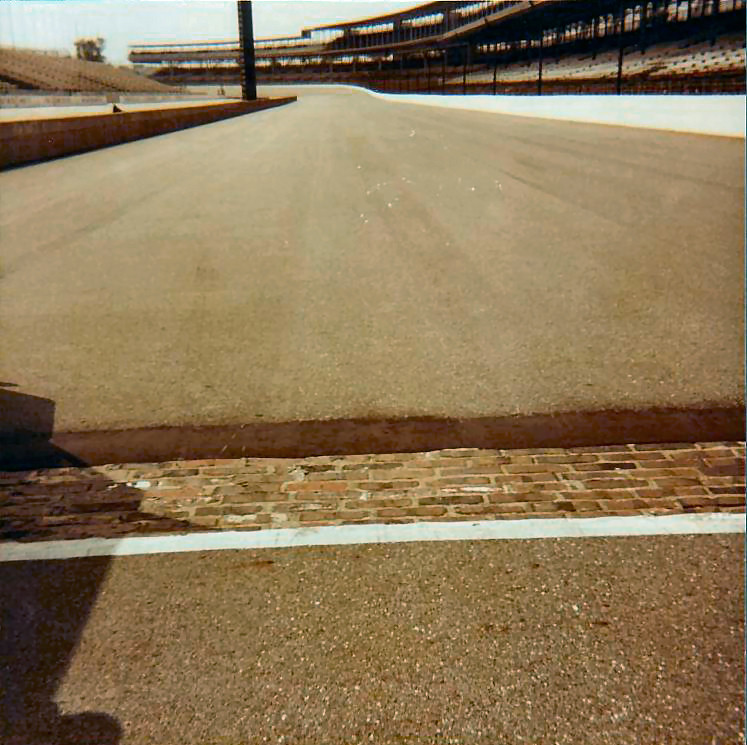
Starting line, featuring the Yard of Bricks

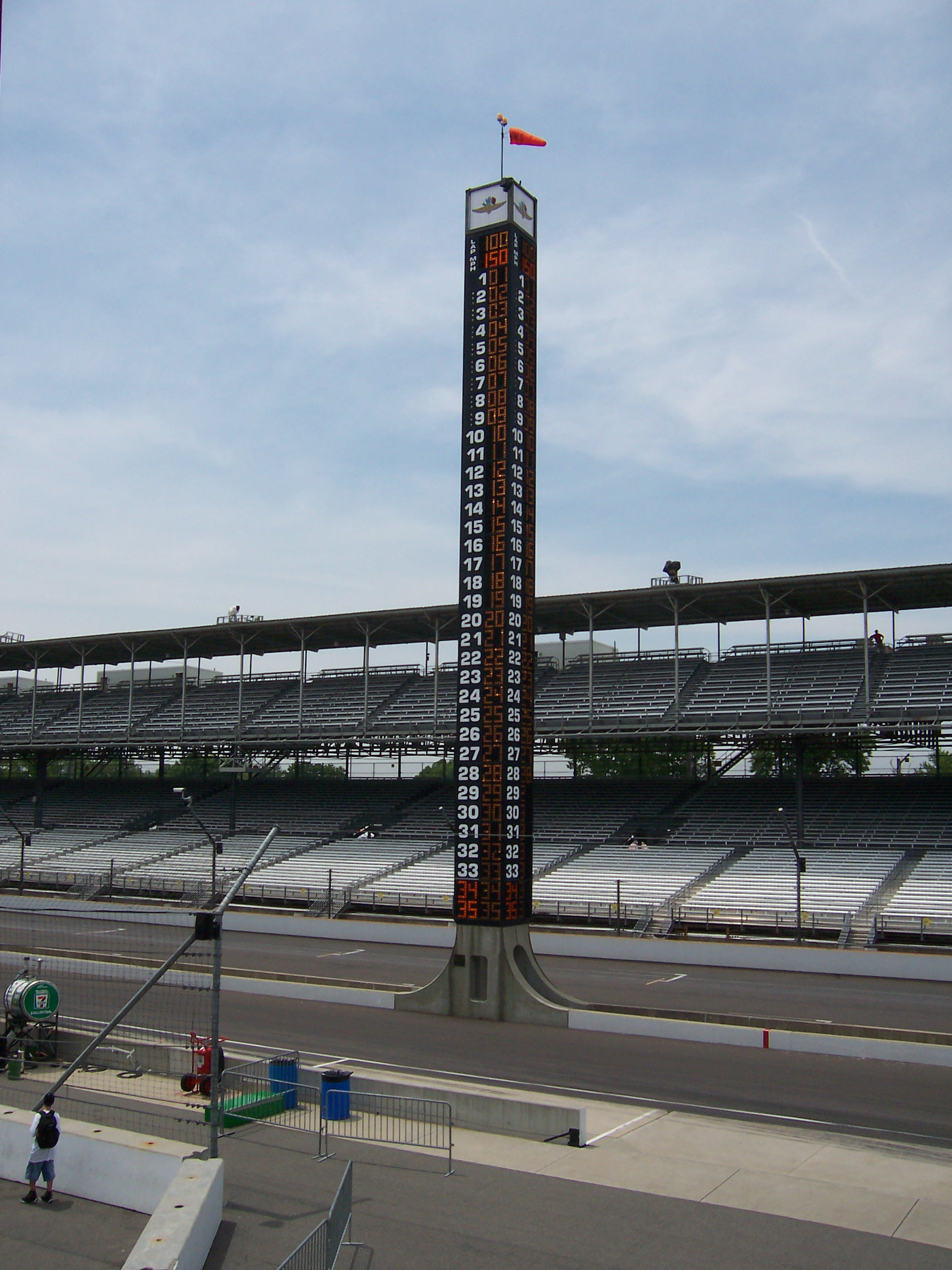
The pylon used from 1994 until the 2014 SVRA vintage races in June was replaced by a digital video screen for the 2014 Brickyard 400.

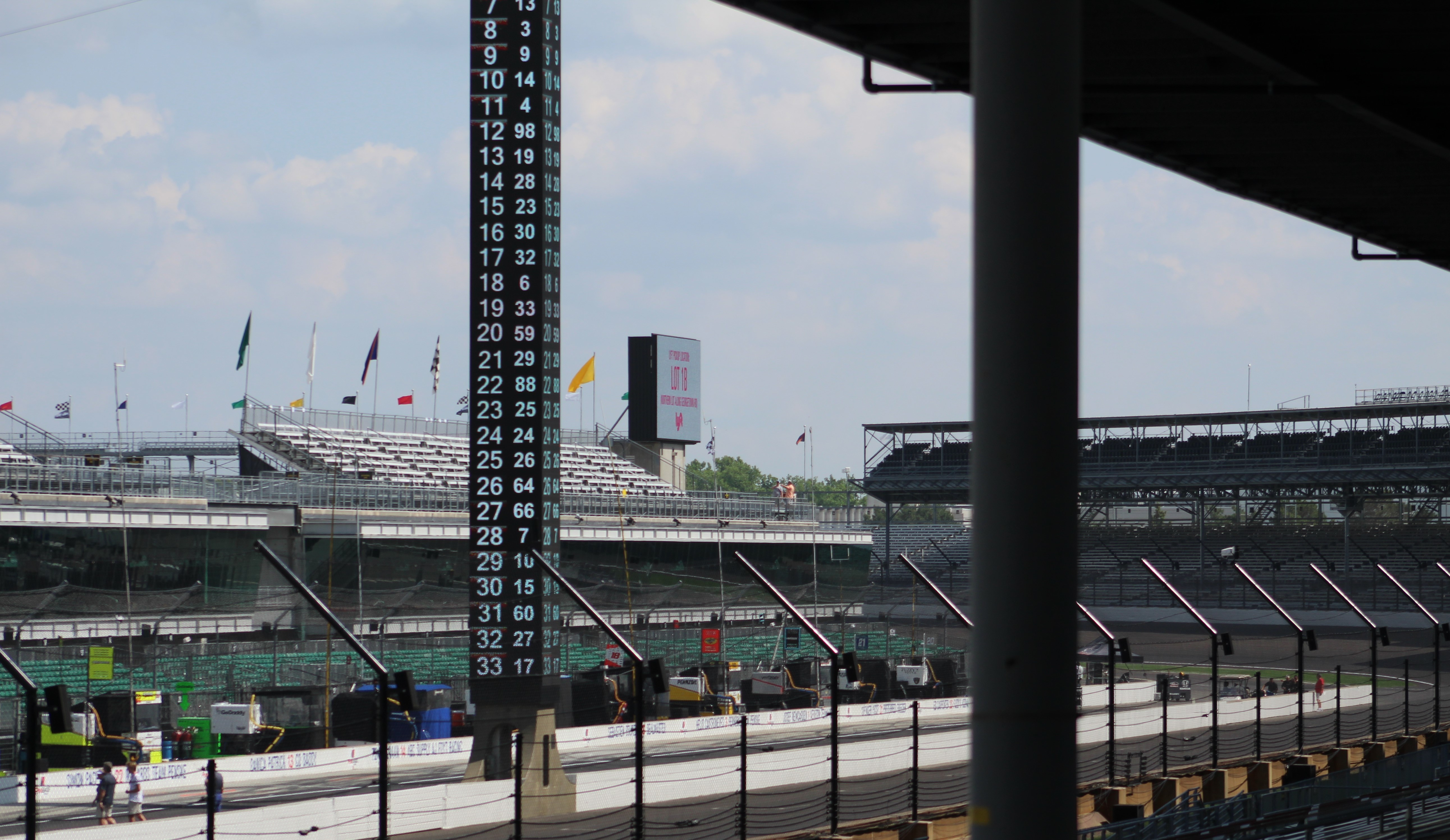
The current digital video screen pylon

In October 1961, the final remaining brick sections of the track were paved over with asphalt, with the exception of a distinct three-foot-wide line of bricks at the start-finish line. The "Brickyard" thus became known for its "Yard of Bricks". After being widely ignored by Formula One drivers when it was a World Championship event, a wave of F1 drivers went to the speedway in the 1960s, and the rear-engine revolution that was started by the Cooper F1 team changed the face of the 500 as well, with 1959 and 1960 world drivers' champion Jack Brabham of Australia qualifying his Cooper in 13th for the 1961 race. The Cooper used a smaller (2.7-liter) and less powerful Coventry Climax engine compared to the 4.4-liter Offy engines used by the other 32 cars and was slower on the straights, but many took note of the British car's superior handling through the turns. Brabham qualified 17th and after running as high as third, would ultimately finish ninth after completing all 200 laps. Despite this, many doubters claimed the rear-engine cars were for drivers who liked to be pushed around, though as Brabham said "It started the rear-engined revolution at Indy".

A. J. Foyt, who had won his first 500 in 1961, won the 1964 Indianapolis 500, which was the last ever win for a front-engine car, and since Jim Clark's win driving the rear-engine Lotus 38 in 1965, every winner has driven a rear-engine car. Graham Hill won the following year in his first attempt, eventually becoming the only driver to date to achieve auto racing's "Triple Crown of Motorsport" of winning the Monaco Grand Prix, Indianapolis 500, and Le Mans 24 Hours. There were enough Americans to compete with them, with A. J. Foyt, Mario Andretti, and the Unser brothers Bobby and Al leading the charge in the 1960s and 1970s, of whom Foyt and Al Unser would eventually become, respectively, the first two of four drivers, to date, to win four times each, while Bobby Unser won the race three times, with Andretti only ever winning the race once, in 1969. Andretti would go on to race in F1 and win the world championship in 1978 with Team Lotus, who had been the first rear-engine winners at Indy, with Clark, in 1965.

From 1970 to 1981, Indianapolis had a twin in the city of Ontario, California, by the name of the Ontario Motor Speedway. This track was known as the "Indianapolis of the West" and the home of the California 500, but was a financial failure due to poor management and not holding enough races on the racetrack.

In the 1977 Indy 500, Janet Guthrie made history when she became the first female driver to qualify for the race. Guthrie started the race from 18th position but retired with timing gear failure after 27 laps. She was eventually classified 29th. 1977 also saw A. J. Foyt make history when he became the first driver to win the race four times.

1979 saw the second exception to the 1934 33-driver field rule. By the late 1970s there arose some resistance from certain car owners and drivers as to the direction being taken by USAC, the auto racing sanctioning body that among other things, governed the Indianapolis 500 event. Some of the dissident teams formed their own racing body, Championship Auto Racing Teams (CART). USAC responded by barring six of the most famous teams in the sport from qualification (including Roger Penske and Dan Gurney), for "undermining the well-being of USAC". The ruling would sideline former Indy winners Bobby Unser, Al Unser Sr., Gordon Johncock, and Johnny Rutherford. After a court injunction in favor of CART, and a controversy where exhaust pipe rules were clarified after qualifications began and certain teams with an altered exhaust pipe were "locked into" the field, USAC held an additional qualification round on the day before the race, announcing that any driver who could post a faster speed than the slowest qualifier (Roger McCluskey) would be allowed to start the race. Bill Vukovich and George Snider were added to the lineup, bringing the field to 35. A crisis was averted for the moment, but USAC's handling of both issues was seen as bungling by some people, and as outright manipulation by others, and that year spelled the beginning of the end for USAC's governance of the Indy Car series.

The 1980s brought a new generation of speedsters, led by four-time race winner Rick Mears who also broke the 220 mph (350 km/h) speed mark in qualifying (1989) and won six pole positions. Other stars of the decade included Danny Sullivan, Bobby Rahal, and F1 veteran Emerson Fittipaldi. The 1989 race came down to a final ten-lap, a thrilling duel between Fittipaldi and Al Unser Jr., culminating in Unser crashing in the third turn of the 199th lap after making contact with Fittpaldi's right front tire.

The early 1990s witnessed Arie Luyendyk winning in what was then the fastest 500 to date, with an average speed of 185.981 mph (299.307 km/h). That record was not eclipsed for almost a quarter of a century until Tony Kanaan won the 2013 race with an average speed of over 187 mph (301 km/h). Rick Mears became the third four-time winner after a late-race duel with Michael Andretti in 1991, and in 1992, Al Unser Jr. eked out a hard-fought victory by defeating last-place-starting driver Scott Goodyear by 0.043 of a second, a margin that stood for 34 years as the closest finish in race history. The 500 got a new look in 1996 when it became an Indy Racing League event, formed as a rival to CART.

There was another qualifying controversy in 1996 and 1997, arising over the IRL's "25/8 rule" which locked the previous year's top-25 overall points finishers into the Indianapolis race, regardless of their qualifying speed, leaving only eight spots open for entries to qualify on speed alone. The rule effectively locked out the CART series regulars from competing for qualifying spots in the Indy 500. CART responded by holding their own event, the U.S. 500, on the same day as the 1996 Indianapolis 500. While the new qualifying format was not a factor in 1996, it would backfire in 1997 when two drivers who posted qualifying speeds fast enough to make the race were bumped to make room for slower locked-in cars with more 1996-97 championship points. Hemelgarn Racing, who owned the two cars victimized in the scenario, protested to the IRL that the field would not include the 33 fastest cars. After Bump Day was completed, the series elected to add the two bumped cars, driven by Johnny Unser and Lyn St. James, back into the field, bringing the number of starters to 35. This marked the last time the 500's starting field has been larger than 33 drivers.

=== American open-wheel unification (2000s) ===
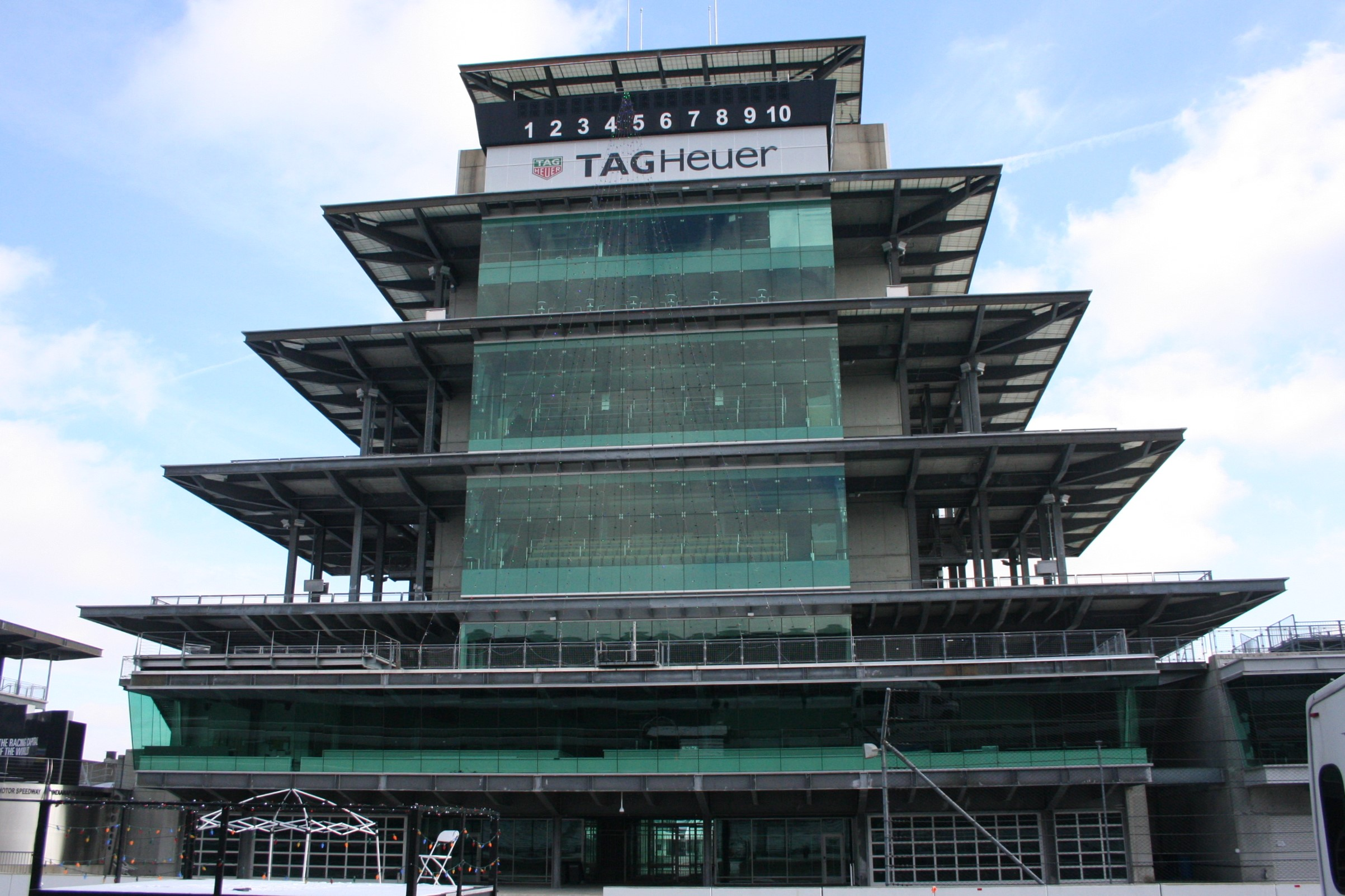
The Pagoda was completed in 2000 as part of the project to host the United States Grand Prix.

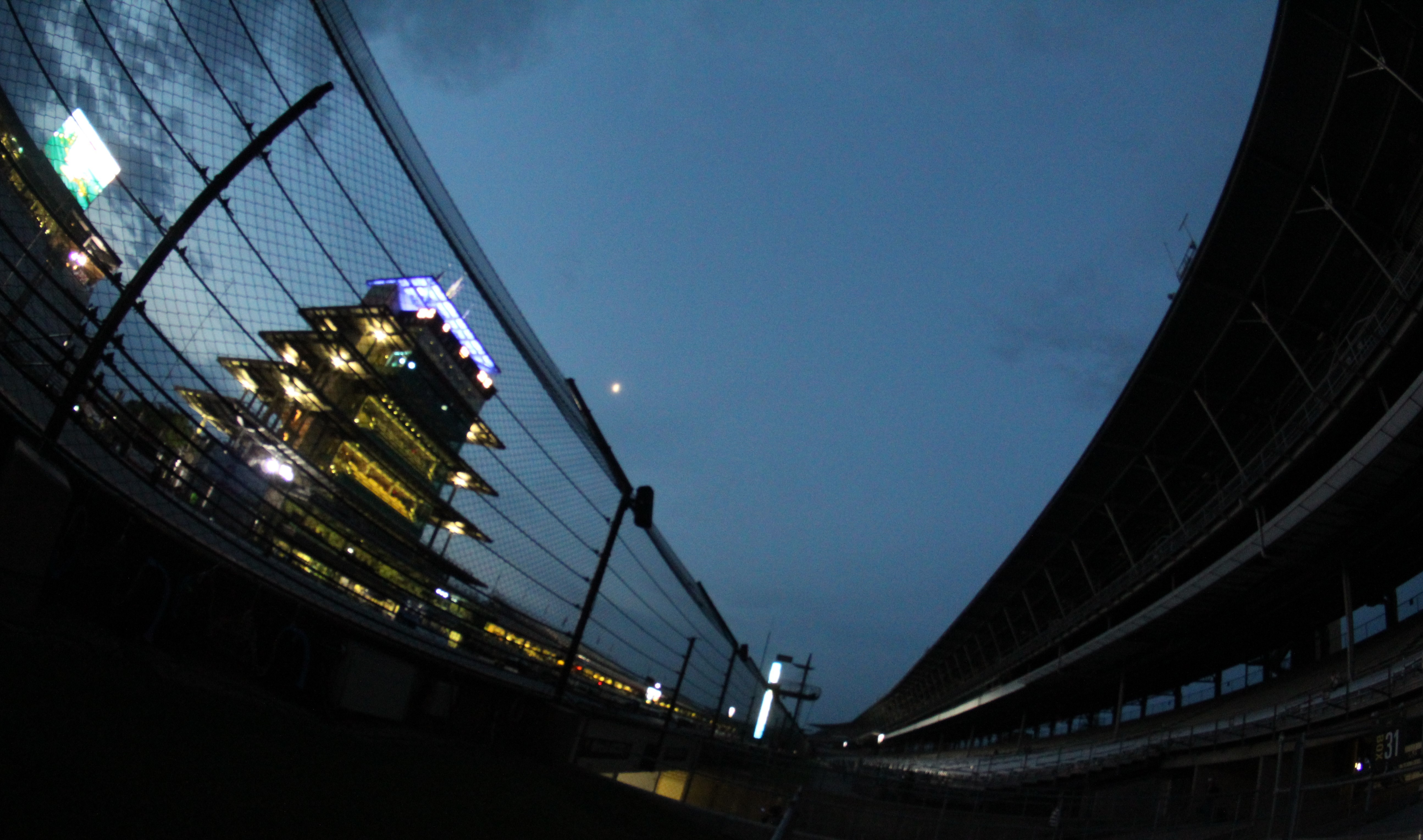
The Pagoda in the early morning

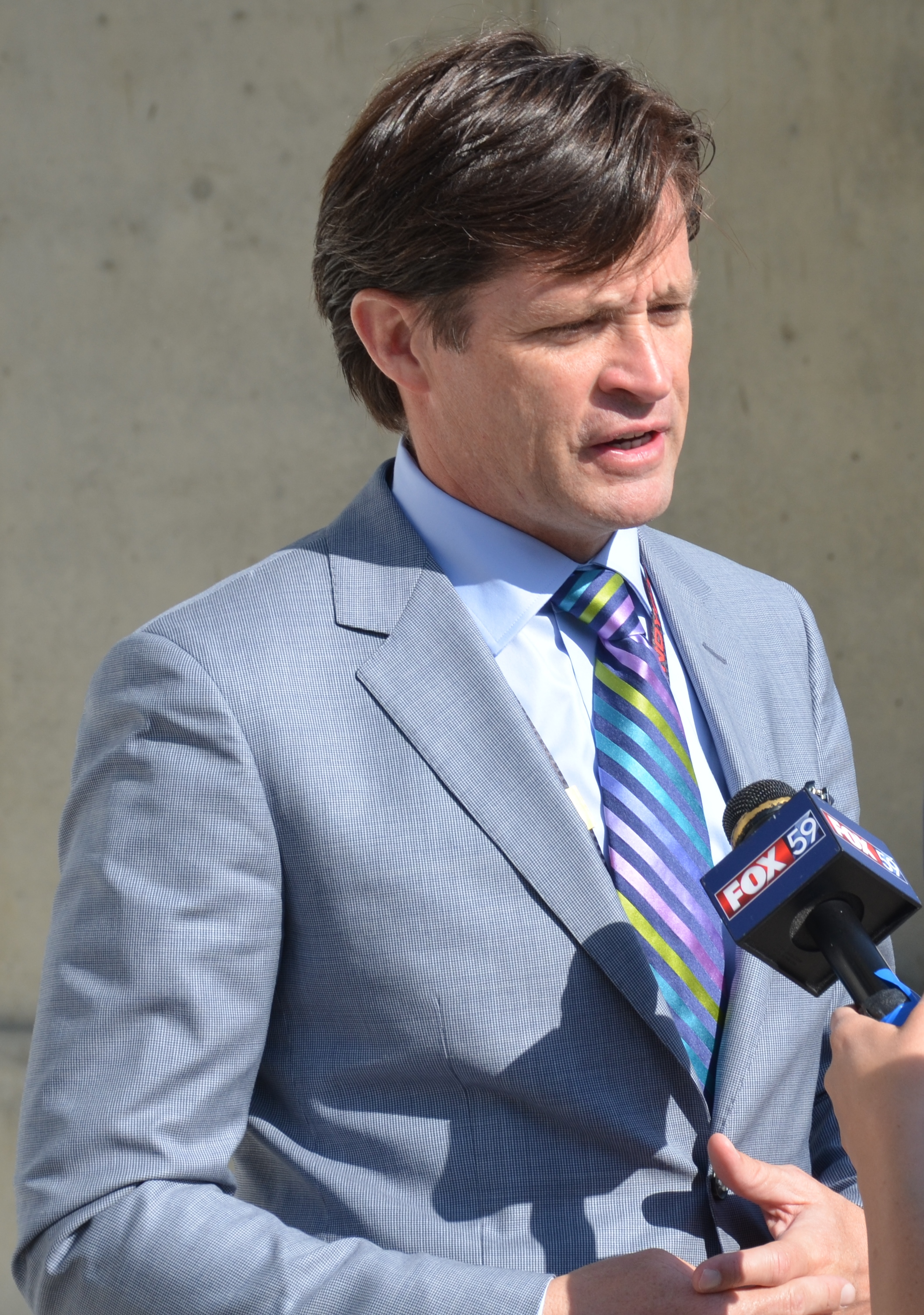
Indianapolis Motor Speedway President Doug Boles at the 2015 Indianapolis 500

The early 2000s saw drivers from the rival CART series begin to cross over to compete at the Indianapolis 500. In the 2000 Indianapolis 500, multiple CART champion team Chip Ganassi Racing brought their drivers Juan Pablo Montoya and Jimmy Vasser to Indianapolis. Montoya qualified second, led 167 laps, and won the race convincingly, becoming the eighth Indy 500 rookie to win the race. The next year, Team Penske made its return to the Indianapolis 500 after a five-year absence and was joined by Ganassi, Walker Racing and Michael Andretti, driving for Team Kool Green in a separate effort headed by Kim Green, known as "Team Motorola". For the second straight year, an Indy rookie won the race as Hélio Castroneves took the checkered flag. Roger Penske then elected to move his entire operation over to the IRL beginning in 2002, taking Castroneves and teammate Gil de Ferran with him. After fielding one car in 2002, Ganassi Racing followed Penske to the IRL full-time for the 2003 season. Michael Andretti, who had left his long-time ride at Newman-Haas Racing because he wanted to run the Indianapolis 500 again (something they were not willing to do), bought a majority interest in CART's Team Green, which returned to Indianapolis in 2002 with Dario Franchitti, Paul Tracy and Michael Andretti, and moved it to the IRL that same year as Andretti Green Racing, and in 2004 former CART champion Bobby Rahal's operation moved to the IRL as Rahal Letterman Racing. Castroneves repeated his Indianapolis 500 win in 2002 despite controversial circumstances involving a late-race caution and a pass made by Tracy, and his teammate de Ferran won in 2003.

In 2003, the Indy Lights Series, a minor league series to the IndyCar Series, made history with the first May race at the track since 1910, other than the 500. The Freedom 100, first held during the final qualifying weekend, has been moved to "carb day" on the Friday before the 500. From 2005 to 2007, the Indy Lights became the first racing series since 1916 to run at the racecourse twice in one year. The first event being the Freedom 100, held on the oval track as part of the Indianapolis 500 weekend, and the second event, the Liberty Challenge, during the United States Grand Prix weekend, competing on the Grand Prix road course.

Buddy Rice became the first American driver since 1998 to win the race in the rain-shortened 2004 Indianapolis 500. At the time, Rice drove for the team co-owned by 1986 Indianapolis 500 winner Bobby Rahal and the Indiana native television talk show host and comedian David Letterman. In 2005, Danica Patrick became the first female driver to lead the race at Indianapolis, after acquiring it for a lap near the 125 mi (201 km) mark while cycling through pit stops. Dan Wheldon would go on to win the 2005 Indianapolis 500.

Sam Hornish Jr. became the first driver to ever overtake for the lead on the race's final lap, ultimately winning the 2006 Indianapolis 500 in the last 450 ft (140 m) by a 0.0635-second margin over rookie Marco Andretti. Dario Franchitti became the first native of Scotland since Jim Clark's victory in 1965 to win, in the rain-shortened 2007 Indianapolis 500.

In mid-February 2008, Champ Car filed for bankruptcy. In late February, an agreement was reached for Champ Car to be merged with the IRL, and the first IRL IndyCar Series season since the unification took place in 2008. Scott Dixon, driving for Chip Ganassi Racing, became the first native of New Zealand to win, in the 2008 Indianapolis 500.

In the 100th anniversary year of the construction of the Indianapolis Motor Speedway, Hélio Castroneves became the sixth three-time winner of the 500 in the 2009 Indianapolis 500. Danica Patrick also had her best finish ever (third place) in the race, also the best finish ever by a woman in the history of the Indianapolis 500.

=== Foreign domination (2010s) ===
The 2010, 2011 and 2012 runnings of the race saw three consecutive British victories, namely for previous winners Franchitti (2010 and 2012) and the late Wheldon winning in 2011 just a few months before his fatal crash at Las Vegas. Brazilian Tony Kanaan won the 2013 running, before American Ryan Hunter-Reay ended an eight-year streak of foreign winners in 2014.

Previous winner Montoya had returned to IndyCar competition and secured a 2015 win to make himself a two-time winner with a fifteen-year gap between triumphs. The event saw Canadian James Hinchcliffe survive a life-threatening impact in practice. The 2016 race saw another American race winner when rookie Alexander Rossi stretched his fuel mileage to record an upset win in a race where he had been off the leaders' pace.

The 2017 race saw former Formula One World Champion Fernando Alonso take off from the Monaco Grand Prix to take part in a one-off event, being highly competitive up front before his engine blew. The races' polesitter and 2008 winner Scott Dixon escaped a huge airborne crash largely unhurt. In spite of heavy crashes, the speedway had now gone more than 20 years without a fatality as the SAFER barriers and the enhanced IndyCars absorbed more of the violent impacts. The race was eventually won by Takuma Sato, who became the first Japanese and Asian winner of the event.

In 2018, Australian former series' champions Will Power won the race after a decade of participation as the first Australian to win the 500, whereas his Penske teammate Simon Pagenaud repeated that feat, becoming the first French winner of the race since 1920, in 2019 after a last-lap duel with 2016 winner Rossi.

=== Start of Penske era (2020s) ===
In 2020, the Indianapolis Motor Speedway, as with IndyCar Series and other related holdings, was sold to Penske Entertainment Corp., a subsidiary of the Penske Corporation, owned by Roger Penske.

In 2020, because of the COVID-19 pandemic, the Indianapolis 500 was not held in late May and instead was held in August. 2017 winner Takuma Sato won the race for the second time after taking lead at lap 186.

In 2021, Brazilian three-time winner Hélio Castroneves won the race after a late-race duel with Álex Palou; he joined A. J. Foyt, Al Unser Sr. and Rick Mears as four-time winners; this race was also the first victory for Meyer Shank Racing.

In May 2022, IMS announced it had become a Caesars Sportsbook partner beginning with the NTT Indy car series' GMR Grand Prix on May 14. As part of the deal, the gaming operator opened the Caesars Sportsbook Lounge at the track's Pagoda Plaza.

=== Overview of different track layouts ===
Since 2000, various road course layouts have been used for additional races at the Indianapolis Motor Speedway:

Indianapolis Motor Speedway Layout History
Original Speedway (1909–present)

Original Formula One Grand Prix Circuit (2000–2007)

Modified Grand Prix Circuit (2008–2013)

Original Motorcycle Circuit (2008–2013)

Speedway (2008–2013)

IndyCar Grand Prix Circuit (2014–present)

Modified Motorcycle Circuit (2014–present)

Speedway (2014–present)

== Other racing events ==
=== NASCAR ===
From 1919 to 1993, the Indianapolis 500 was the only sanctioned race held at the Speedway. When Tony George (Hulman's grandson) inherited the track, he spearheaded an effort to bring more racing events to the track. In August 1994, the Brickyard 400 for the NASCAR Winston Cup Series made its debut, and at the time, featured the largest crowd and largest cash purse in NASCAR history. From 1998 to 2003, an IROC event was held as a support race.

Since 2012, the Cup race has been supported by the Pennzoil 150 of the NASCAR Xfinity Series; in 2020, the race was moved to the infield road course. The Cup race followed suit in 2021 and was renamed the Verizon 200.

=== Formula One ===
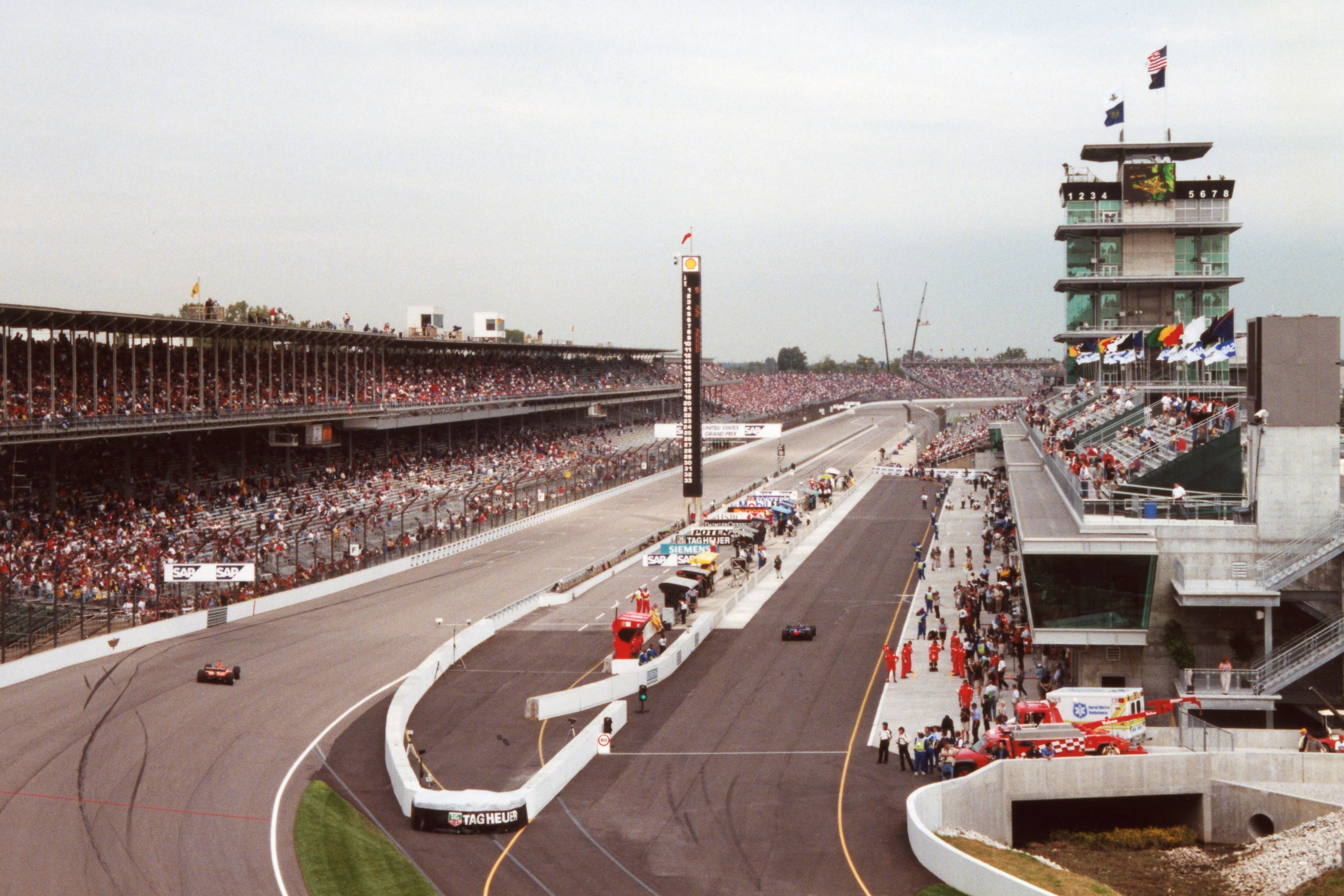
The 2000 United States Grand Prix was the first event at IMS to be held clockwise.

In 1998, Tony George arranged for Formula One to return to the United States for the first time since 1991. A two-year renovation and construction project added an infield road course, new pit garages and a new Pagoda building containing race control and the media center. The road course had been designed internally by IMS in 1992, with the Brickyard golf course redesign taking the future road course into account.

The project culminated in the first United States Grand Prix at the facility in 2000. With over 200,000 spectators in attendance, it was one of the largest crowds in the history of Formula One and considered a huge success. The race was also pivotal to Michael Schumacher's winning of the 2000 World Championship, as he came out on top when Mika Häkkinen's engine blew, resulting in an eight-point lead of the championship that set Schumacher up to need only one win in the remaining two races, something he achieved at the next event.

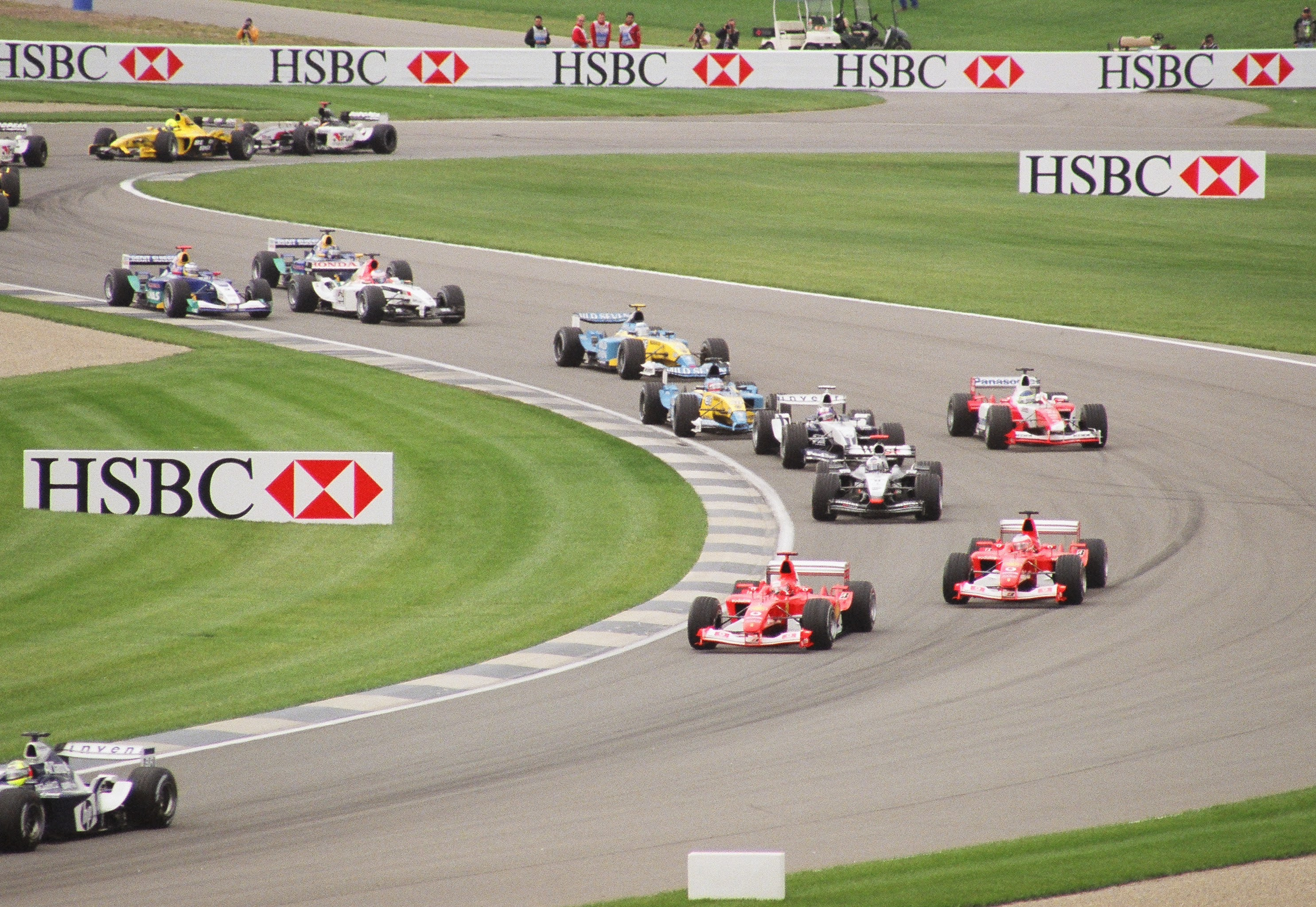
Cars wind through the infield section at the start of the 2003 United States Grand Prix.

The short history of the event, however, was littered with controversies. The 2002 United States Grand Prix was marred by a bizarre ending, in which Michael Schumacher, having already clinched the championship, seemingly tried to stage a dead heat with teammate Rubens Barrichello. The official timings showed Barrichello ahead by 0.011 seconds at the line, leading fans and media to dub the event a farce. The 2002 race was also the first-ever Formula One race to use SAFER barriers. In 2003 Schumacher once more set himself up for the title with an Indianapolis win in a dramatic wet-dry event. The 2005 race turned out to be one of the most controversial races in motorsport history. Michelin realized their tires were ill-equipped for the banking after two heavy crashes for Toyota both for Ralf Schumacher and stand-in Ricardo Zonta, and at the last second, the Michelin teams pulled into the pits at the end of the formation lap, leaving only the three Bridgestone teams (six cars) to contest the race. Fans and media were highly critical of the poor handling of the situation. Many fans walked out, and costly ticket refunds were issued. The 2005 event was not the first tire issue for Michelin at the track, as a blowout caused Ralf Schumacher to crash and fracture his back in the 2004 race, while Fernando Alonso also suffered a tire blowout at the end of the start-finish straight in that same event.

Despite the outrage of the 2005 event, the race returned for two additional years. The race did not enjoy the level of success of its earlier runnings, and attendance and interest fell dramatically. The race was left off the calendar for 2008, and efforts to revive the race for 2009 were not successful. In 2012, the U.S. Grand Prix relocated to the Circuit of the Americas.

=== MotoGP ===
From 2008 to 2015, the speedway hosted a round of Grand Prix motorcycle racing. The race marked the first motorcycle racing event at the facility since 1909.

Modifications approved by the FIA and FIM were made to the combined road course, bringing the new layout to a total of 16 turns. The motorcycle course was designed to run counter-clockwise, the same direction as the oval events. The banking of oval turn one was bypassed by a new infield section, dubbed the "Snake Pit Complex". In addition, the double-hairpin after the Hulman Straight was replaced with traditional esses.

On September 12, 2019, the Speedway announced motorcycle racing will return on the FIM-approved circuit with the MotoAmerica Championship of Indianapolis, which will be part of the Motorcycles on Meridian motorcycle festival. The Indianapolis festival will join Sturgis Motorcycle Rally (American Flat Track) and Daytona Beach Bike Week (Daytona 200 American Sportbike Racing Association championship) as hosts of major motorcycle racing events that run with motorcycle festivals. It will mark MotoAmerica's first race at the Speedway since 2015, and the first as a stand-alone race with the five major championships participating.

=== IndyCar Grand Prix ===
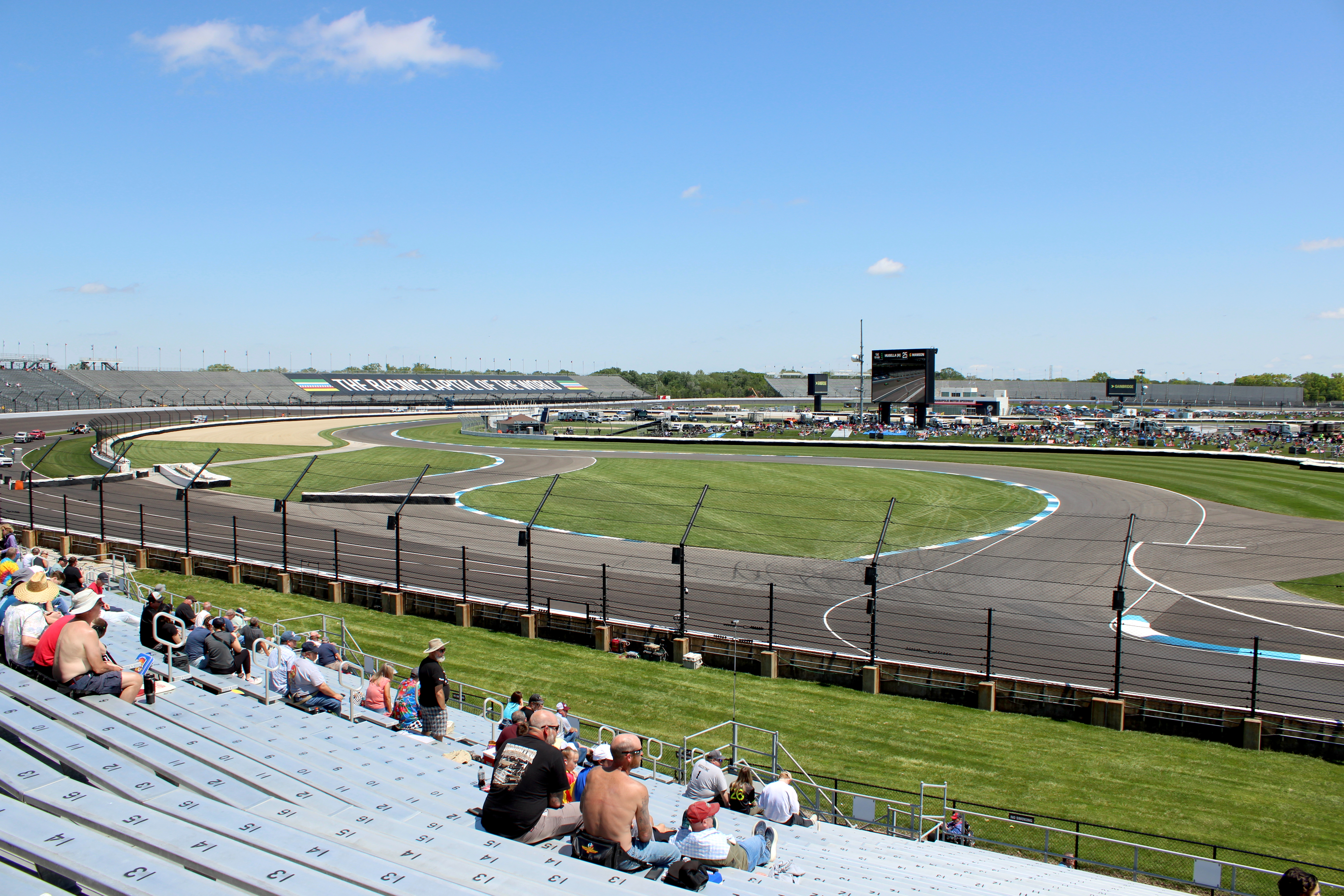
Indianapolis Motor Speedway before the 2026 Sonsio Grand Prix

Beginning in 2014, the IndyCar Series began holding a race on the combined road course in early May, serving as a lead-in to the Indianapolis 500. The infield road course was modified once again, to make the circuit more competitive, better for fans, and more suited for Indy cars.

=== Brickyard Vintage Racing Invitational ===
The Brickyard Vintage Racing Invitational, held in mid-June, is a racing meet for vintage racing, held on the road course. The event is sanctioned by the Sportscar Vintage Racing Association. In addition to multiple classes of racing on the road course, oval track exhibitions featuring historical Indy cars have also been part of the event. The feature event of the weekend is the annual Indy Legends Charity Pro–Am race.

=== Indy Autonomous Challenge ===
In October 2021 the IMS was the location for the first race with full autonomous race cars as a successor of the DARPA Grand Challenge. University teams from all over the world competed in developing software for high speed autonomous driving on the IMS oval. All teams were using a Dallara Indy Lights vehicle equipped with sensors (lidar, radar, camera) and computation hardware. The teams development a full autonomous driving software stack that enables perception, planning and control on the racetrack. The competition was won by the team "TUM Autonomous Motorsport" from the Technical University of Munich which was awarded prize money of $1 million.

== Brickyard Crossing Golf Course ==
From 1960 to 1968, the Speedway Golf Course hosted a PGA Tour event, the 500 Festival Open Invitation; its earlier editions were held during the days surrounding the Indy 500 race week. In 1968, it also held an LPGA tournament, the 500 Ladies Classic in mid-June, won by Mickey Wright. A reconstruction project was completed in 1993, converting the 27-hole layout (18 holes outside, nine in the infield) to an 18-hole championship course designed by legendary golf architect Pete Dye. Renamed "Brickyard Crossing", it features 14 holes outside, and four holes in the infield, with an infield lake. At par 72, it measures 7,180 yards (6,565 m) from the back tees with a course rating of 75.1 and a slope of 149.

A senior tour event, the Brickyard Crossing Championship, was played there from 1994 through 2000, and it has also hosted college tournaments. An LPGA event, Indy Women in Tech Championship, debuted in 2017.

Brickyard Crossing
| Tee | Rating/Slope | 1 | 2 | 3 | 4 | 5 | 6 | 7 | 8 | 9 | Out | 10 | 11 | 12 | 13 | 14 | 15 | 16 | 17 | 18 | In | Total |
| Gold | 75.1 / 149 | 378 | 570 | 369 | 215 | 465 | 542 | 181 | 464 | 383 | 3567 | 353 | 462 | 581 | 193 | 311 | 551 | 465 | 206 | 491 | 3613 | 7180 |
| Blue | 72.2 / 142 | 353 | 510 | 342 | 194 | 405 | 518 | 174 | 430 | 371 | 3297 | 340 | 425 | 520 | 175 | 298 | 531 | 415 | 183 | 437 | 3324 | 6621 |
| White | 69.5 / 137 | 333 | 492 | 322 | 165 | 373 | 489 | 155 | 370 | 347 | 3046 | 308 | 385 | 488 | 158 | 270 | 493 | 345 | 155 | 380 | 2982 | 6028 |
| Green | 67.5 / 132 | 307 | 471 | 291 | 157 | 355 | 437 | 147 | 349 | 339 | 2853 | 285 | 331 | 440 | 140 | 246 | 443 | 336 | 155 | 361 | 2737 | 5590 |
| SI | Men's | 17 | 5 | 13 | 9 | 3 | 15 | 7 | 1 | 11 | | 16 | 6 | 10 | 14 | 18 | 4 | 8 | 12 | 2 |
| Par | | 4 | 5 | 4 | 3 | 4 | 5 | 3 | 4 | 4 | 36 | 4 | 4 | 5 | 3 | 4 | 5 | 4 | 3 | 4 | 36 | 72 |
| Red | 69.7 / 130 | 310 | 407 | 223 | 118 | 320 | 420 | 125 | 298 | 285 | 2506 | 245 | 310 | 425 | 125 | 220 | 423 | 292 | 143 | 349 | 2532 | 5038 |
| SI | Ladies' | 7 | 3 | 13 | 17 | 5 | 1 | 15 | 9 | 11 | | 12 | 8 | 4 | 18 | 14 | 2 | 10 | 16 | 6 |

== Other events ==
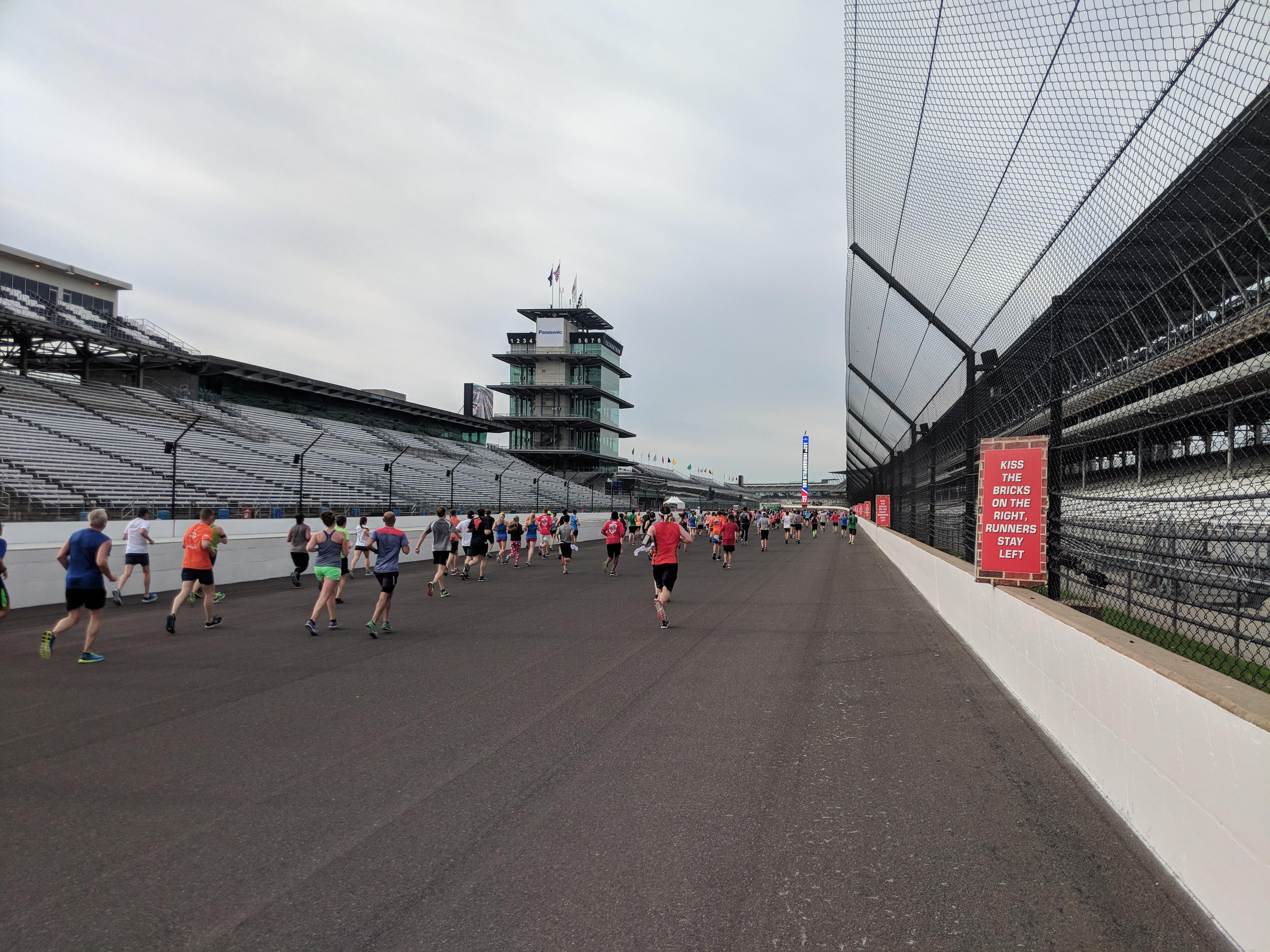
500 Festival Mini-Marathon participants at the Indianapolis Motor Speedway in 2018

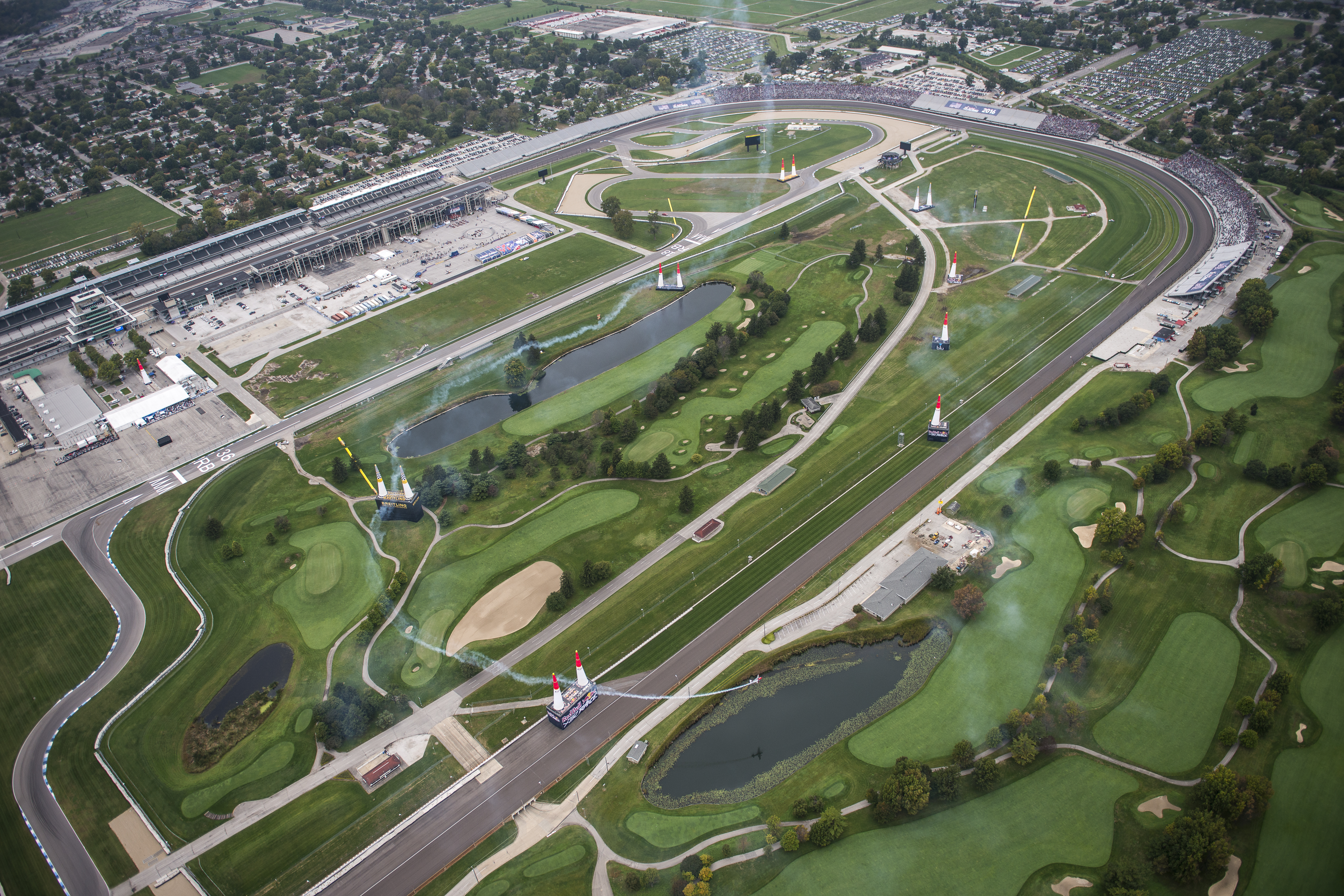
IMS hosted the 2016 Red Bull Air Race World Championship's seventh round.

- The 500 Festival Mini-Marathon, a half marathon held annually in May since 1977 (except 2020), includes one lap around the track. The event marks the official start to the "Month of May" events preceding the Indianapolis 500.
- August 8, 1987: IMS hosted the opening ceremonies for the 1987 Pan American Games before 80,000 spectators. IMS also hosted the games' speed roller skating competition on August 9, 11–12.
- IMS hosted the Centennial Era Balloon Festival presented by AT&T on May 1–3, 2009; May 8, 2010; and May 7, 2011.
- Since the mid-2000s, the speedway has occasionally hosted USAC quarter midget races on an infield oval.
- January 31, 2012: The Pagoda at IMS hosted nearly 3,500 guests for the 2012 Indianapolis Super Bowl Host Committee kickoff event leading to Super Bowl XLVI.
- October 2016–October 2018: IMS hosted rounds of the Red Bull Air Race World Championship in 2016, 2017, and 2018.
- 2016–2019: IMS hosts a 2-mile drive of Christmas lights in the infield and on the main straightaway of the track during the holiday season. It was cancelled in October 2020 and has not returned since.
- April 16, 2020: IMS hosted the track's first funeral, a service for Indianapolis Metropolitan Police Department Officer Breann Leath.
- May 23, 2020: IMS hosted a mobile food drive serving thousands of residents experiencing food insecurity.
- May 30, 2020: Speedway Senior High School held its 2020 graduation ceremony at IMS due to the ability for attendees to practice social distancing due to the COVID-19 pandemic.
- March 2021: IMS hosted mass vaccination clinics in partnership with the Indiana Department of Health in response to the COVID-19 pandemic.
- May 17, 2022: Judge Tanya Walton Pratt presided over the track's first naturalization ceremony at Pagoda Plaza.
- April 8, 2024: The Speedway hosted an eclipse-viewing event in conjunction with Purdue University.
- May 23, 2025: The Speedway and Oscar Mayer host the Wienie 500, a race between six Wienermobiles, representing 6 sections of the United States.

=== Event list ===
Current

- May: IndyCar Series Indianapolis 500 & Sonsio Grand Prix, Indy NXT Grand Prix of Indianapolis, USF Pro 2000 Championship, USF2000 Championship
- June: Sportscar Vintage Racing Association Indy Legends Charity Pro–Am race, Trans-Am Series Indy SpeedTour, Formula Regional Americas Championship
- July: NASCAR Cup Series Brickyard 400, NASCAR O'Reilly Auto Parts Series Pennzoil 250
- September: IMSA SportsCar Championship IMSA Battle on the Bricks, Michelin Pilot Challenge, Porsche Carrera Cup North America, Lamborghini Super Trofeo North America, Mazda MX-5 Cup
- October: Intercontinental GT Challenge Indianapolis 8 Hour, GT World Challenge America, GT America Series, GT4 America Series, TC America Series, McLaren Trophy America, Toyota Gazoo Racing Cup North America

Future

- Ferrari Challenge North America (2000–2002, 2019–2022, 2024–2025, 2027)

Former

- Atlantic Championship Series (2017)
- F1600 Championship Series (2017)
- F2000 Championship Series (2017)
- FIM eRoad Racing World Cup (2013)
- Formula 4 United States Championship (2017)
- Formula BMW USA (2004–2007)
- Formula One
  - Indianapolis 500 (1950–1960)
  - United States Grand Prix (2000–2007)
- Grand Prix motorcycle racing
  - Indianapolis motorcycle Grand Prix (2008–2015)
- IMSA Ford Mustang Challenge (2024)
- IMSA GT3 Cup Challenge (2007)
- IndyCar Series
  - Gallagher Grand Prix (2020–2023)
- Indy Autonomous Challenge (2021, 2024)
- Indy Lights
  - Freedom 100 (2003–2019)
- International Race of Champions
  - IROC at Indy (1998–2003)
- MotoAmerica
  - MotoAmerica Superbikes at the Brickyard (2015, 2020)
- NASCAR Cup Series
  - Verizon 200 at the Brickyard (2021–2023)
- NASCAR Xfinity Series
  - Pennzoil 150 (2020–2023)
- NASCAR Winston Transcontinental Series (1994)
- Porsche Sprint Challenge North America (2021–2023)
- Porsche Supercup (2000–2006)
- Rolex Sports Car Series
  - Brickyard Grand Prix (2012–2013)
- SCCA National Championship Runoffs (2017, 2021)
- Stadium Super Trucks (2014)

== Headquarters ==
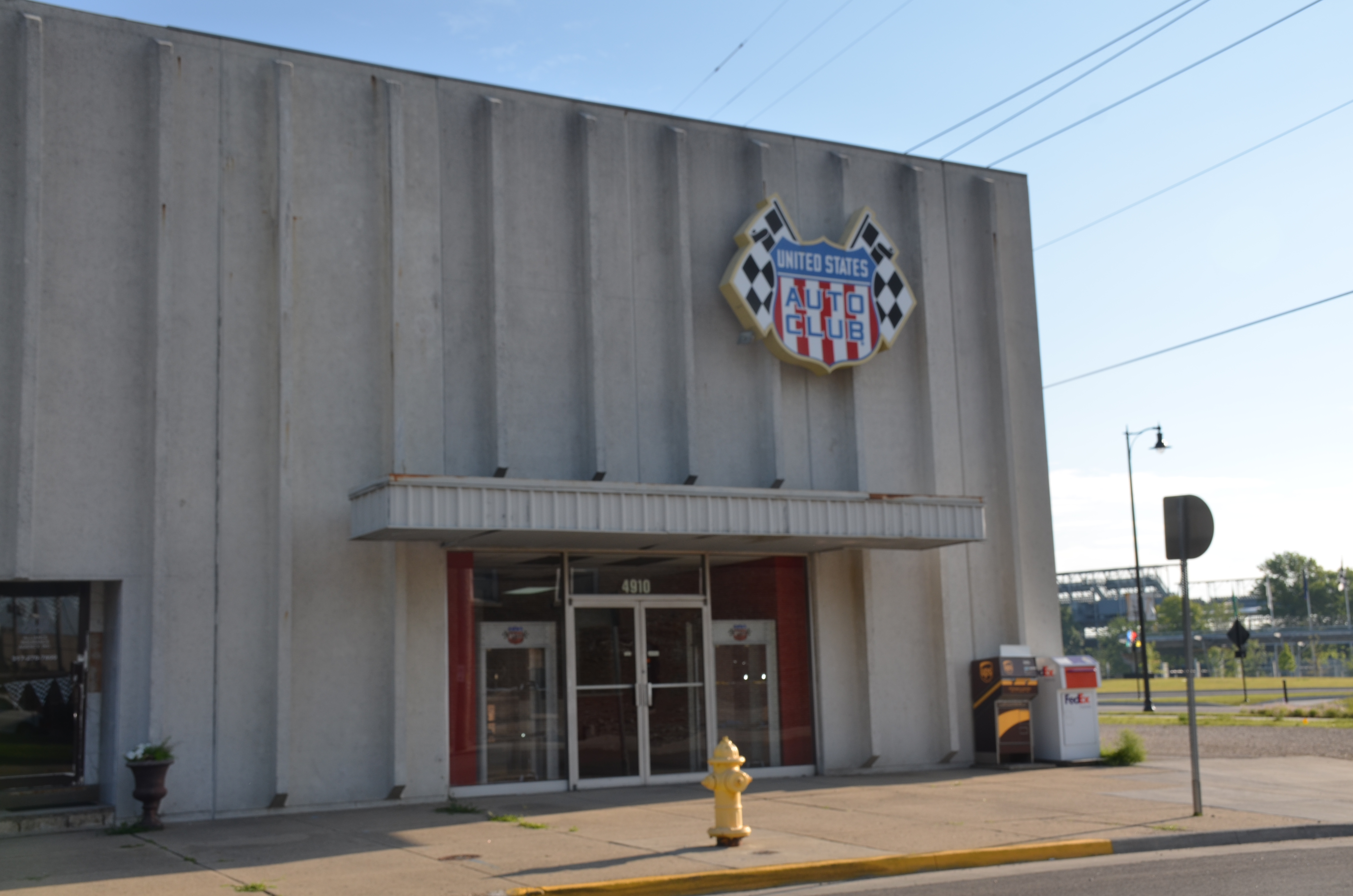
USAC headquarters in Speedway, Indiana, in 2016. The building was located on 16th Street, less than a block from the Indianapolis Motor Speedway (track is visible behind).

The opening of the Indianapolis Motor Speedway in 1909 dates back close to the birth of the sport of American Championship car racing. Since its inception, the Speedway has been metonymous within the sport. Many Indy car teams, suppliers, and constructors have been and are based in the greater Indianapolis area, some within blocks of the track. When USAC was formed in 1956, the sanctioning body's headquarters were constructed nearly across the street. The current sanctioning body, IndyCar, is headquartered in buildings directly across the street.

The track, and occasionally the headquarters, is sometimes referred to as "16th & Georgetown", owing to the track's address at the corner of 16th Street and Georgetown Road, and particularly the administration building's physical location at the corner of that intersection (which is now a roundabout).

The Speedway and the city of Indianapolis are closely tied to Indy car racing, analogous to the link NASCAR has to the greater Charlotte area. The term "Indy" and its variations synonymous with motorsports ("Indy 500", "Indy car", etc.) derive directly from the shorthand nickname ("Indy") of the city ("Indianapolis") itself.

== Records ==
=== Indianapolis 500 (IndyCar Series) ===
| Type | Distance | | | Date | Driver | Time | Average speed | |
| Type | Laps | mi. | km | Date | Driver | Time | mph | km/h |
|---|---|---|---|---|---|---|---|---|
| Practice | 1 | 2.500 | 4.023 | May 10, 1996 | (Netherlands) Arie Luyendyk | 0:37.6160 | 239.260 | 385.052 |
| Pole (First Qualifying) | 4 | 10.000 | 16.109 | May 19, 2024 | (New Zealand) Scott McLaughlin | 2:33.7017 | 234.220 | 376.940 |
| (Second Qualifying) | 1 | 2.500 | 4.023 | May 12, 1996 | (Netherlands) Arie Luyendyk | 0:37.8950 | 237.498 | 382.216 |
| (Second Qualifying) | 4 | 10.000 | 16.109 | May 12, 1996 | (Netherlands) Arie Luyendyk | 2:31.908 | 236.986 | 381.392 |
| Race | 1 | 2.500 | 4.023 | May 26, 1996 | (United States) Eddie Cheever | 0:38.119 | 236.103 | 379.971 |
| Race | 200 | 500 | 804.7 | May 30, 2021 | (Brazil) Hélio Castroneves | 2:37:19.3846 | 190.690 | 306.886 |

=== Brickyard 400 (NASCAR Cup Series) ===
| Type | Distance | Date | Driver | Time | Average speed |
|---|---|---|---|---|---|
| Qualifying (1 lap) | 2.500 mi (4.023 km) | July 26, 2014 | Kevin Harvick | 0:47.647 | 188.888 mph (303.986 km/h) |
| Race (1 lap) | 2.500 mi (4.023 km) | September 10, 2018 | Kevin Harvick | 0:48.638 | 185.041 mph (297.795 km/h) |
| Race (160 laps) | 400 mi (640 km) | August 5, 2000 | Bobby Labonte | 2:33:55.979 | 155.912 mph (250.916 km/h) |

=== United States Grand Prix (Formula One) ===
| Type | Distance | Date | Driver | Time | Average speed |
|---|---|---|---|---|---|
| Practice* (1 lap) | 2.605 mi (4.192 km) | June 19, 2004 | (Brazil) Rubens Barrichello | 1:09.454 | 135.025 mph (217.302 km/h) |
| Qualifying (1 lap) | 2.605 mi (4.192 km) | June 19, 2004 | (Brazil) Rubens Barrichello | 1:10.223 | 133.546 mph (214.921 km/h) |
| Race (1 lap) | 2.605 mi (4.192 km) | June 20, 2004 | (Brazil) Rubens Barrichello | 1:10.399 | 133.207 mph (214.376 km/h) |
| Race (73 laps) | 190.165 mi (306.041 km) | June 19, 2005 | (Germany) Michael Schumacher | 1:29:43.181 | 127.173 mph (204.665 km/h) |
* All-time track record, IMS original (2000–2007) road course

=== Grand Prix of Indianapolis (IndyCar Series) ===
| Type | Distance | Date | Driver | Time | Average speed |
|---|---|---|---|---|---|
| Practice (1 lap) | 2.439 mi (3.925 km) | May 12, 2017 | (Australia) Will Power | 1:07.7684 | 129.565 mph (208.515 km/h) |
| Qualifying* (1 lap) | 2.439 mi (3.925 km) | May 12, 2017 | (Australia) Will Power | 1:07.7044 | 129.687 mph (208.711 km/h) |
| Race (1 lap) | 2.439 mi (3.925 km) | May 13, 2017 | (United States) Josef Newgarden | 1:09.3888 | 126.539 mph (203.645 km/h) |
| Race (85 laps) | 207.315 mi (333.641 km) | May 13, 2017 | (Australia) Will Power | 1:42:57.6108 | 120.813 mph (194.430 km/h) |
* All-time track record, IMS reconfigured (2014) road course

=== Race lap records ===
As of October 2026, the fastest official race lap records at the Indianapolis Motor Speedway are listed as:

| Category | Time | Driver | Vehicle | Event |
Speedway (1909–present): 2.500 mi (4.023 km)
| IndyCar | 0:38.119 | (United States) Eddie Cheever | Lola T95/00 | 1996 Indianapolis 500 |
| CART | 0:39.281 | (United States) Michael Andretti | Lola T92/00 | 1992 Indianapolis 500 |
| Indy Lights | 0:45.4307 | (Uruguay) Santiago Urrutia | Dallara IL-15 | 2017 Freedom 100 |
| NASCAR Cup | 0:48.638 | (United States) Kevin Harvick | Ford Fusion | 2018 Brickyard 400 |
| NASCAR Xfinity | 0:52.878 | (United States) Tyler Reddick | Chevrolet Camaro SS | 2018 Lilly Diabetes 250 |
Dirt Track (2018–present): 0.200 mi (0.322 km)
| USAC National Midget Championship | 0:12.398 | (United States) Mitchel Moles | USAC Midget | 2025 BC39 |
Current Grand Prix Circuit (2014–present): 2.439 mi (3.925 km)
| IndyCar | 1:09.3888 | (United States) Josef Newgarden | Dallara DW12 | 2017 IndyCar Grand Prix |
| LMDh | 1:15.524 | (Australia) Matt Campbell | Porsche 963 | 2023 IMSA Battle on the Bricks |
| Indy Lights | 1:15.6953 | (United States) Oliver Askew | Dallara IL-15 | 2019 Indy Lights Grand Prix |
| LMP2 | 1:16.619 | (Denmark) Mikkel Jensen | Oreca 07 | 2023 IMSA Battle on the Bricks |
| LMH | 1:17.020 | (United Kingdom) Ross Gunn | Aston Martin Valkyrie AMR-LMH | 2026 IMSA Battle on the Bricks |
| Indy Pro 2000 | 1:19.3332 | (United States) Kyle Kirkwood | Tatuus PM-18 | 2019 Indy Pro 2000 Grand Prix of Indianapolis |
| DP | 1:19.550 | (United Kingdom) Ryan Dalziel | Riley MkXXVI | 2014 Brickyard Grand Prix |
| LMPC | 1:21.087 | (United Kingdom) Jack Hawksworth | Oreca FLM09 | 2014 Brickyard Grand Prix |
| LMP3 | 1:21.420 | (United Kingdom) Wayne Boyd | Duqueine D-08 | 2023 IMSA Battle on the Bricks |
| Formula Atlantic | 1:21.999 | (United States) Keith Grant | Swift 016.a | 2017 Indianapolis Atlantic Championship round |
| GT3 | 1:22.439 | (Switzerland) Raffaele Marciello | Mercedes-AMG GT3 Evo | 2022 Indianapolis 8 Hours |
| Formula Regional | 1:22.611 | (Chile) Nicolás Ambiado | Ligier JS F3 | 2025 Indianapolis FR Americas round |
| LM GTE | 1:23.248 | (Italy) Giancarlo Fisichella | Ferrari 458 Italia GT2 | 2014 Brickyard Grand Prix |
| TA1 | 1:23.932 | (United States) Matthew Brabham | Ford Mustang Trans-Am | 2026 Indianapolis Trans-Am round |
| Ferrari Challenge | 1:24.561 | (United States) Massimo Perrina | Ferrari 296 Challenge | 2025 Indianapolis Ferrari Challenge North America round |
| US F2000 | 1:24.7440 | (United States) Braden Eves | Tatuus USF-17 | 2019 USF2000 Grand Prix of Indianapolis |
| Lamborghini Super Trofeo | 1:24.758 | (Costa Rica) Danny Formal | Lamborghini Huracán Super Trofeo Evo2 | 2025 Indianapolis Lamborghini Super Trofeo North America round |
| SRO GT2 | 1:25.317 | (Republic of Ireland) Peter Dempsey | Maserati MC20 GT2 | 2026 Indianapolis GT America round |
| Porsche Carrera Cup | 1:25.428 | (United States) Aaron Jeansonne | Porsche 911 (992 II) Cup | 2026 Indianapolis Porsche Carrera Cup North America round |
| McLaren Trophy | 1:26.125 | (United States) Paul Holton | McLaren Artura Trophy | 2026 Indianapolis McLaren Trophy America round |
| TA2 | 1:28.748 | (United States) Ethan Tovo | Toyota Camry Trans-Am | 2026 Indianapolis Trans-Am round |
| NASCAR Cup | 1:29.168 | (United States) Chase Elliott | Chevrolet Camaro ZL1 | 2023 Verizon 200 at the Brickyard |
| GT4 | 1:30.035 | (Canada) Jesse Lazare | McLaren Artura GT4 | 2023 Indianapolis Motor Speedway 240 |
| NASCAR Xfinity | 1:30.522 | (United States) Austin Cindric | Ford Mustang GT NASCAR | 2020 Pennzoil 150 |
| Formula 2000 | 1:30.535 | (United States) John LaRue | Citation F2000 | 2017 Indianapolis F2000 Championship round |
| Formula 4 | 1:31.331 | (United States) Kyle Kirkwood | Crawford F4-16 | 2017 Indianapolis F4 United States round |
| TCR Touring Car | 1:31.473 | (United States) Tyler Gonzalez | CUPRA León VZ TCR | 2025 Indianapolis Motor Speedway 120 |
| Mustang Challenge | 1:34.927 | (United States) Tyler Maxson | Ford Mustang Dark Horse R | 2024 Indianapolis Mustang Challenge round |
| Formula 1600 | 1:35.031 | (United States) David Osborne | Mygale SJ 2012 | 2017 Indianapolis F1600 Championship round |
| Toyota GR Cup | 1:39.366 | (United States) Spike Kohlbecker | Toyota GR86 | 2026 Indianapolis Toyota GR Cup North America round |
| Mazda MX-5 Cup | 1:40.749 | (United States) Parker DeLong | Mazda MX-5 (ND) | 2026 Indianapolis Mazda MX-5 Cup round |
Hybrid Grand Prix (SCCA Runoffs) Circuit (2014–present): 2.589 mi (4.167 km)
| Formula Atlantic | 1:30.650 | (United States) James French | Ralt RT41 | 2021 SCCA National Championship Runoffs Formula Atlantic round |
| GT3 | 1:34.089 | (Italy) Alessandro Pier Guidi | Ferrari 488 GT3 Evo 2020 | 2021 Indianapolis 8 Hours |
| Porsche Carrera Cup | 1:37.294 | (Canada) Parker Thompson | Porsche 911 (992 I) GT3 Cup | 2021 Indianapolis Porsche Carrera Cup North America round |
| SRO GT2 | 1:40.519 | (United States) Elias Sabo | Audi R8 LMS GT2 | 2021 Indianapolis GT America round |
| GT4 | 1:42.675 | (United States) Andrew Davis | Aston Martin Vantage GT4 | 2021 Indianapolis 8 Hours |
| Formula 4 | 1:44.967 | (United States) Nathan Byrd | Mygale M14-F4 | 2021 Indianapolis Skip Barber Formula Series round |
| TCX | 1:48.351 | (United States) Jacob Ruud | BMW M2 ClubSport Racing | 2021 Indianapolis TC America Series round |
| Spec Miata | 1:58.837 | (United States) Brian Henderson | Mazda Miata | 2021 SCCA National Championship Runoffs Spec Miata round |
Modified Motorcycle Circuit (2014–present): 2.591 mi (4.170 km)
| MotoGP | 1:32.625 | (Spain) Marc Márquez | Honda RC213V | 2015 Indianapolis motorcycle Grand Prix |
| Superbike | 1:36.825 | (Italy) Lorenzo Zanetti | Ducati Panigale V4 R | 2020 Indianapolis MotoAmerica Superbike round |
| Moto2 | 1:37.275 | (Finland) Mika Kallio | Kalex Moto2 | 2014 Indianapolis motorcycle Grand Prix |
| Supersport | 1:40.064 | (United States) Joe Roberts | Yamaha YZF-R6 | 2015 Indianapolis MotoAmerica Supersport round |
| Moto3 | 1:40.800 | (Spain) Álex Rins | Honda NSF250RW | 2014 Indianapolis motorcycle Grand Prix |
| Twins Cup | 1:45.144 | (United States) Rocco Landers | Suzuki SV650 | 2020 Indianapolis MotoAmerica Twins Cup round |
| Supersport 300 | 1:50.489 | (United States) Rocco Landers | Kawasaki Ninja 400 | 2020 Indianapolis MotoAmerica Junior Cup round |
Modified Grand Prix Road Course (2008–2013): 2.534 mi (4.078 km)
| DP | 1:22.191 | (United States) Scott Pruett | Riley MkXXVI | 2013 Brickyard Grand Prix |
| Porsche Carrera Cup | 1:28.858 | (United States) Patrick Long | Porsche 911 (997) GT3 Cup | 2013 Brickyard Grand Prix |
| Group GX | 1:33.999 | (United States) Joel Miller | Mazda6 GX (Prep 2) | 2013 Brickyard Grand Prix |
Original Motorcycle Circuit (2008–2013): 2.621 mi (4.218 km)
| MotoGP | 1:39.044 | (Spain) Marc Márquez | Honda RC213V | 2013 Indianapolis motorcycle Grand Prix |
| Moto2 | 1:43.304 | (Spain) Marc Márquez | Suter MMXII | 2012 Indianapolis motorcycle Grand Prix |
| 250cc | 1:44.720 | (Italy) Marco Simoncelli | Gilera RSA 250 | 2009 Indianapolis motorcycle Grand Prix |
| Moto3 | 1:47.433 | (Spain) Maverick Viñales | KTM RC250GP | 2013 Indianapolis motorcycle Grand Prix |
| 125cc | 1:48.380 | (Spain) Nicolás Terol | Aprilia RSA 125 | 2011 Indianapolis motorcycle Grand Prix |
Original Grand Prix Circuit (2000–2007): 2.605 mi (4.192 km)
| Formula One | 1:10.399 | (Brazil) Rubens Barrichello | Ferrari F2004 | 2004 United States Grand Prix |
| Indy Pro Series | 1:25.911 | (United States) Marco Andretti | Dallara IPS | 2005 Grand Prix of Indianapolis |
| Porsche Carrera Cup | 1:35.723 | (Belgium) David Saelens | Porsche 911 (997) GT3 Cup | 2005 2nd Indianapolis Porsche Supercup round |
| Formula BMW | 1:37.082 | (United States) Matt Jaskol | Mygale FB02 | 2004 Indianapolis Formula BMW USA round |
| Ferrari Challenge | 1:53.763 | (United States) Lewis Bakes | Ferrari 360 Challenge | 2000 Indianapolis Ferrari Challenge North America round |

=== Seats ===
In 2004, The Indianapolis Star journalist Curt Cavin counted 257,325 seats, a world record. The number of seats was reduced to an estimated 235,000 in 2013.

== Oval dimensions ==
| Region | Number | Distance | Width | Banking |
|---|---|---|---|---|
| Long straightaways | 2 | 0.625 mi (1.006 km) each | 50 ft (15 m) | 0° |
| Short straightaways | 2 | 0.125 mi (0.201 km) each | 50 ft (15 m) | 0° |
| Turns | 4 | 0.259 mi (0.417 km) each | 60 ft (18 m) | 9°12' |
| Total/average | | 2.500 mi (4.023 km) | 55 ft (17 m) | 3°3' |

== Weather and climate ==
Indianapolis Motor Speedway has a transitional climate with influences of both subtropical and continental. The nearest official weather station is at the Indianapolis International Airport, located just a few miles from the speedway.

Due to the cold winters, including snow on the track, Indy 500 testing is often impossible during winter months. During the main event in late May, the local climate is transitioning from spring to summer. May is the rainiest month of the year, which makes rain delays a large risk during various parts of the event. Ambient temperatures on average for the month is in the lower 70s Fahrenheit/lower 20s Celsius, with temperatures in the 80s not being uncommon later in the month when the race takes place.

For the Brickyard 400 in the summer, the track is much more prone to heatwaves, with the wet season carrying on into July as well.

The defunct Formula One and MotoGP roval infield road course events ran in June/September and August respectively. Since oval racing is not conducted in wet conditions, the inaugural Formula One Grand Prix became the track's first race under wet conditions, using the oval's Turn 1 in a reverse direction with rain tires. The IndyCar Grand Prix, which is usually run two weeks before the 500, is the main existing road course event and can be run in wet conditions, as can the autumnal race events in September and October, the 6 Hours of Indianapolis for IMSA and the 8 Hours of Indianapolis for the Intercontinental GT Challenge.

Climate data for Indianapolis (Indianapolis International Airport), 1991–2020 normals, (Note: Mean monthly maxima and minima (i.e. the expected highest and lowest temperature readings at any point during the year or given month) calculated based on data at said location from 1991 to 2020.) extremes 1871–present (Note: Official records for Indianapolis kept at downtown from February 1871 to December 1942, and at Indianapolis Int'l since January 1943. For more information, see Threadex)
| Month | Jan | Feb | Mar | Apr | May | Jun | Jul | Aug | Sep | Oct | Nov | Dec | Year |
|---|---|---|---|---|---|---|---|---|---|---|---|---|---|
| Record high °F (°C) | 71 (22) | 77 (25) | 88 (31) | 90 (32) | 96 (36) | 104 (40) | 106 (41) | 103 (39) | 100 (38) | 92 (33) | 81 (27) | 74 (23) | 106 (41) |
| Mean maximum °F (°C) | 58.8 (14.9) | 64.4 (18.0) | 74.0 (23.3) | 80.8 (27.1) | 87.1 (30.6) | 91.9 (33.3) | 93.4 (34.1) | 92.6 (33.7) | 90.7 (32.6) | 82.8 (28.2) | 70.5 (21.4) | 61.7 (16.5) | 94.9 (34.9) |
| Mean daily maximum °F (°C) | 36.1 (2.3) | 40.8 (4.9) | 51.9 (11.1) | 63.9 (17.7) | 73.4 (23.0) | 82.0 (27.8) | 85.2 (29.6) | 84.3 (29.1) | 78.2 (25.7) | 65.6 (18.7) | 51.8 (11.0) | 40.4 (4.7) | 62.8 (17.1) |
| Daily mean °F (°C) | 28.5 (−1.9) | 32.5 (0.3) | 42.4 (5.8) | 53.6 (12.0) | 63.6 (17.6) | 72.5 (22.5) | 75.8 (24.3) | 74.7 (23.7) | 67.8 (19.9) | 55.5 (13.1) | 43.3 (6.3) | 33.3 (0.7) | 53.6 (12.0) |
| Mean daily minimum °F (°C) | 20.9 (−6.2) | 24.2 (−4.3) | 33.0 (0.6) | 43.3 (6.3) | 53.7 (12.1) | 62.9 (17.2) | 66.4 (19.1) | 65.0 (18.3) | 57.4 (14.1) | 45.5 (7.5) | 34.9 (1.6) | 26.2 (−3.2) | 44.4 (6.9) |
| Mean minimum °F (°C) | −2.1 (−18.9) | 4.8 (−15.1) | 14.9 (−9.5) | 27.2 (−2.7) | 37.8 (3.2) | 49.2 (9.6) | 56.1 (13.4) | 55.1 (12.8) | 43.1 (6.2) | 30.2 (−1.0) | 19.6 (−6.9) | 6.8 (−14.0) | −4.9 (−20.5) |
| Record low °F (°C) | −27 (−33) | −21 (−29) | −7 (−22) | 18 (−8) | 27 (−3) | 37 (3) | 46 (8) | 41 (5) | 30 (−1) | 20 (−7) | −5 (−21) | −23 (−31) | −27 (−33) |
| Average precipitation inches (mm) | 3.12 (79) | 2.43 (62) | 3.69 (94) | 4.34 (110) | 4.75 (121) | 4.95 (126) | 4.42 (112) | 3.20 (81) | 3.14 (80) | 3.22 (82) | 3.45 (88) | 2.92 (74) | 43.63 (1,108) |
| Average snowfall inches (cm) | 8.8 (22) | 6.0 (15) | 3.2 (8.1) | 0.2 (0.51) | 0.0 (0.0) | 0.0 (0.0) | 0.0 (0.0) | 0.0 (0.0) | 0.0 (0.0) | 0.1 (0.25) | 0.8 (2.0) | 6.4 (16) | 25.5 (65) |
| Average extreme snow depth inches (cm) | 5.0 (13) | 3.6 (9.1) | 2.3 (5.8) | 0.1 (0.25) | 0.0 (0.0) | 0.0 (0.0) | 0.0 (0.0) | 0.0 (0.0) | 0.0 (0.0) | 0.0 (0.0) | 0.3 (0.76) | 3.4 (8.6) | 7.3 (19) |
| Average precipitation days (≥ 0.01 in) | 12.3 | 10.3 | 11.5 | 11.9 | 13.3 | 11.5 | 10.3 | 8.3 | 7.9 | 8.9 | 10.2 | 11.8 | 128.2 |
| Average snowy days (≥ 0.1 in) | 7.0 | 5.8 | 2.4 | 0.3 | 0.0 | 0.0 | 0.0 | 0.0 | 0.0 | 0.1 | 1.2 | 5.6 | 22.4 |
| Average relative humidity (%) | 75.0 | 73.6 | 69.9 | 65.6 | 67.1 | 68.4 | 72.8 | 75.4 | 74.4 | 71.6 | 75.5 | 78.0 | 72.3 |
| Average dew point °F (°C) | 18.1 (−7.7) | 21.6 (−5.8) | 30.9 (−0.6) | 39.7 (4.3) | 50.5 (10.3) | 59.9 (15.5) | 64.9 (18.3) | 63.7 (17.6) | 56.7 (13.7) | 44.1 (6.7) | 34.9 (1.6) | 24.4 (−4.2) | 42.4 (5.8) |
| Mean monthly sunshine hours | 132.1 | 145.7 | 178.3 | 214.8 | 264.7 | 287.2 | 295.2 | 273.7 | 232.6 | 196.6 | 117.1 | 102.4 | 2,440.4 |
| Percentage possible sunshine | 44 | 49 | 48 | 54 | 59 | 64 | 65 | 64 | 62 | 57 | 39 | 35 | 55 |
| Average ultraviolet index | 2 | 3 | 4 | 6 | 8 | 9 | 9 | 8 | 6 | 4 | 2 | 2 | 5 |
Source 1: NOAA (relative humidity, dew point, and sun 1961–1990
Source 2: Weather Atlas (UV)

== See also ==
- Donald Davidson – historian of the Indianapolis Motor Speedway
- Ron McQueeney – former IMS Director of Photography from 1977 until 2011
- List of fatalities at the Indianapolis Motor Speedway
- List of attractions and events in Indianapolis
- List of auto racing tracks in the United States
- List of motor racing venues by capacity
- List of IndyCar Series racetracks
- List of NASCAR tracks
- List of National Historic Landmarks in Indiana
- National Register of Historic Places listings in Marion County, Indiana
