= Napeague State Park =

State park in Suffolk County, New York

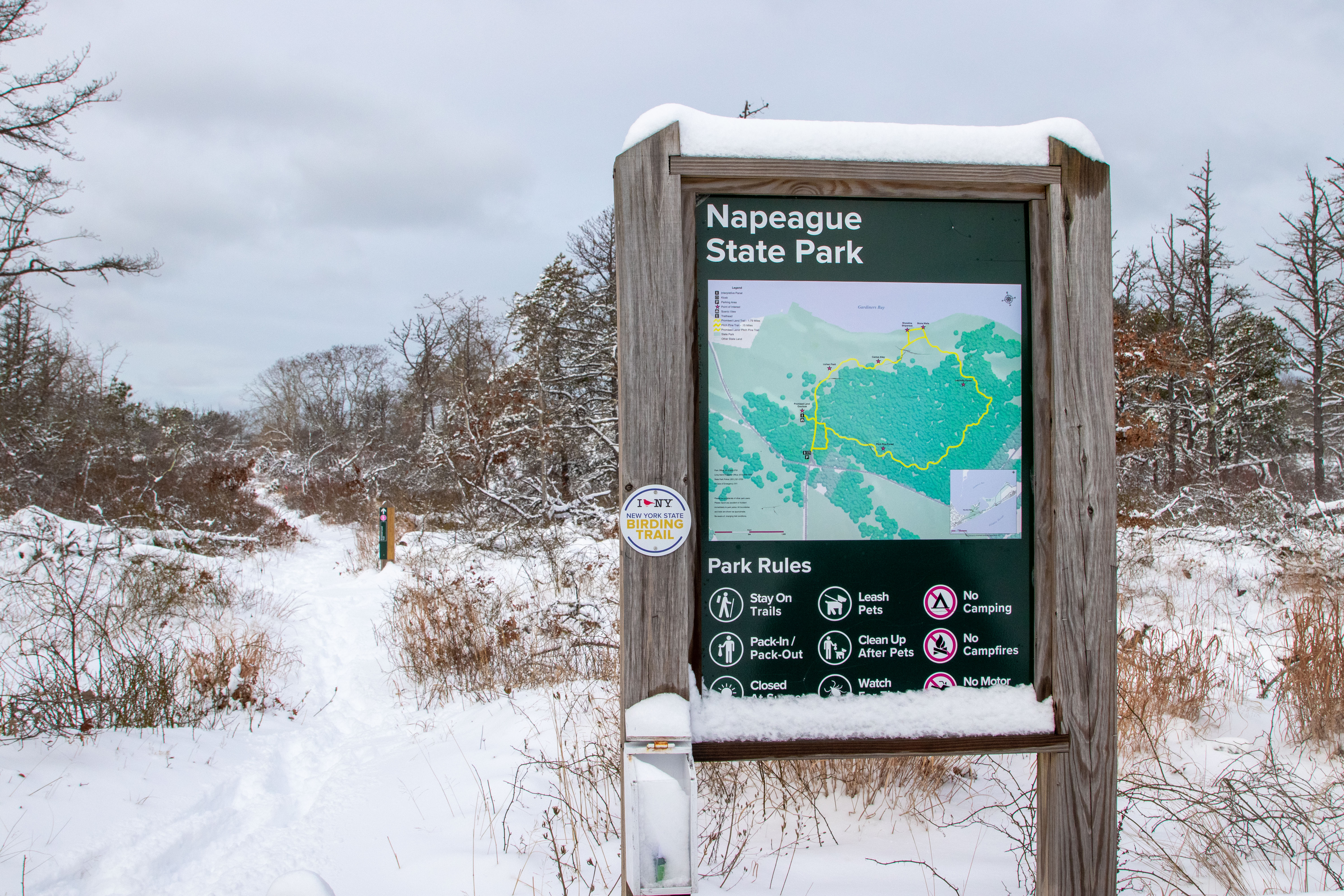
- Napeague State Park entrance in 2025

- Location within New York
- Type: State park (undeveloped)
- Location: Town of East Hampton; Suffolk County, New York
- Coordinates: 40°59′23″N 72°04′37″W
- Area: 1,364 acres (5.52 km^{2})
- Operator: New York State Office of Parks, Recreation and Historic Preservation
- Visitors: 100,652 (in 2024)
- Open: Year Round

Napeague State Park is a 1,364-acre (5.52 km^{2}) state park in the town of East Hampton in Suffolk County, New York. The largely undeveloped park stretches across the entire narrow width of the South Fork of Long Island from the Atlantic Ocean to Gardiners Bay and Block Island Sound. The park is located on either side of the Montauk Highway (New York Route 27) on the "Napeague Stretch" between Amagansett and Montauk. The hamlet of Napeague is located on the park's edge.

== History ==
Napeague State Park's land was initially purchased by the Nature Conservancy in 1976 and conveyed to New York State in 1978. It consists mostly of wetlands in areas where waves washed over Long Island during the Great Hurricane of 1938.

Napeague was the location of the crash of American Airlines Flight 1502 in 1961, resulting in the deaths of 6 aboard.

== Description ==
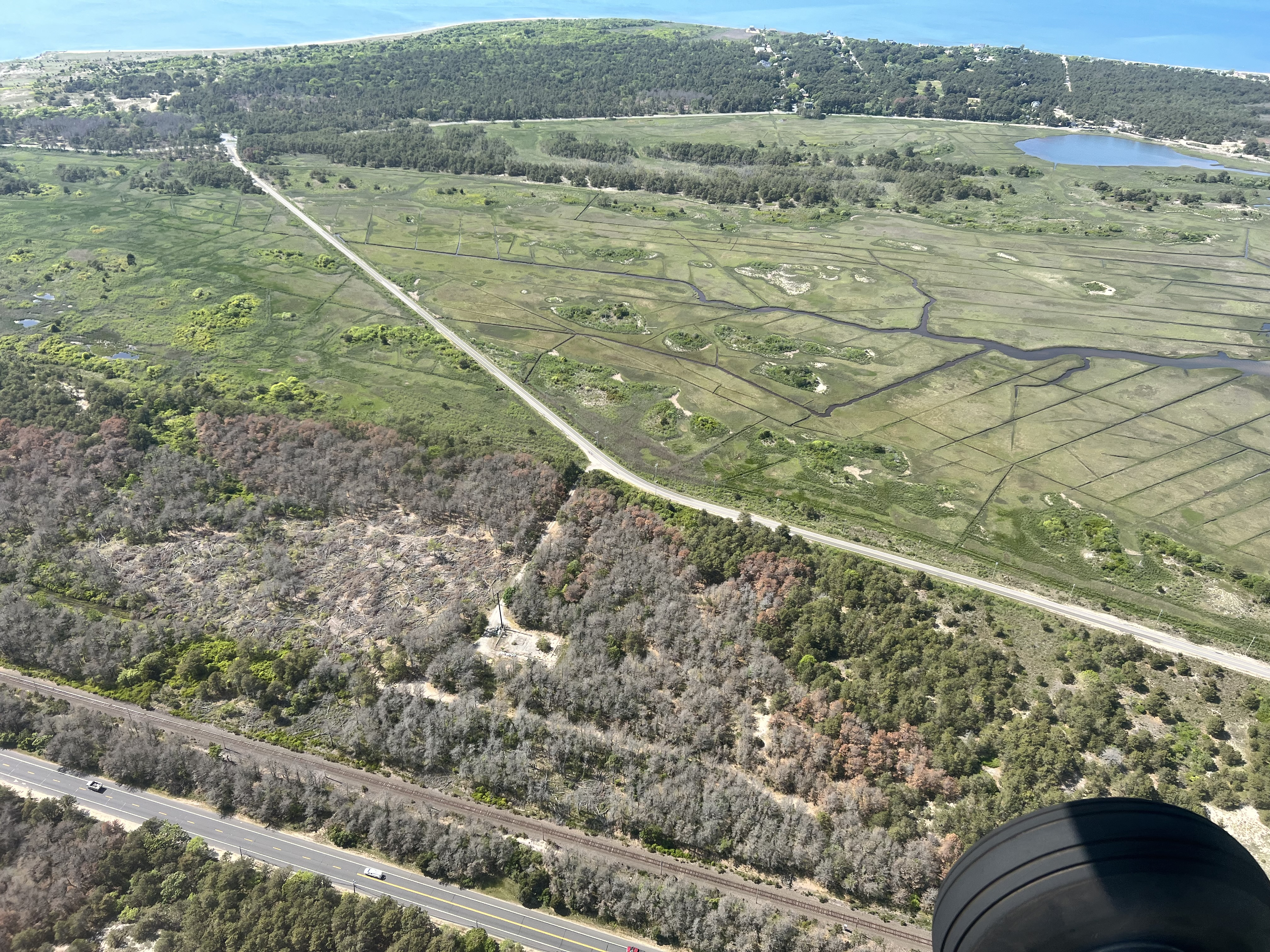
Aerial view of Napeague State Park in 2023

There is virtually no infrastructure or permitted camping at the park, which is administered by nearby Hither Hills State Park. Its most distinguishing natural feature, a pristine Atlantic Ocean beach, is usually closed during the summer because the endangered piping plover nests near the beach.

A landmark within the park is the huge abandoned Smith Meal fish factory in an area on Gardiners Bay called Promised Land. A controversy rages after Cross Sound Ferry said it wanted to start ferry service from the Promised Land terminal across Long Island Sound to New London, Connecticut. There is currently no service connecting the South Fork of Long Island to Connecticut and its Foxwoods and Mohegan Sun casinos. The only ferry service on the east end of Long Island goes from Orient Point on the North Fork and North Fork residents said this creates traffic jams on its two-lane roads. The Town of East Hampton has so far successfully fought any proposal to start ferry service there.

== Southern Pine Beetle Infestation ==
Pitch pine trees in the park have been devastated by an infestation of the Southern pine beetle, which was first found on Long Island in 2014. These pine trees are part of a unique and imperiled maritime pitch pine dune woodland. The beetle infestation has killed a large percentage of these pine trees in Napeague State Park as well as many trees in other areas of East Hampton. Due to fire concerns from all the standing dead timber, the New York State Office of Parks, Recreation and Historic Preservation has created fuel breaks and fire access roads.

== See also ==
- List of New York state parks
