= Montauk Airport =

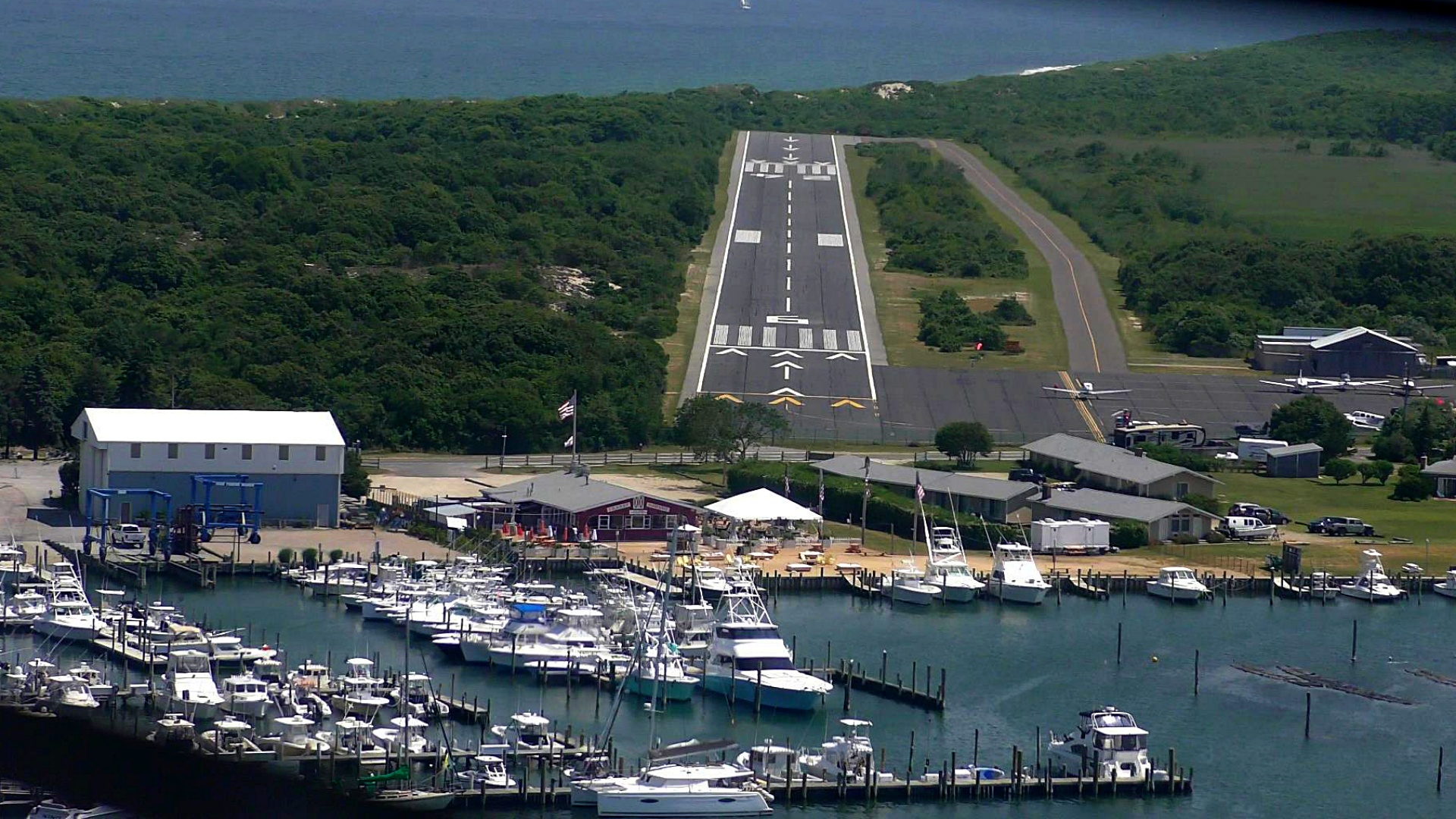

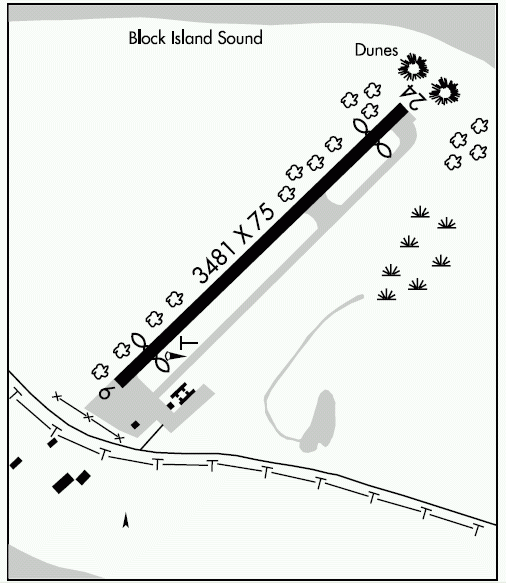
- IATA: MTP; ICAO: KMTP; FAA LID: MTP

Summary
- Airport type: Public
- Owner: Montauk Airport Inc
- Serves: Montauk, New York
- Elevation AMSL: 7 ft (2.1 m)
- Coordinates: 41°04′36″N 071°55′14″W
- Website: montaukairport.com

Map
- Interactive map of Montauk Airport

Runways
Direction	Length		Surface
Direction	ft	m	Surface
6/24	3,246	989	Asphalt

Statistics (2010)
- Aircraft operations: 30,361
- Based aircraft: 12
- Source: Federal Aviation Administration

Montauk Airport (IATA: MTP, ICAO: KMTP, FAA LID: MTP) is a privately owned, public use airport located three nautical miles (6 km) northeast of the central business district of Montauk, in Suffolk County, New York, United States. It is included in the National Plan of Integrated Airport Systems for 2011–2015, which categorized it as a reliever airport.

The airport is located on East Lake Drive between Lake Montauk and Block Island Sound. It is the easternmost airport in New York State.

== History ==
Montauk Airport was constructed in 1957 to improve access to the East End community, which was being developed as a summer resort. Perry Duryea Jr., a former pilot of the Naval Air Transport Service, was one of the early partners of the corporation that developed the airport, and often piloted his own plane between Montauk and Albany while serving as a member of the New York State Assembly. The following year, regular flights were proposed between Montauk and LaGuardia Airport in New York City during the summer season for use by vacationers and sport fishermen.

In 1961 there was attempt by Suffolk County to buy the airport and turn it into a county airport, but the plans ultimately failed.

The small airport has been used by various celebrities visiting the Hamptons including Mick Jagger who was inspired to write a 1976 song Memory Motel based on an actual Montauk motel. He and Bianca Jagger had been staying at Eothen, the estate of Andy Warhol in Montauk. Other celebrities spotted at the airport included Sarah Ferguson, Nicole Kidman, Robert De Niro, Jimmy Buffett, Ray Charles, Aretha Franklin and Lou Reed.

In 2007, Montauk Airport received two grants from the Federal Aviation Administration to install an Automated Weather Observing System to provide pilots with current weather conditions at the airport and a Precision Approach Path Indicator to visually alert pilots if they are on the glidepath while preparing to land. An additional grant was received from the FAA in 2008 to install taxiway edge lights.

The airport was bought by a new (undisclosed) buyer on June 14, 2022. East Hampton Town earlier had expressed interest in buying the airport. In July 2012 the airport was listed as for sale by descendants of the original owners including Duryea's son Chip with Douglas Elliman Real Estate agents Paul Brennan and Ronald White. The price of the property is $18 million.

East Hampton town (which owns the much bigger East Hampton Airport 15 miles west of the Montauk airport), Suffolk County, and the State of New York have all said they do not have the funds to buy the airport. They have said the airport would be legally required to remain an airport until 2019 since it had received an FAA grant in 2009. Under zoning requirements, it could be divided into six residential lots.

== Facilities and aircraft ==
Montauk Airport covers an area of 40 acres (16 ha) at an elevation of 7 feet (2 m) above mean sea level. It has one runway designated 6/24 with an asphalt surface measuring 3,246 by 75 feet (989 x 23 m).

For the 12-month period ending September 10, 2010, the airport had 30,361 aircraft operations, an average of 83 per day: 83.5% general aviation and 16.5% air taxi. At that time there were 12 aircraft based at this airport: 75% single-engine and 25% multi-engine.

== Airlines and destinations ==
Airlines	Destinations
Blade	Seasonal: New York–Skyport

== Accidents and incidents ==
- On March 7, 2009, a Cirrus SR22 went off the runway and burst into flames while practicing a takeoff from the Montauk Airport. The student pilot and instructor escaped from the aircraft without injuries.
- On July 31, 2007, a Piper PA-28-181 crashed into trees at the Montauk Airport after aborting a landing and attempting a go-around. The pilot was uninjured and rescued by an airport employee and two people from a nearby beach.
- On July 7, 2003, a Piper PA-34-200T crashed into the waters of Big Reed Pond in Montauk County Park after taking off from the Montauk Airport, killing the pilot and two passengers. The men had gone out earlier in the evening on a fishing trip for striped bass and were flying back to Republic Airport during the middle of the night. The plane was discovered the next morning by a family canoeing in the pond.

== See also ==
- List of airports in New York
