= Eothen (Warhol estate) =

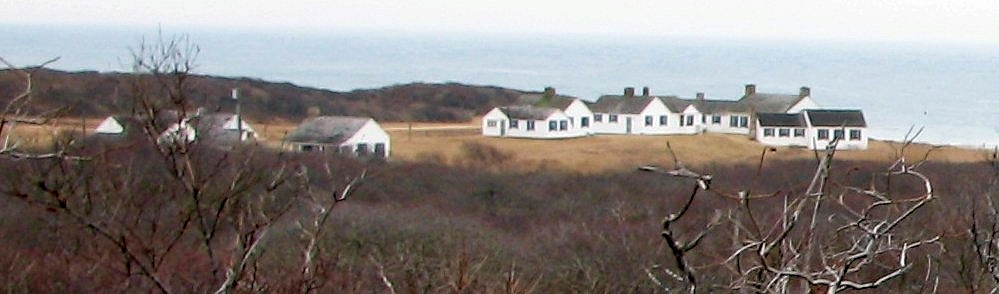
- Interactive map of the Eothen area
- Former names: The Church Estate
- Alternative names: Warhol Estate

General information
- Location: 16 Cliff Dr, Montauk, New York, U.S.
- Coordinates: 41.0461°N 71.8936°W
- Year built: 1931
- Owner: Adam Lindemann

Design and construction
- Architect: Rolf W. Bauhan

Eothen is an oceanfront property in Montauk, New York, on the easternmost tip of Long Island. The compound was originally made up of five white clapboard houses built on 20 acres (8 ha) of land in the 1930s. It was known locally as The Church Estate after the owners before pop artist Andy Warhol and his film collaborator Paul Morrissey purchased the property in 1971. Warhol entertained many famous guests, including Jackie Kennedy, The Rolling Stones, Elizabeth Taylor, Liza Minnelli, and Halston.

In 1992, 15 acres (6.1 ha) of land was donated to the Nature Conservancy, which is now called the Andy Warhol Preserve. In 2007, businessman Mickey Drexler purchased the 5.7-acre (2.3 ha) property and merged it with a neighboring 24-acre (9.7 ha) horse farm. In 2015, gallerist Adam Lindemann purchased the property without the horse farm.

== Background ==
In 1898, Richard E. Church of the Arm & Hammer baking soda family purchased property in the Montauk Moorlands from Arthur Benson, who owned most of Montauk. A seasonal fishing cottage was constructed in 1905. The single cottage was replaced with five white Colonial Revival-style cottages designed by Rolf W. Bauhan in 1931. The Church family used the property as a fishing camp for a few weeks in September when the striped bass fishing was at its peak.

== Residence of Andy Warhol ==
Pop artist Andy Warhol and his film collaborator Paul Morrissey purchased the property for $225,000 in 1971. According to Morrissey, the Church family called the property Eothen, which is Greek for "from the East" or "from the dawn."

In addition to serving as the residence of Mr. Winters, the caretaker, the property comprised a main five-bedroom lodge-style house, four cottages, a stable, and a three-car garage, all situated at the end of a long, winding private drive. There was a guest ranch nearby where horses could be rented to ride to the white sand beaches over the dunes. About half a mile to the west, in the direction of Montauk Village, lived talk-show host Dick Cavett and his actress wife, Carrie Nye. Near the Coast Guard facility at Montauk Point, a half mile to the east, was a bungalow owned by photographer Peter Beard. As Bob Colacello, former editor of Warhol's Interview magazine, noted, Eothen was "the Factory answer to Hyannisport," the Kennedy Compound in Hyannis Port, Massachusetts on Cape Cod.

Because the mile-long dirt driveway required extensive infrastructure that frequently failed in winter, creating constant maintenance costs, Warhol rented out the main house to offset expenses. The other cottages were usually occupied by people in Warhol's inner circle. "We, people like Andy's boyfriend Jed Johnson, and Bob Colacello, stayed in the other two cottages. So did Tom Cashin and Jed's brother Jay," said Vincent Fremont, who was in charge of the sleeping arrangements. When they weren't renting the main house, Fremont would go to the farmers' market in the neighboring town of Amagansett, New York to buy food for their weekend visitors.

Socialite Lee Radziwill was the first to rent the main house during the summer of 1972. Colacello recalled, "Jackie Kennedy Onassis's sister, Lee Radziwill, had rented the largest of the five houses-five bedrooms, high-ceilinged living room, and cozy, old-fashioned kitchen. (The others were usually inhabited, in descending order, by Paul, Andy and Jed, Fred, and the caretaker and his wife.) Jackie (and her children, Caroline and John-John) had visited Lee (and her children, Anthony and Tina) several times that summer, and Andy loved to joke about putting up 'gold plaques' that said 'Lee slept here' and 'Jackie slept here.' Radziwill was also accompanied by a maid and a cook. For Warhol's 44th birthday in August 1972, she gifted him a flagpole that still stands today. Filmmaker Jonas Mekas captured Radziwill's vacation with her family at Eothen. Jackie Kennedy Onassis hired him to teach her children filmmaking and photography. Footage from their stay is included in the documentary That Summer (2017). Radziwill also rented the house during the following summer in 1973.

During The Rolling Stones American Tour 1972, rock musician Mick Jagger and his wife Bianca Jagger stayed with Radziwill in the main home to unwind. Writer Truman Capote, another frequent visitor, and Peter Beard, whom Mick Jagger had hired to accompany the Rolling Stones on tour, became good friends. In 1975, the Rolling Stones rented the main house as a rehearsal space. Jagger also rented the main house in 1976 and 1977.

Guests who stayed at Eothon in the mid-1970s include musician John Phillips and his wife Genevieve Waite, as well as actress Elizabeth Taylor.

In a June 5, 1977 entry in The Andy Warhol Diaries, Warhol stated: "We're trying to rent the main house for $4,000 a month during July and August — $26,000 for six months. Two thousand a month for the small cottages, but we'll deal."

Warhol made a cameo in the Ulli Lommel-directed film Cocaine Cowboy (1979), which was shot at Eothen in 1978.

In 1978, Fashion designer Halston began renting the main house at the suggestion of his boyfriend Victor Hugo. He had a mosquito-net cover put over the bed in his bedroom and he requested that a Vulcan professional stove be installed in the kitchen. He continued to rent the main house into the 1980s. In a diary entry on July 15, 1986, Warhol said they were "not making any money off renting it to Halston, it just pays the mortgage."

=== The Andy Warhol Preserve ===
In 1992, Andy Warhol's estate donated 15 acres (6.1 ha) of the land to The Nature Conservancy. The bequest was made to support the visual arts and conserve a portion of the Montauk Moorlands. As part of the gift, the Conservancy created the Andy Warhol Preserve and established an educational nature trail for visitors.

== Later history ==
In 2001, Paul Morrissey listed the remaining 5.7 acres (2.3 ha) of the property for $50 million, but it remained unsold for years. The price was later lowered to $45 million and by 2006 it was down to $40 million.

In 2007, Mickey Drexler, the CEO of J. Crew, purchased the property for $27 million. Drexler merged it with a neighboring 24-acre (9.7 ha) horse farm. In 2015, he listed the entire compound for $85 million.

In 2015, gallerist Adam Lindemann purchased the 5.7-acre (2.3 ha) property without the horse farm for a reported $50 million.
