= Skishing =

Fishing technique

Skishing is a variant on saltwater shorefishing that involves wearing a buoyant wetsuit and swimming out from shore with flippers to fish with rod and reel (typically a surfcasting rod), often using live eels. It is practiced as a means of getting further out to sea in order to increase the chances of catching a fish and can be dangerous. The term skishing is a portmanteau of water skiing and fishing, named as, when hooked, the stripers pull the angler through the water. Skishing has been described as extreme surfcasting.

The activity was invented by Paul Melnyk, a cabinet maker from Montauk, New York. Melnyk has explained that the activity is similar to skiing because "if you hook a fish over thirty pounds, it will generally take you for a ride".
