= Napeague, New York =

- Hamlet and census-designated place
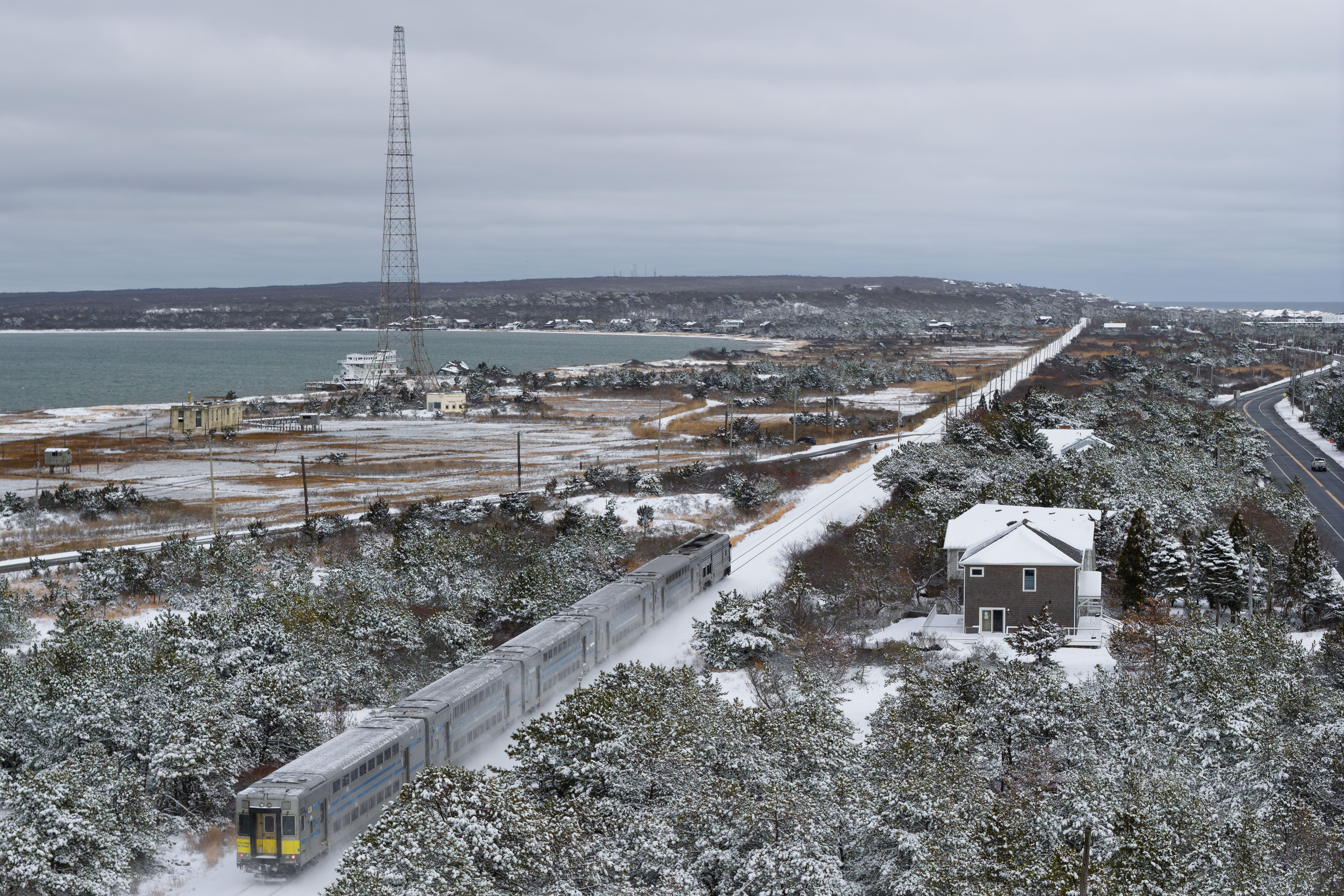
- Aerial view of an eastbound LIRR passenger train passing Mackay Tower

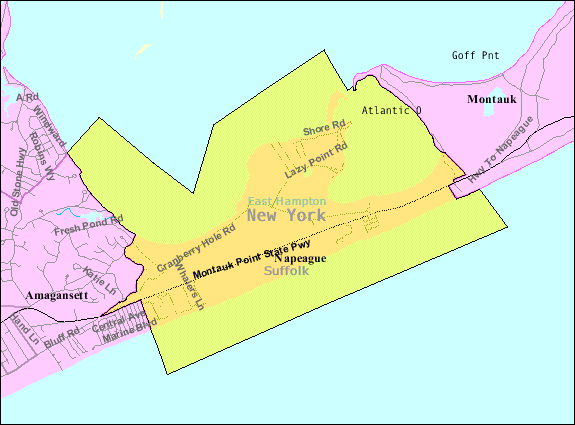

- Location within Long Island Location within New York Location within the United States
- Coordinates: 40°59′42″N 72°4′30″W
- Country: United States
- State: New York
- County: Suffolk
- Town: East Hampton

Area
  - Total: 8.54 sq mi (22.13 km^{2})
  - Land: 3.68 sq mi (9.53 km^{2})
  - Water: 4.86 sq mi (12.60 km^{2})
- Elevation: 6.6 ft (2 m)

Population (2020)
  - Total: 368
  - Density: 100.0/sq mi (38.61/km^{2})
- Time zone: UTC-5 (Eastern (EST))
  - Summer (DST): UTC-4 (EDT)
- FIPS code: 36-49424
- GNIS feature ID: 0958252

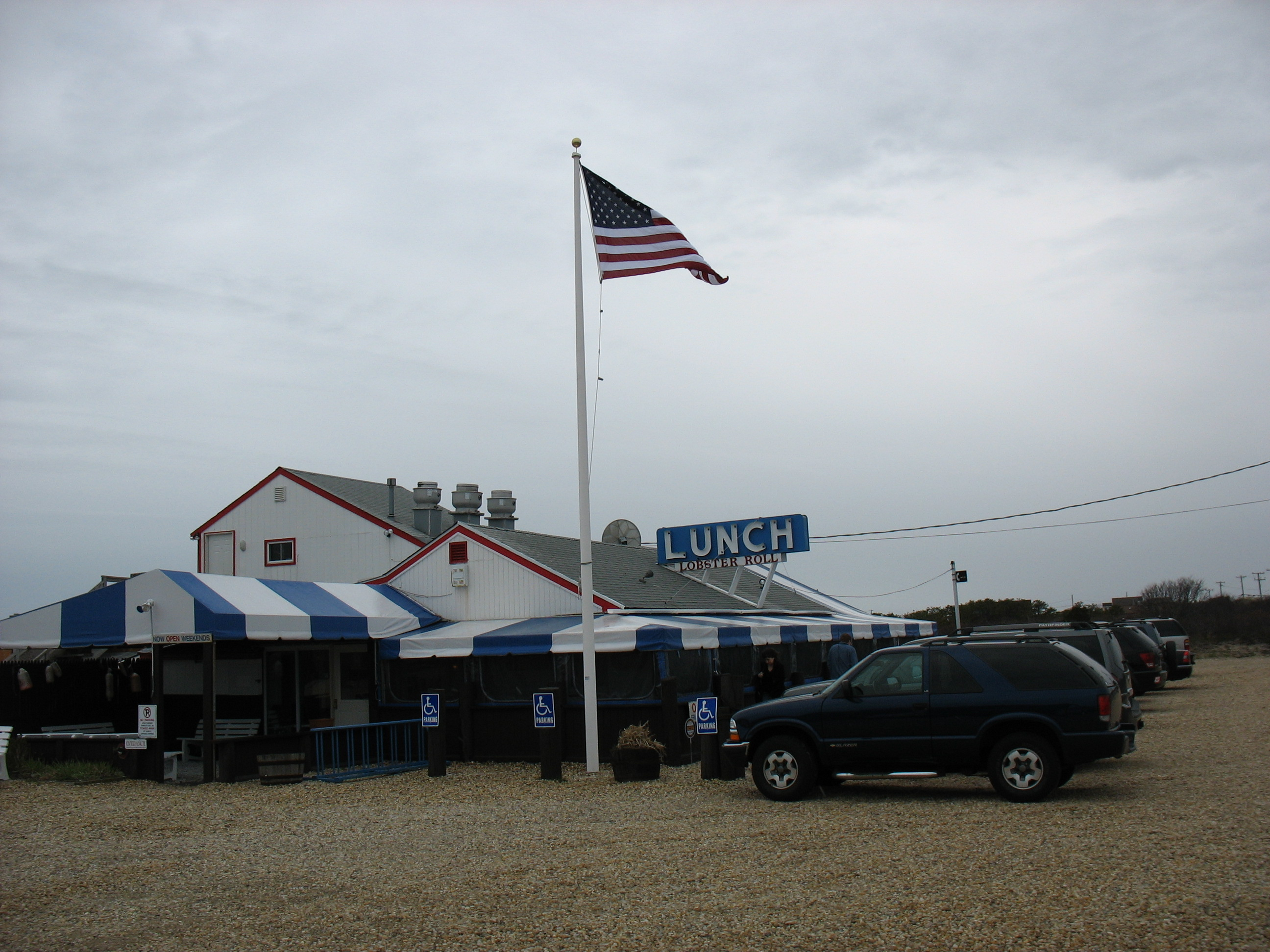
Lunch at the Lobster Roll restaurant in Napeague

Napeague (/ˈnæpiːɡ/, NAP-eeg) is a census-designated place (CDP) that roughly corresponds to the hamlet with the same name in the Town of East Hampton in Suffolk County, New York, United States. As of the 2020 census, Napeague had a population of 368.

Napeague is located on a very narrow, low-lying strip between the Atlantic Ocean to the south and Gardiners Bay to the north that was flooded in the Great Hurricane of 1938. It lies between Napeague State Park on the west and Hither Hills State Park on the east.

Napeague derives its name from the Montaukett name for "land overflowed by the sea".

== Landmark structures ==
The hamlet's three major landmarks are the Mackay Radio Tower, the Art Barge, and the Smith Meal Fish Factory.

=== Mackay Radio Tower ===
The Mackay Radio Tower is the last of two towers (originally 300 feet (91 m) high and 1,000 feet (300 m) apart) that were used to transmit international point-to-point radio communications starting in 1927. At the height of World War II the tower was used for responding to upwards of ten SOS calls a day from ships at sea. The tower had somebody on site 24 hours a day, but the actual transmissions were keyed from Southampton. The towers toppled during the Great 1938 Hurricane.

At 12:35 pm. on January 28, 1961, an American Airlines Boeing 707 Flight 1502 (Flagship Oklahoma) with an engine on fire nosedived over the towers before crashing about 300 yards (270 m) off the Napeague coast, killing all six aboard. The plane had been on a training flight from Idlewild Airport. An often repeated story says the plane clipped one of the towers, but The New York Times account of the crash says it just missed the towers.

The Mackay towers were decommissioned in 1984, and its underlying land is now part of Napeague State Park. One of the towers was torn down. The remaining tower is used for communication purposes by the New York State Police. Its flashing white lights were once visible throughout the area but haven't been operational in a year or two.

=== The Art Barge ===
The Art Barge is the home of the Victor D'Amico Institute of Art. Victor D'Amico was Director of Education for the Museum of Modern Art from 1937 until 1969. In 1955 the department had begun art classes at Ashawagh Hall in Springs, New York. D'Amico, looking for a permanent home, worked with local baymen to beach a retired World War II barge at its current location just northeast of the Mackay Towers. A summer outpost of MoMA's Institute of Modern Art, it was for a time called the Kearsarge Art Center, for a Native American word meaning "place of heaven". A second story was added in 1961. It was re-chartered as the Napeague Institute of Art in 1973 and finally renamed the Victor D'Amico Institute of Art, after its founder, in 1981. However, the popular name of "Art Barge" stuck. The Art Barge operates June through September. A complement to The Art Barge is the Mabel and Victor D'Amico Studio and Archive, the former home of Victor and his wife, the artist teacher Mabel Birckhead D'Amico, found across Napeague Harbor on the Lazy Point peninsula.

=== Smith Meal Fish Factory ===
The Smith Meal Fish Factory in Promised Land was a plant that processed menhaden fish for fish meal. It was owned by Otis Smith and produced 20–30 million fish a year from June to October and had its own flag stop on the Long Island Rail Road for employees only. After a drop in the supply of menhaden, Smith closed the plant in 1969 along with plants at Lewes, Delaware, and Crab Island, New Jersey. The plants were consolidated at Port Monmouth, New Jersey. Next to the Smith meal plant is a private marine finfish hatchery, Multi Aquaculture Systems, founded in 1976 by Dr. Robert J. Valenti, and a small restaurant.

The closed Smith Meal Fish Factory was sold to The Nature Conservancy, who transferred it to the State Parks Commission. Napeague State Park was the subject of an ongoing court battle about whether it should be used as a dock for the Cross Sound Ferry for a car ferry service to New London, Connecticut. The park has been undeveloped since its transfer in 1986 and is home to a nesting colony of piping plover which will dictate its future use.

== Water sports ==
Napeague Harbor is a kiteboarding and windsurfing destination on Long Island. With flat waters and steady wind, Napeague is used by beginners and advanced riders.

== Geography ==
According to the United States Census Bureau, the CDP has a total area of 3.7 square miles (9.7 km^{2}), of which 3.7 square miles (9.5 km^{2}) is land and 0.08 square miles (0.2 km^{2}), or 2.12%, is water.

At the end of the last ice age, Napeague was submerged under the sea. (At that time, Montauk was an island.) In the intervening several thousand years, ocean currents, or littoral drift, filled in this space with sand, giving rise to Napeague.

The main settlement in Napeague is the small community of Lazy Point, also known as "Promised Land". It acquired this nickname, according to local lore, because of the menhaden plant located there in years gone by, which "stunk to high heaven".

Historical population
Census	Pop.	Note	%±
2000	223		—
2010	200		−10.3%
2020	368		84.0%
U.S. Decennial Census

== Demographics ==
=== Racial and ethnic composition ===
Napeague CDP, New York – Racial and ethnic composition Note: the US Census treats Hispanic/Latino as an ethnic category. This table excludes Latinos from the racial categories and assigns them to a separate category. Hispanics/Latinos may be of any race.
Race / Ethnicity (NH = Non-Hispanic)	Pop 2000	Pop 2010	Pop 2020	% 2000	% 2010	% 2020
White alone (NH)	202	187	307	90.58%	93.50%	83.42%
Black or African American alone (NH)	2	1	7	0.90%	0.50%	1.90%
Native American or Alaska Native alone (NH)	3	1	0	1.35%	0.50%	0.00%
Asian alone (NH)	0	3	11	0.00%	1.50%	2.99%
Native Hawaiian or Pacific Islander alone (NH)	0	0	0	0.00%	0.00%	0.00%
Other race alone (NH)	0	0	4	0.00%	0.00%	1.09%
Mixed race or Multiracial (NH)	1	2	10	0.45%	1.00%	2.72%
Hispanic or Latino (any race)	15	6	29	6.73%	3.00%	7.88%
Total	223	200	368	100.00%	100.00%	100.00%

=== 2010 census ===
As of the census of 2010, there were 200 people, 107 households, and 60 families residing in the CDP. The population density was 53.4 inhabitants per square mile (20.6/km^{2}). There were 762 housing units at an average density of 203.5 per square mile (78.6/km^{2}). The racial makeup of the CDP was 95.5% White, 1.5% Asian, 1.0% African American, 0.5% Native American, and 1.5% from two or more races. Hispanic or Latino of any race were 3.0% of the population.

There were 107 households, out of which 17.8% had children under the age of 18 living with them, 41.1% were married couples living together, 8.4% had a female householder with no husband present, 6.5% had a male householder with no wife present, and 43.9% were non-families. 40.2% of all households were made up of individuals, and 18.6% had someone living alone who was 65 years of age or older. The average household size was 1.87 and the average family size was 2.45.

In the CDP, the population was spread out, with 15.0% under the age of 20, 1.0% from 20 to 24, 21.0% from 25 to 44, 37.0% from 45 to 64, and 26.0% who were 65 years of age or older. The median age was 55.4 years. For every 100 females, there were 92.3 males. For every 100 females age 20 and over, there were 91.0 males.

The median income for a household in the CDP was $93,750, and the median income for a family was $120,313. Males had a median income of $96,250 versus $32,024 for females. The per capita income for the CDP was $63,869. No families and 2.4% of the population were below the poverty line, including none of those under the age of eighteen and 11.8% of those 65 or over.

== Education ==
Napeauge is served by the Amagansett Union Free School District.

Preceded by Hither Hills	The Hamptons	Succeeded by Amagansett
