= Gardiners Bay =

Body of water in Long Island, New York

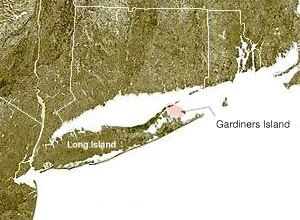

- Location within New York
- Location: Suffolk County, New York
- Coordinates: 41°05′52″N 72°12′45″W
- Ocean/sea sources: Atlantic Ocean
- Basin countries: United States

Gardiners Bay is a small arm of the Atlantic Ocean, approximately 10 mi (16 km) long and 8 mi (13 km) wide in the U.S. state of New York between the two flukelike peninsulas at the eastern end of Long Island. It is bounded on its eastern end, where it connects to Block Island Sound, by Gardiners Island and Napeague.

Adjoining harbors include Three Mile Harbor, Clearwater beach, Acabonack Harbor, and Lazy Point's Napeague harbor. Native fish include; Striped Bass, Bluefish, Fluke, Yellowtail, flounder, blackfish, weakfish, Porgy, sea Robbin, and sea skate. The area is fed by the nearby estuaries of Three mile Harbor, Acabonack Creek, and Napeague, which produce ideal environments for shellfish and crustaceans. Blue claw crab, oysters, and hard shell clams, scallops, and conch are abundant throughout these areas.

It is bounded on the western end by Shelter Island. It connects by two channels at the north and south end of Shelter Island to Great Peconic Bay. During the American Revolutionary War and the War of 1812, the bay was controlled by the British, who used Gardiners Island to store provisions. The British fleet assembled in Cherry Harbor in the bay before sailing to the Chesapeake Bay to attack Washington, D.C. and burn the United States Capitol.

Gardiners Bay is part of the Peconic Estuary and received the designation as an Estuary of National Significance from the U.S. Environmental Protection Agency in 1993.

== Pop culture references ==
Gardiners Bay is mentioned in the song 'The Downeaster "Alexa"' by Billy Joel.
