= Hither Hills State Park =

State park in Suffolk County, New York, United States

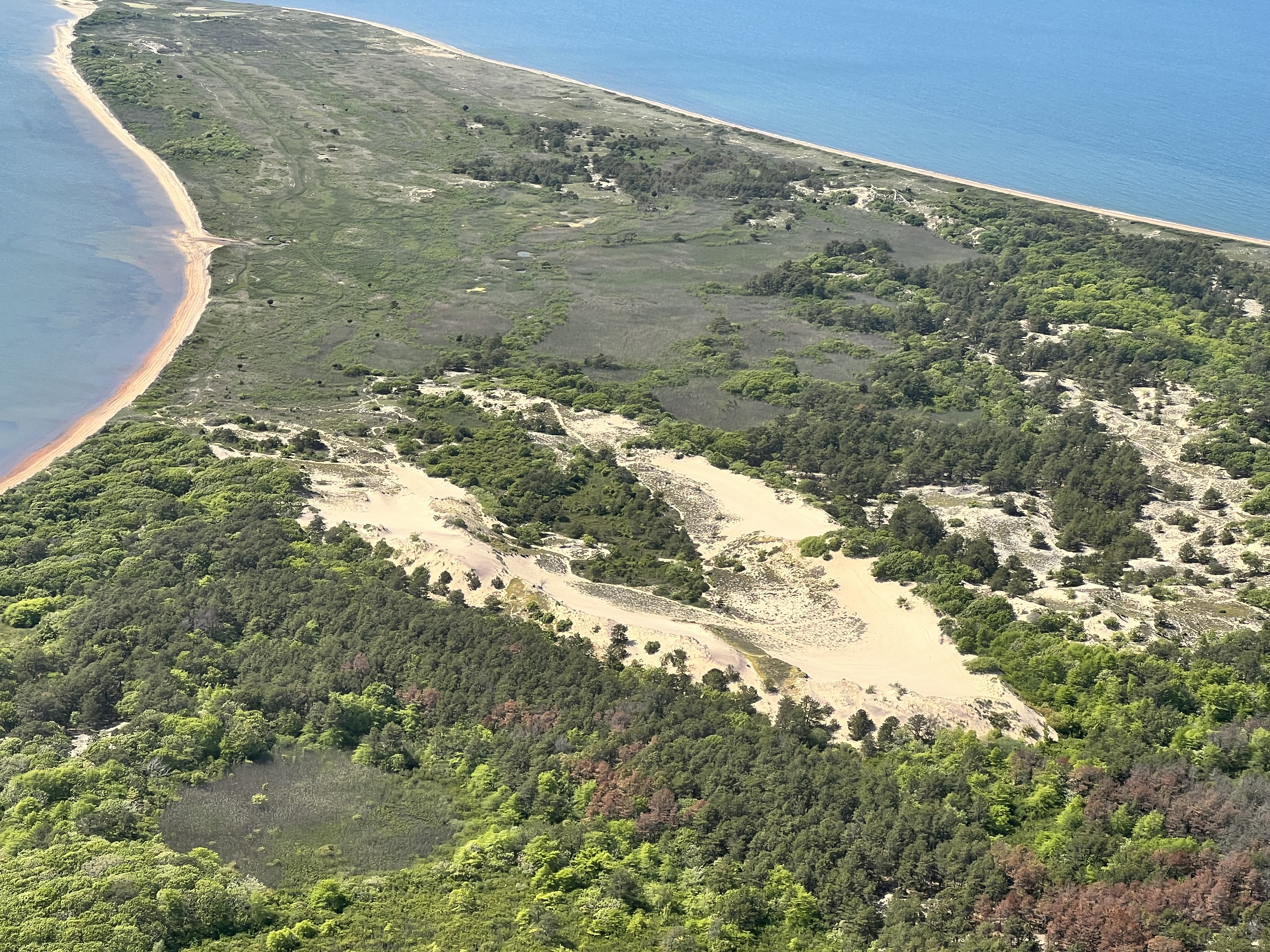
- Walking Dunes at Hither Hills State Park, 2023

- Location within New York
- Type: State park
- Location: 164 Old Montauk Highway; Montauk, New York
- Coordinates: 41°01′N 72°01′W
- Area: 7.1 square kilometres (2.7 sq mi)
- Created: August 1924
- Operator: New York State Office of Parks, Recreation and Historic Preservation
- Visitors: 665,218 (in 2024)
- Open: All year
- Camp sites: 168
- Website: Hither Hills State Park

Hither Hills State Park is a 7.1-square-kilometre (2.7 sq mi) state park located on the eastern end of the South Fork of Long Island near the hamlet of Montauk, New York.

== History ==
The land that was to become Hither Hills State Park was once slated for private development of a recreational complex, including hotels, casinos, a polo field, and yacht basin, in the early 20th century. After the planned development was blocked by the Long Island State Park Commission, a portion of the private holdings were sold to New York State, who opened the 7.1-square-kilometre (2.7 sq mi) parcel as Hither Hills State Park in August 1924.

== Description ==
=== Location and access ===
The park is located on the South Fork of Long Island at Napeague. Three additional state parks a few miles farther east are: Montauk Downs State Park, Camp Hero State Park, and Montauk Point State Park.

The nearby hamlet of Montauk is accessible from the park via the Montauk Highway and the Montauk Branch of the Long Island Rail Road. Suffolk Transit's 10C route also serves the beach connecting it with East Hampton and Montauk, and the Amagansett, East Hampton and Montauk Long Island Rail Road stations on the Montauk Branch.

=== Features and amenities ===
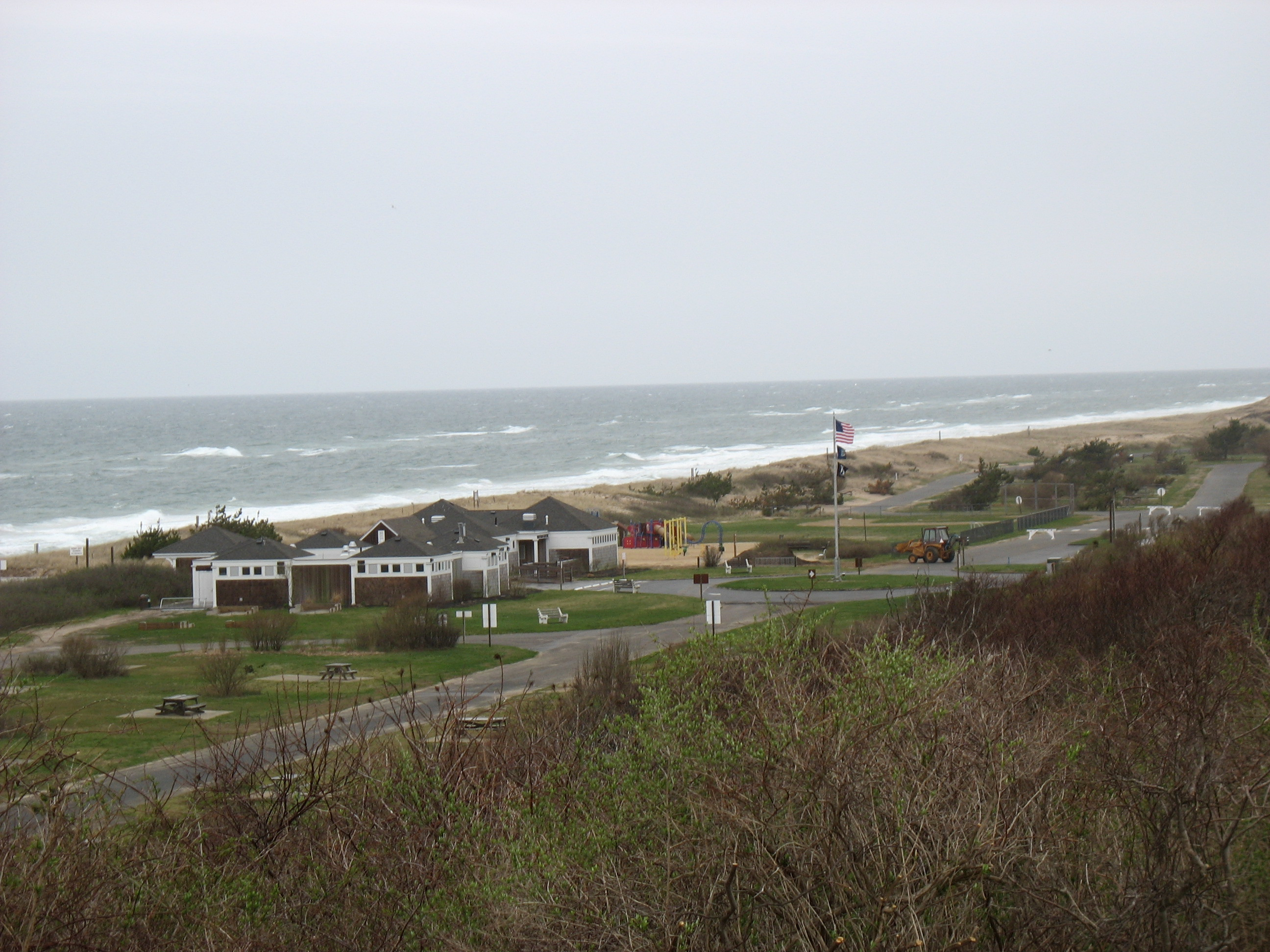
The main buildings along the campgrounds near Old Montauk Highway.

The park offers a sandy, ocean beach; picnic tables; a playground; recreation programs; a nature trail; hiking; a bridle path; hunting, fishing; a campground with 168 tent and trailer sites near the ocean; cross-country skiing; and a food concession. The park includes Walking Dunes Trail, featuring a view of the parabolic, migrating sand dunes, which are rare in the Eastern United States; most beach dunes are linear and do not migrate.

== See also ==
- List of New York state parks
- Montauk Point land claim

Preceded by Montauk	The Hamptons	Succeeded by Napeague
