= Amsterdam Beach State Park =

State park in Suffolk County, New York

- Location within New York
- Type: State park (undeveloped)
- Location: Suffolk County, New York
- Nearest city: Montauk, New York
- Coordinates: 41°02′39″N 71°53′48″W
- Area: 199 acres (81 ha)
- Created: 2005
- Operator: New York State Office of Parks, Recreation and Historic Preservation; Town of East Hampton; Suffolk County
- Visitors: 28,272 (in 2023)
- Open: All year

Amsterdam Beach State Park is a 199-acre (81 ha) undeveloped state park on the Atlantic Ocean in the Town of East Hampton just east of Montauk, New York. The land is also known as the Amsterdam Beach Preserve.

== History ==
The area is referred to locally as the Montauk Moorlands, and was privately owned prior to the state's initial purchase of 122 acres (49 ha) in 2005. The land was acquired for a total of $16.5 million, of which the Town of East Hampton paid $6 million, Suffolk County paid $5.5 million, New York State paid $4 million, and $1 million was paid from a federal grant.

At the time of its purchase, the property represented one of the largest unprotected continuous tracts of undeveloped land in Montauk. An additional 77 acres (31 ha) of adjacent property was acquired in 2008, increasing the park's size to nearly 200 acres (80.9 ha).

The property is owned jointly by New York State, the Town of East Hampton and Suffolk County.

== Park description ==
The park, located between Shadmoor State Park and the Nature Conservancy's Andy Warhol Preserve, is largely undeveloped and is maintained with the intention of preserving its value as natural habitat. It includes 1,288 feet (393 m) of ocean frontage, several ponds and 54 acres (22 ha) of tidal and freshwater wetlands.

Woody vegetation at Amsterdam Beach consists mainly of shadbush (Amelanchier), highbush blueberry (Vaccinium corymbosum), black cherry (Prunus serotina), arrowwood (Viburnum dentatum), and several species of holly (Ilex). The land hosts several regionally threatened species, including northern harriers, spotted turtles and Cooper's hawks, and is additionally utilized by shorebirds and migratory bird species following the Atlantic Flyway. A number of amphibians, including the protected blue-spotted salamander, have been observed at Amsterdam Beach.

A network of trails was completed on the property in 2011.

== See also ==
- List of New York state parks
