= Lake Montauk =

Artificial embayment in New York, United States

Coordinates: 41.068675°N 71.92800°W

Lake Montauk is a 900-acre (360 ha) artificial embayment in Montauk, New York that is home to the largest commercial and sporting fish fleets in the state of New York.

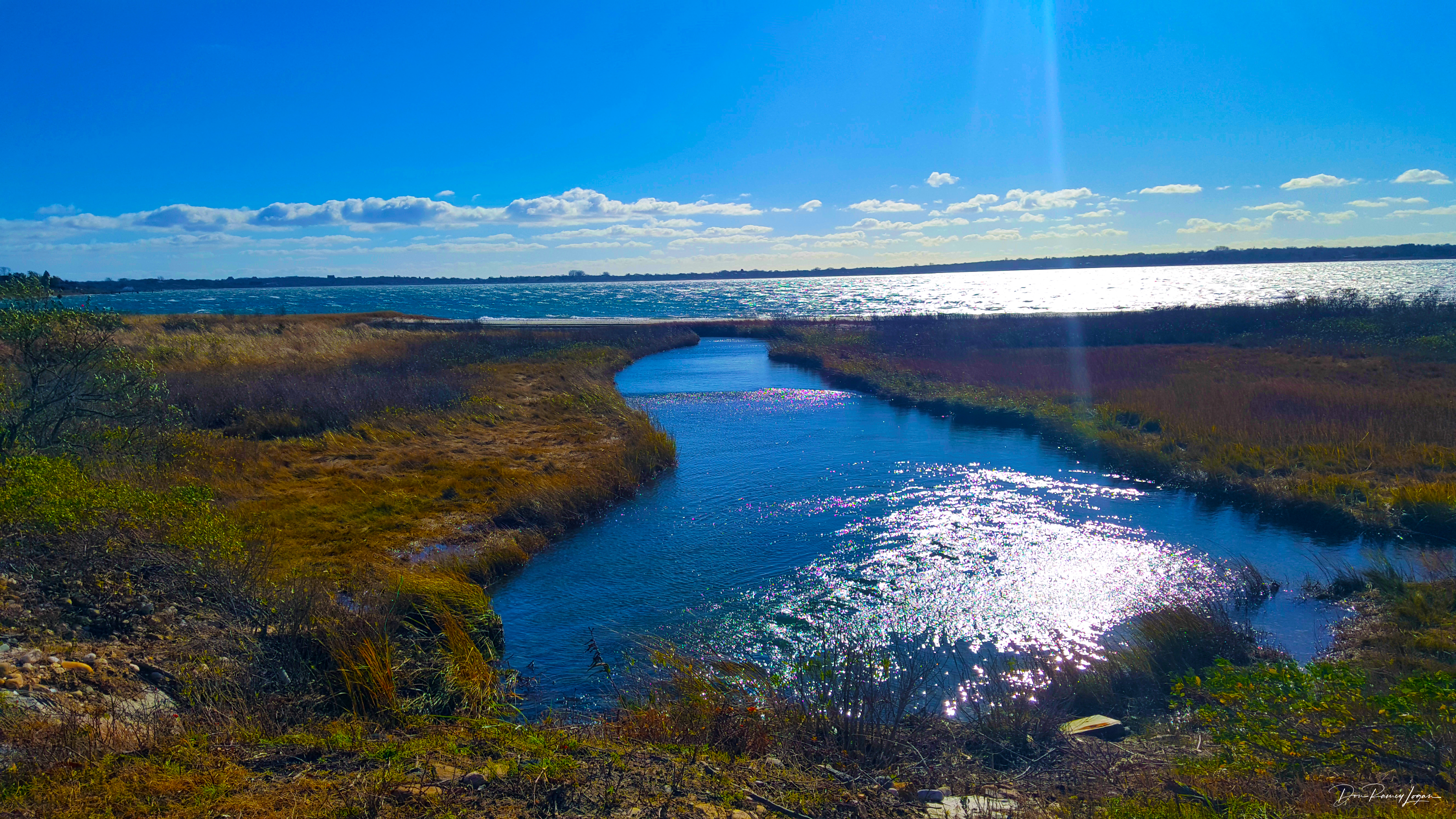
Lake Montauk

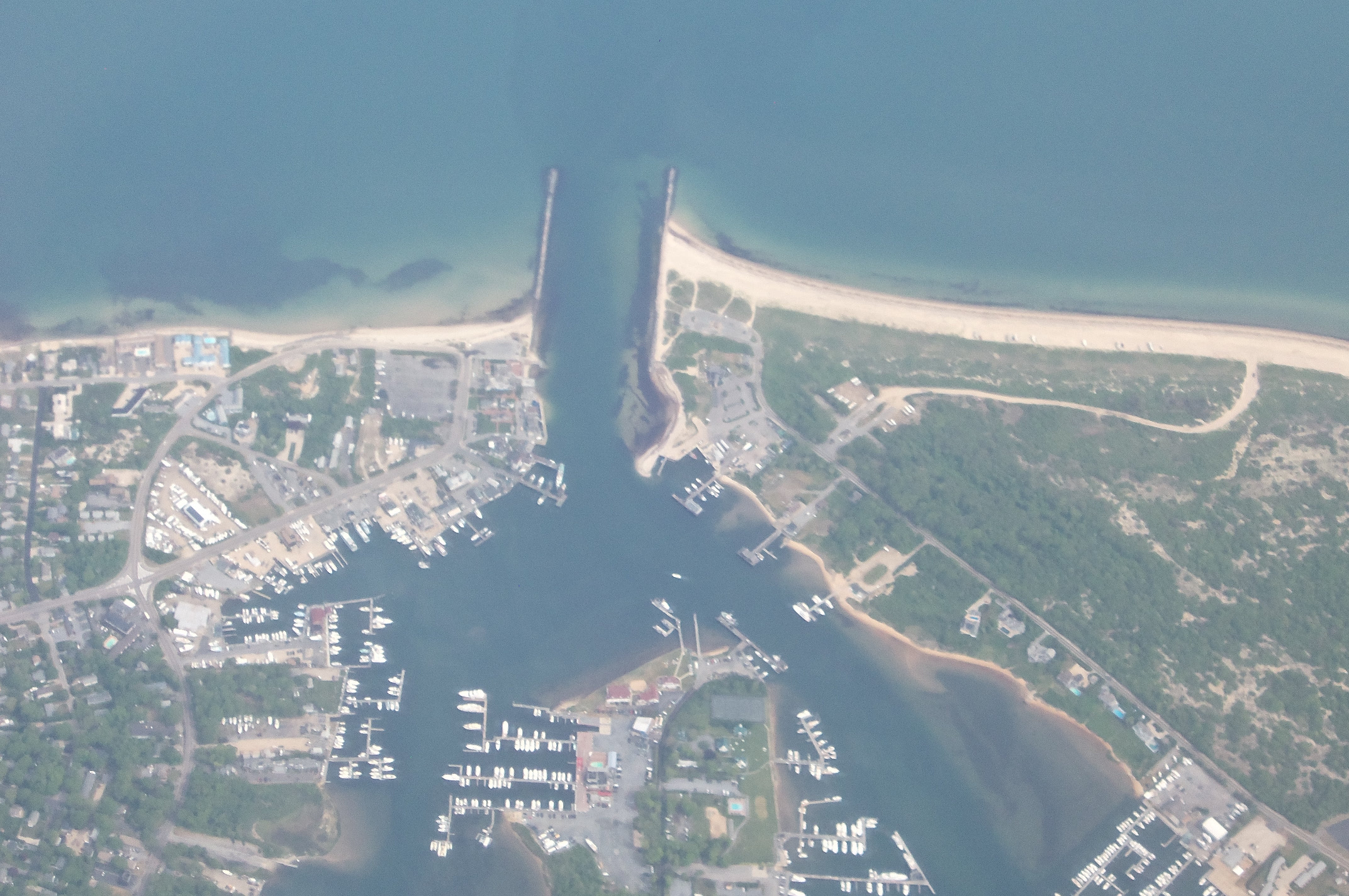
Lake Montauk inlet, NY

== History ==
The lake was originally referred to on maps as Lake Wyandanch and commonly referred to as the "Great Lake". It was the largest body of freshwater on Long Island, more than double the size of Lake Ronkonkoma. In 1927, real estate developer Carl Fisher blasted a gap on the northern shoreline to connect the lake to Block Island Sound and the Atlantic Ocean.

Fisher intended to develop the new port of Montauk into the "Miami Beach of the North". On Star Island, a small island in the lake, he built the Montauk Yacht Club and Star Island Casino. His other projects included the hotel Montauk Manor, Montauk Playhouse, the golf course Montauk Downs, and the six-story Montauk Tower. Fisher renamed the lake Lake Montauk.

After Fisher opened and dredged the lake, the lake replaced Fort Pond Bay as Montauk's main port (Fort Pond Bay is notoriously shallow and rocky with one of its more famous groundings being HMS Culloden during the American Revolution).

Fisher's enterprises became bankrupt after the Crash of 1929. The United States Navy assumed control of the lake during World War II along with other Fisher businesses including Montauk Manor.

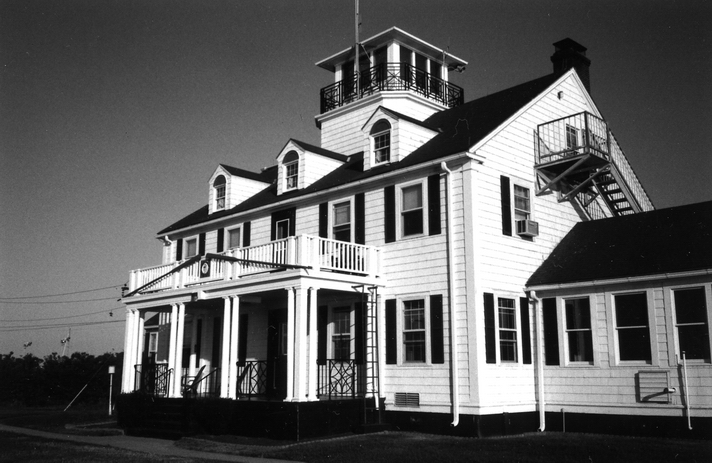
The Montauk Coast Guard Station on Star Island.

== Development ==
After World War II, the lake became a well-known commercial and sports fishing area, and became New York's largest fishing port.

In the 1970s, a proposal was made to dam the sound and build a canal through the former Montaukett Indian Field and Big Reed Pond for a new outlet. The plan included a proposal for constructing more than 1,000 houses along the new waterway. Intense local opposition organized by Hilda Lindley stopped the plan. Suffolk County assumed ownership of the property and it is now Theodore Roosevelt County Park (formerly Montauk County Park).

Among the businesses on the lake is the only ferry service in East Hampton town. It offers service during summers to Block Island, Martha's Vineyard, and New London, Connecticut.

The United States Coast Guard also operates a station on Star Island. Montauk Airport is on the east side of the lake, on East Lake Drive.

== Fishing ==
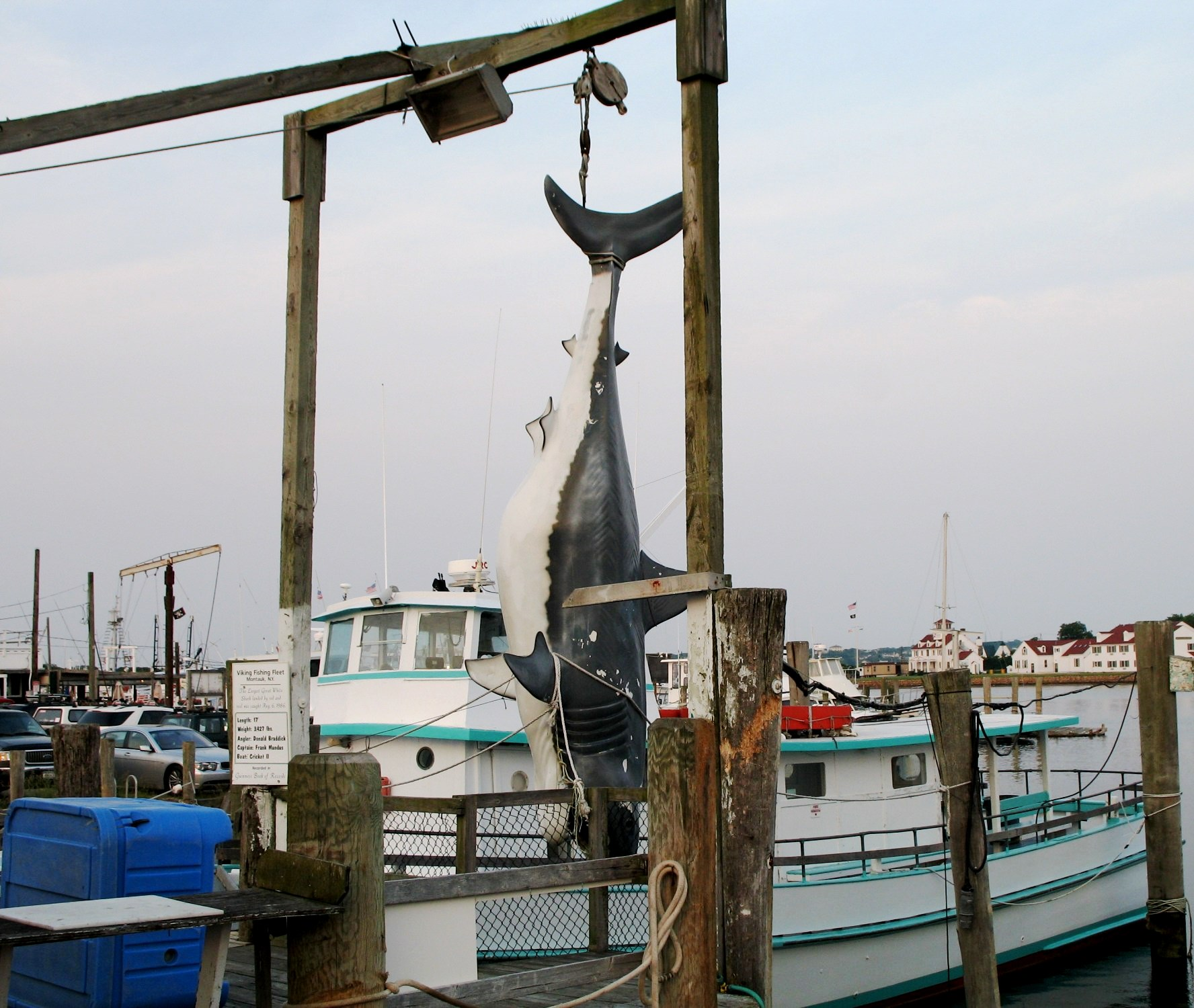
Fiberglass copy of 3,427-pound (1,554 kg) great white shark caught off Montauk in 1986 and brought into the harbor by Frank Mundus

Montauk is noted as one of the leading centers for sport fishing on the Atlantic Coast. By 1986, it claimed 39 world-record catches. including a 76-pound (34 kg) striped bass.

Montauk hosts several annual shark tournaments. The craze for shark fishing off Montauk was encouraged in the 1970s by local boat operator Frank Mundus who often was reported in stories as the source for the character Quint in the movie Jaws. Mundus caught a 4,500-pound (2,041 kg) great white shark by harpoon and a 3,427-pound (1,554 kg) great white shark by rod and reel.
