= Cocolobo Cay Club =

Former private club in Biscayne National Park

Coordinates: 25°23′51″N 80°14′04″W

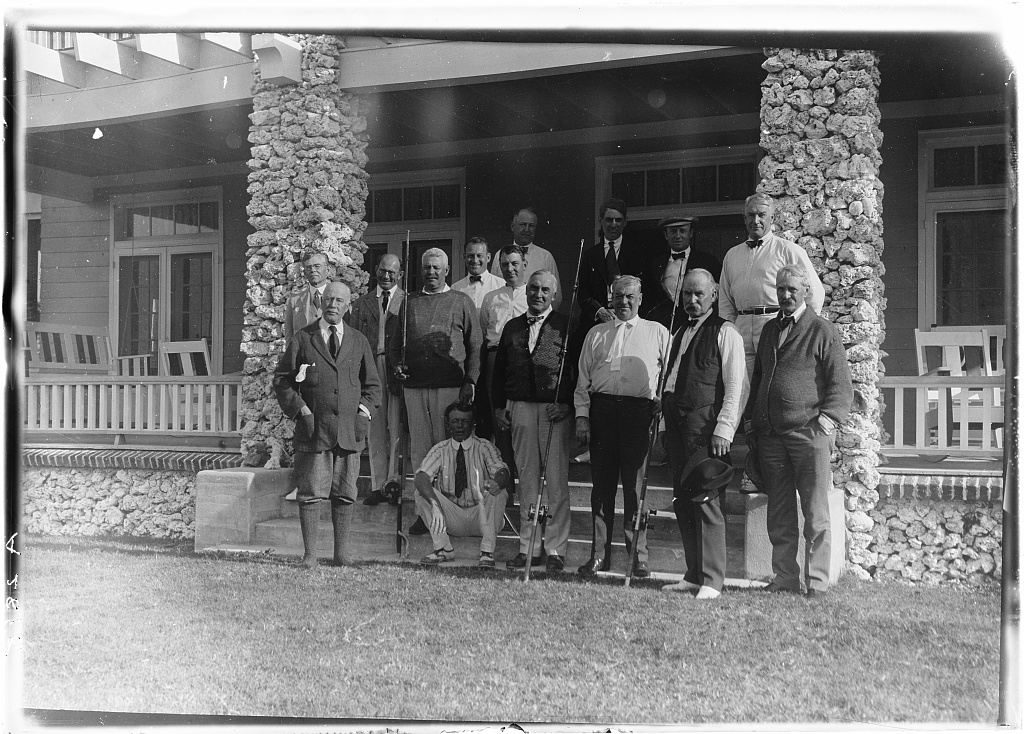
President Warren G. Harding and fishing party at the Cocolobo Cay Club

The Cocolobo Cay Club, later known as the Coco Lobo Club, was a private club on Adams Key in what is now Biscayne National Park, Florida. It was notable as a destination for the rich and the politically well-connected. Four presidents (Warren G. Harding, Herbert Hoover, Lyndon Johnson and Richard Nixon) visited while president, and numerous U.S. senators including John F. Kennedy visited the club. It was established by millionaire Carl G. Fisher as a getaway in 1922, passing to motor boat racer Gar Wood, then to Nixon friend Bebe Rebozo in 1954. The main club building burned down in 1974 after the property was incorporated into Biscayne National Monument, and the remaining structures were destroyed by Hurricane Andrew in 1992.

== Establishment ==
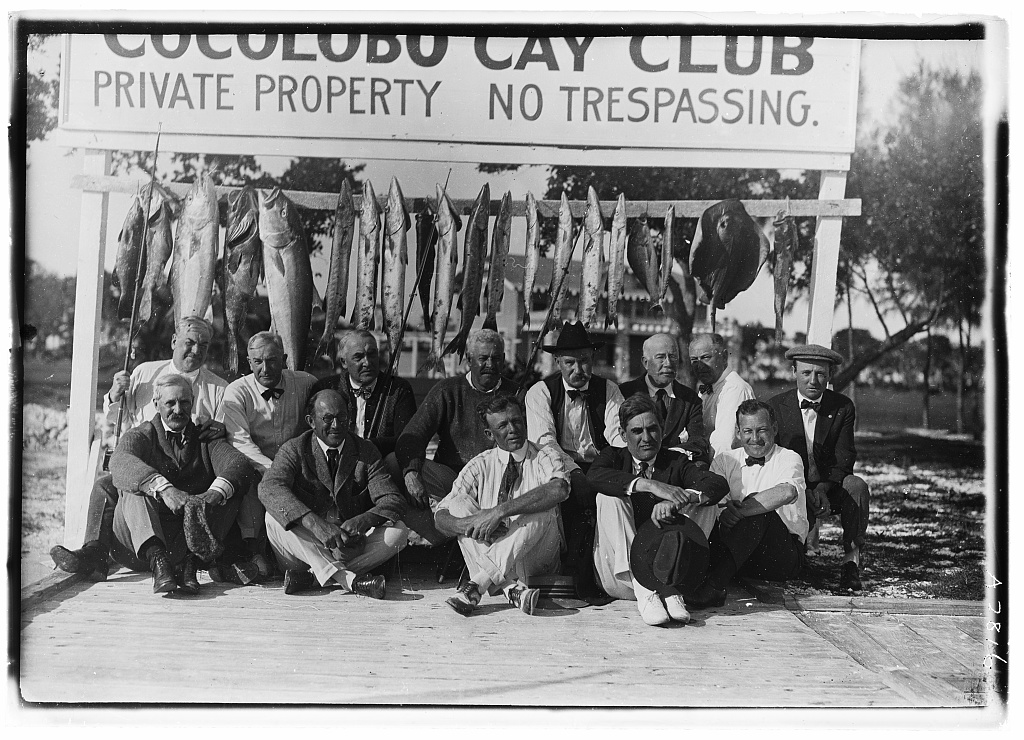
Harding and fishing party at the Cocolobo dock

American entrepreneur Carl G. Fisher, who was responsible for much of the development of Miami Beach, bought Adams Key, once known as Cocolobo Key, in 1916. With partners Charles W. Kotcher and Jim Snowden, Fisher built the Cocolobo Cay Club by 1918, named for the native pigeon plum (Coccoloba diversifolia) The two-story club building had ten guest rooms, a dining room, and a separate recreation lodge. Members included Warren G. Harding, Albert Fall, T. Coleman DuPont, Harvey Firestone, Jack Dempsey, Charles F. Kettering, Will Rogers and Frank Seiberling.

Harding was a frequent visitor. A March 1923 trip was made with companions Albert Lasker, chairman of the Lod & Thomas advertising agency, who would resign the chairmanship of the United States Shipping Board on July 1 under investigation, Harding's personal secretary George B. Christian, Fisher, John Oliver La Gorce of the National Geographic Society, James A. Allison, who brought the party to the club from Miami on his yacht Seashore, and others. The club was the destination of the annual Miami Committee of One Hundred outing each January during the 1920s and 1930s.

== Decline and revival ==
The club had declined with the Wall Street crash of 1929 which saw Fisher lose his fortune, but was revived by Garfield Wood in 1934. Wood owned the club outright after a foreclosure sale in 1937. Among their clients were avid fisherman Herbert Hoover and his family. Wood sold the Cocolobo Cay Club to a group of investors led by Florida banker Bebe Rebozo in 1954, who renamed it the Coco Lobo Fishing Club. Clients guided by the Joneses included then-senators John F. Kennedy, Lyndon Johnson, Richard Nixon, Herman Talmadge and George Smathers through the 1940s and 1950s. In 1965 the clubhouse was damaged by Hurricane Betsy, going unrepaired.

During congressional debate on the establishment of Biscayne National Monument in 1968, Rebozo unsuccessfully approached the bill's sponsor, Congressman Dante Fascell to get Fascell to withdraw the bill, which would require Rebozo to sell the property to the government. In 1973 Rebozo still owned the 77 acres (31 ha) on Adams Key, finally selling it to the Park Service for $550,000.

== Biscayne National Park ==
The two-story Lodge featured a wide front porch looking onto a lawn. Following its acquisition by the National Park Service, the club burned down on December 21, 1974. The two-room "casino", a separate building for games and cards, was repaired by the Park Service and used as a meeting place for students visiting the key. The caretaker's residence was rehabilitated for the use of the key's resident ranger. All of the Cocolobo structures were destroyed by Hurricane Andrew in 1992. Adams Key is now a day-use area, with two Park Service families residing on the island where the club used to be.

== See also ==
- Caribbean Club, a club developed by Fisher on Key Largo in 1938, shortly before his death in 1939

== Bibliography ==
- Miller, Lloyd (2008), Biscayne National Park: It Almost Wasn't, LEMDOT Publishing. ISBN 978-0-615-17494-5.
- Leynes, Jennifer Brown; Cullison, David (1998), Biscayne National Park Historic Resource Study, National Park Service
- Shumaker, Susan (2012), Untold Stories from America's National Parks: Israel Lafayette "Parson" Jones, Sir Lancelot Jones and Biscayne National Park. Public Broadcasting Service.
