= Montauk Downs State Park =

State park in New York, United States

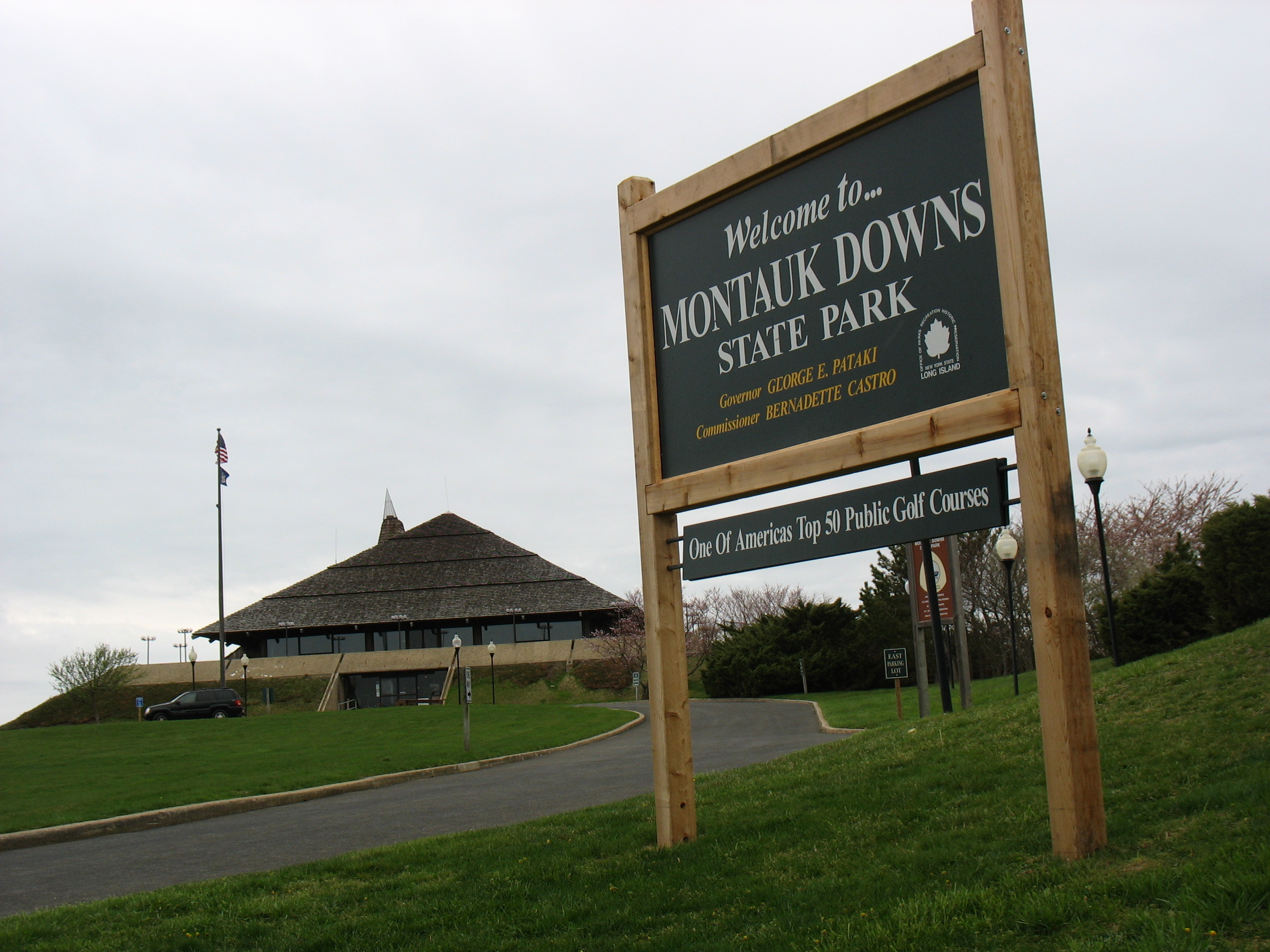

- Location within the United States Location within New York
- 41°03′01″N 71°56′31″W

Club information
- Location: Montauk, New York
- Established: 1968
- Type: Public
- Owner: New York State
- Total holes: 18
- Website: parks.ny.gov
- Designed by: Robert Trent Jones
- Par: 72
- Length: 6.4 kilometres (4.0 mi)
- Course rating: 74.7
- Slope rating: 141

Montauk Downs State Park is a state park in Montauk, New York, United States. The park is located in Suffolk County near the eastern tip of Long Island's South Fork, about one mile (1.6 km) east of the hamlet of Montauk. Montauk Downs State Park includes an 18-hole championship golf course, driving range, tennis courts, swimming pool, and restaurant facilities.

== History ==
The golf course traces its history back to a private course originally developed by Carl G. Fisher in 1927, with Captain H.C. Tippet as its architect. Two years earlier, Fisher had purchased 40 square kilometres (15 sq mi) in Montauk in hopes of turning it into the "Miami of the North." Other Fisher projects included the Montauk Manor, Montauk Yacht Club, and a six-story office building in downtown Montauk. Fisher lost his fortune in the 1929 Stock Market Crash.

The golf course, along with the Montauk Manor, was taken over by a group of private investors in 1966 and became known as the Montauk Golf and Racquet Club. Robert Trent Jones redesigned the golf course two years later and a new clubhouse was also constructed, replacing the original clubhouse designed by Stanford White, which had been destroyed by a fire. The private club eventually fell into bankruptcy and was purchased by New York State in 1978.

The large area of land within the golf course south of the fifth and sixth holes was originally planned to be developed with a series of condominium complexes similar in design to the Villas of Montauk Downs on Fairway Place, a 24-unit complex that opened in 1980. Another 24-unit condominium complex named Harbor Ridge opened at the end of Fairway Place in 1988, while the remainder of the land has remained undeveloped. A small population of sandplain gerardia is found near this area, a wildflower on the federal endangered species list, which prompted a land swap in the siting of the Harbor Ridge development.

Montauk Downs has been consistently rated as one of America's top public golf courses. In 2009, it was ranked second overall in the Golf World list of Reader's Choice Awards for overall value, behind the Bethpage Black Course, and ranked 38th overall in Golfweek's list of the Best Municipal Courses. Before the advent of the current telephone reservation system, some golfers would sleep in their cars overnight to get morning tee times at Montauk Downs, particularly on weekends during the summer. Although the idea of creating a second golf course in Montauk at Camp Hero State Park was once under consideration, it was dropped in 1999 due to environmental concerns.

Rees Jones, the son of Robert Trent Jones, began helping to redesign some of the holes at Montauk Downs in 2002. Renovations have included moving back tee boxes to lengthen holes and bring hazards back into play (accounting for recent advances in equipment that allow balls to be hit further distances), reconstructing the bunkers and installing a new irrigation system. These improvements are being made gradually to avoid interrupting play. Every year Montauk Downs holds a gala event at the end of the summer to help raise money for the golf course renovations.

== Course layout ==
With both the Atlantic Ocean and Block Island Sound located nearby, the golf course is one of the windiest locations in the country and weather conditions can make the course play differently each day. Most of the holes have small greens that require precision approach shots over bunkers and there are five water hazards on the course. The 12th hole at Montauk Downs is considered one of Long Island's toughest holes. The 228 yard par 3 has an elevated tee and green, requiring players to carry a deep valley of fescue grass. The green is guarded by three sand traps, including two deep bunkers in the front.

Montauk Downs State Park
Tee	Rating/Slope	1	2	3	4	5	6	7	8	9	Out	10	11	12	13	14	15	16	17	18	In	Total
Black	74.7/141	398	161	444	430	530	370	508	186	458	3485	499	326	228	496	219	465	377	420	461	3491	6976
Blue	73.5/139	386	148	421	410	520	353	500	167	445	3350	480	305	200	485	195	444	370	403	441	3323	6673
White	72.0/136	372	115	374	396	488	326	490	154	435	3150	464	289	170	474	185	407	362	372	417	3140	6290
Red	75.5/137	352	101	335	370	467	301	454	117	398	2895	453	274	120	441	159	376	334	351	384	2892	5787
Par	Par	4	3	4	4	5	4	5	3	4	36	5	4	3	5	3	4	4	4	4	36	72
SI	Handicap	11	17	9	5	3	13	7	15	1		2	18	14	8	16	6	10	12	4

== Staff ==
The general manager of Montauk Downs and the other state parks in Montauk is Tom Dess. Charlie Reidlinger serves as the superintendent of the golf course. Before coming to Montauk Downs, he was the superintendent of the Red Course at Bethpage State Park and the assistant superintendent of the Blak Course. The current head golf professional at Montauk Downs is Angela Tocco.

== Clubhouse ==
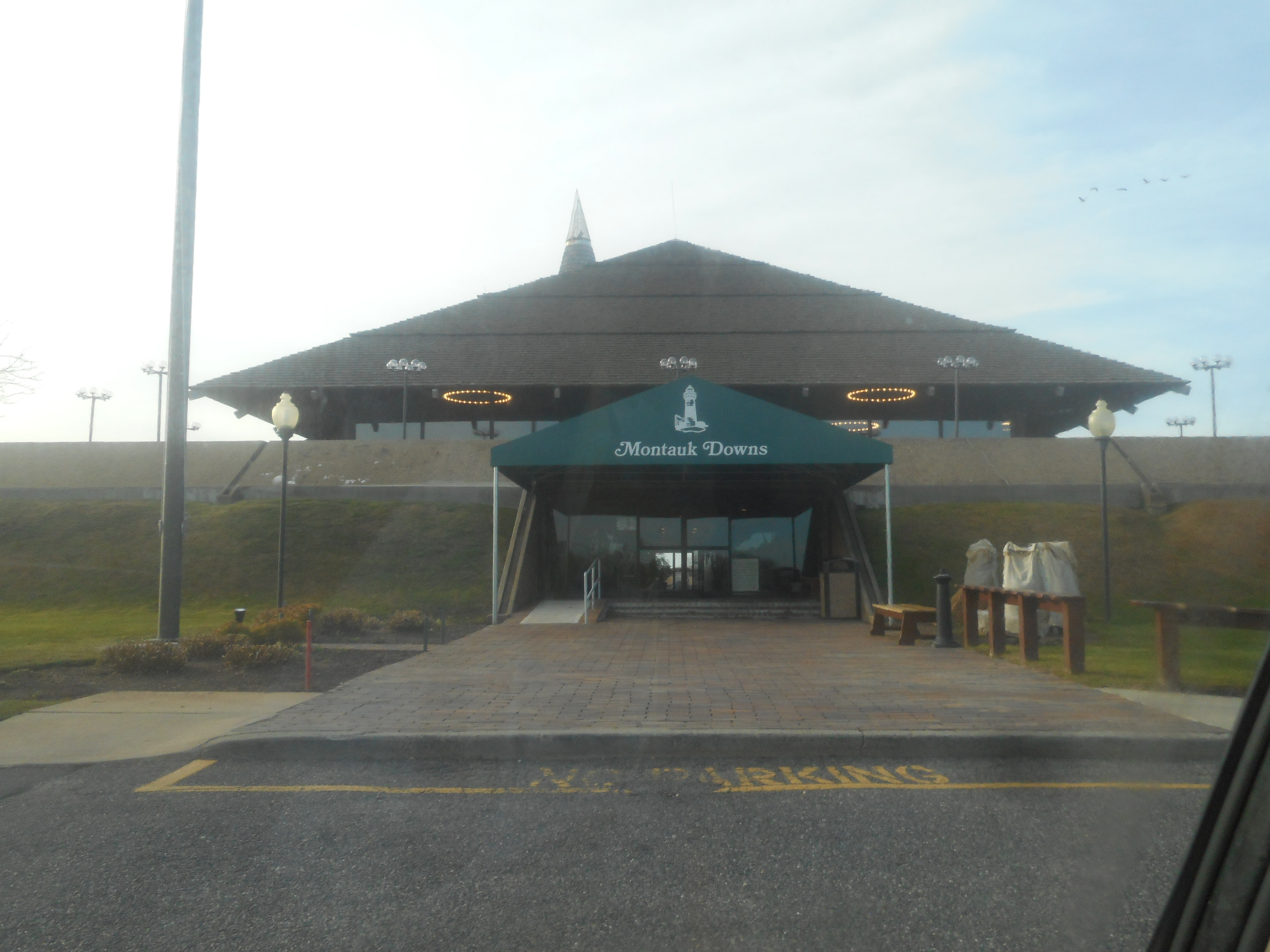
The clubhouse's exterior in 2019

The park's clubhouse is shaped in the form of a pyramid. Designed by architect Richard Foster, the structure was originally built as part of the development of the Montauk Golf and Racquet Club, which opened in 1969. It is located on the same site as the golf course's original clubhouse, which was designed by Stamford White, but is about three times larger in size.

The upper level of the building has a 360-degree view of the golf course and the surrounding area and was originally the location of the club's entertainment facilities including the main dining room and bar. The large room contains a high ceiling, is enclosed by glass walls, and is bordered by an outdoor terrace that is partly covered by the building's sloped roof. The main entrance to the club was located on the lower level of the building, which included another dining room and bar, a kitchen, men's and women's locker rooms, a sauna, and a pro shop. The lower level is surrounded by a sloped landscaped berm, making only the top level of the building and its wood-shingled roof visible from the exterior. A sub-basement is used for the storage of electric golf carts.

The clubhouse was the recipient of the grand award at the Long Island Association's annual awards dinner in November 1969.

== See also ==
- List of New York state parks
