= Allison Mansion =

Historic house in Indiana, United States

- U.S. National Register of Historic Places
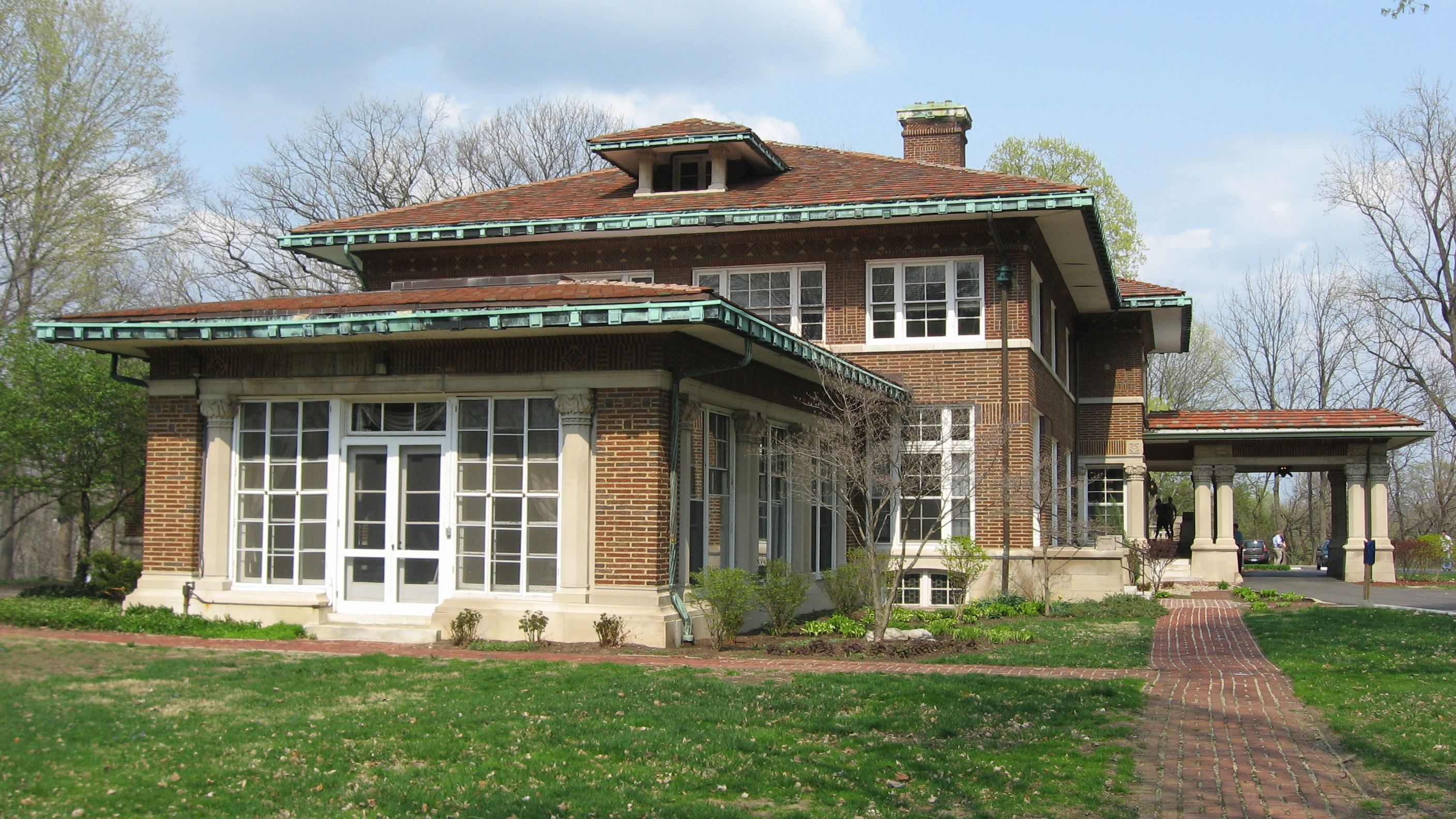
- Allison Mansion, April 2011

- Location within Indianapolis Location within Indiana Location within the United States
- Location: 3200 Cold Spring Rd., Indianapolis, Indiana
- Coordinates: 39°48′22″N 86°12′5″W
- Area: 4 acres (1.6 ha)
- Built: 1911-1914
- Architect: Bass, H.
- Architectural style: Bungalow/craftsman
- NRHP reference No.: 70000006
- Added to NRHP: December 18, 1970

Allison Mansion, also known as Riverdale, is a historic home located on the campus of Marian University at Indianapolis, Indiana. It was built between 1911 and 1914, and is a large two-story, Arts and Crafts style red brick mansion with a red tile roof. The house features a sunken conservatory, porte cochere, and sunken white marble aviary.

The house was built by businessman and auto racing pioneer James A. Allison.

It was added to the National Register of Historic Places in 1970.

== See also ==
- National Register of Historic Places listings in Marion County, Indiana
