= Fisher Automobile Company =

Fisher Automobile Company, was an automobile dealership in Indianapolis, Indiana. It carried multiple models of Oldsmobiles, Reos, Packards, Stoddard-Daytons, Harry C. Stutz and others.

== History ==
In 1891, Carl Graham Fisher (1874–1939) opened a bicycle shop with his two brothers. Regarded as a promotional genius, Fisher was also involved in bicycle racing and stunts.

Around 1900, the national bicycle craze turned to a newer invention: the automobile. In partnership with his friend Barney Oldfield, Fisher converted the bicycle shop to handle automobiles, telling his fellow racer, "I don't see why the automobile can't be made to do everything the bicycle has done."

=== Promotion ===
Fisher promoted the automobile dealership as he had his bicycle shop with carefully planned stunts. He floated an automobile over Indianapolis supported by a hot air balloon, and pushed another off the roof of his four-story building in downtown Indianapolis.

=== Sale ===
Fisher Automobile Company was sold to Gibson Automobile Company in 1911. Fisher re-incorporated a new Fisher Automobile Company in 1913, but little is known of its fate.

== Other Fisher ventures ==
Fisher made millions with the sale and manufacture of an early form of headlights, became involved with automobile racing and was a principal in the building of the Indianapolis Motor Speedway and the Lincoln Highway and Dixie Highway, two of the earliest paved roads across the United States.

== See also ==
- Asbury Automotive Group
