= Allison Transmission =

American manufacturer of commercial duty automatic transmissions

Coordinates: 39°46′46.92″N 86°14′12.39″W

Allison Transmission Holdings, Inc.
- Type: Public
- Traded as: NYSE: ALSN; S&P 400 component
- Founded: 14 September 1915; 111 years ago
- Founder: James A. Allison
- Headquarters: Indianapolis, Indiana, U.S.
- Key people: David S. Graziosi (chairman & CEO)
- Revenue: ▼US$3.01 billion (2025)
- Net income: ▼US$623 million (2025)
- Number of employees: c. 3,400 (December 2021)
- Website: allisontransmission.com

Allison Transmission Holdings, Inc. is an American manufacturer of commercial duty automatic transmissions and hybrid propulsion systems. Allison products are specified by over 250 vehicle manufacturers and are used in many market sectors, including bus, refuse, fire, construction, distribution, military, and specialty applications.

With headquarters in Indianapolis, Indiana, Allison Transmission has a presence in more than 150 countries and manufacturing facilities in Indianapolis, Chennai, India, and Szentgotthárd, Hungary.

== History ==
=== Racing team ===
Allison began in 1909 when James A. Allison, along with three business partners, helped fund and build the Indianapolis Motor Speedway. In 1911, Allison's new track held the first Indianapolis 500 mile race. In addition to funding several race teams, James Allison founded the Speedway Racing Team Company on September 14, 1915 and quickly gained a reputation for his work on race cars and automotive technology in general. Allison built a shop near the track and changed the team's name to the Allison Experimental Company; the shop later became Plant No. 1.

=== Wartime aviation ===
When World War I began, Allison suspended racing, and the Allison Experimental Company began machining parts, tools, and masters for the Liberty airplane engine — the main power plant used in the U.S. war effort. After the war, Allison entered a car in the 1919 Indy 500 and won. It was the last race Allison's team ever entered as he turned his company's attention to aviation engineering, renaming it to Allison Engineering Company; the aviation-focused company developed steel-backed bronze sleeve bearings for the crankshaft and connecting rods, and high-speed reduction gearing to turn propellers and Roots-type blowers.

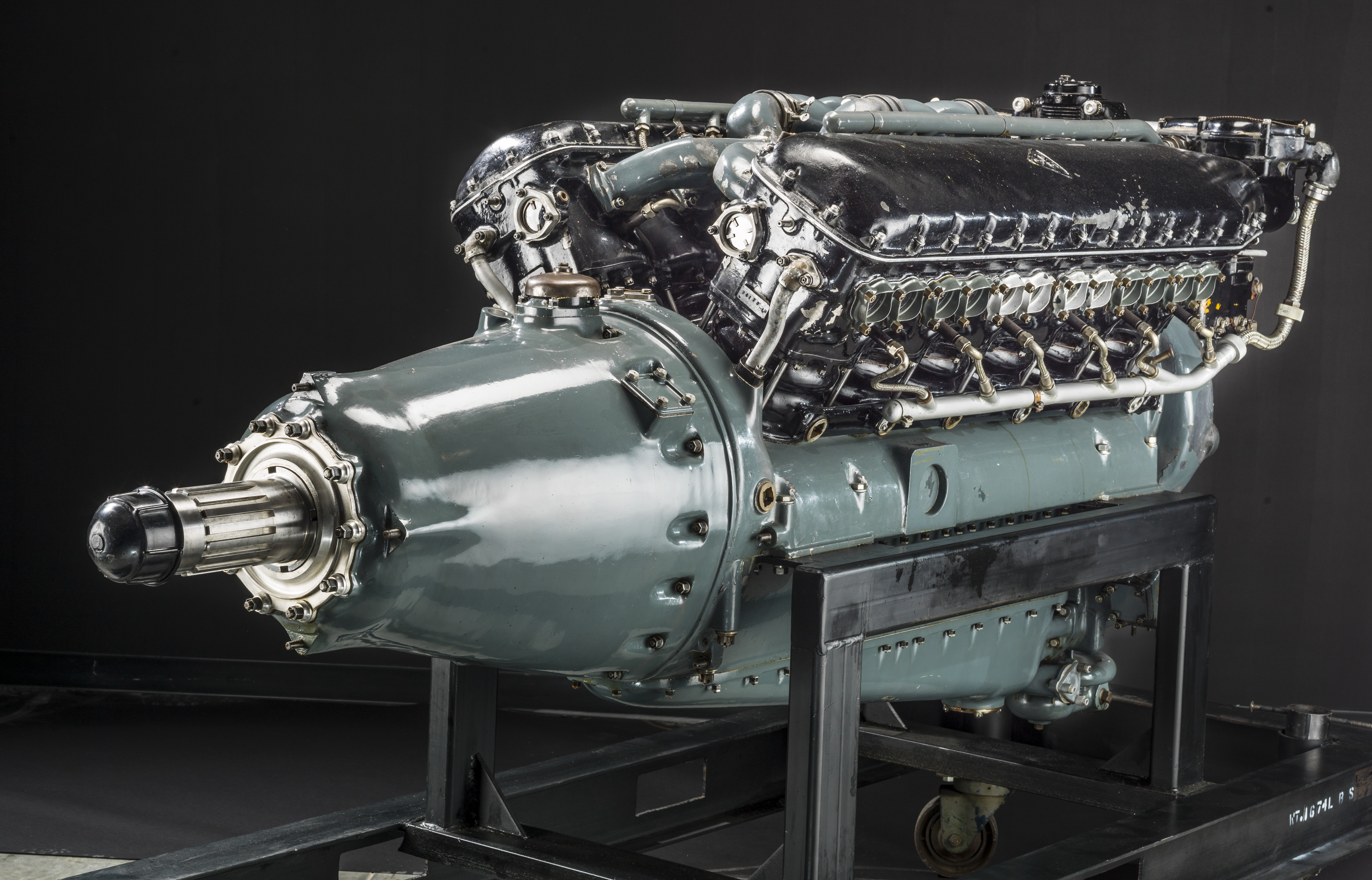
Allison V-1710

General Motors purchased the company on April 1, 1929, following James Allison's death in 1928. Shortly after, Allison engineers began work on a 12-cylinder engine to replace the aging Liberty engines. The result was the V1710 12-cylinder aircraft engine and it made the company, renamed to the Allison Division of GM in 1934, also known as the Allison Engine Company, a major force in aviation. Plant 3 was built in 1939, a 360,000 ft^{2} (33,000 m^{2}) factory to build V1710 engines. Due to demand during World War II, Allison would add a second factory (Plant 5) and 23,000 new employees; by the end of the war, Allison had built 70,000 V1710 engines.

=== Early transmission development ===
Alongside the development and production of the V1710, engineers at GM began designing the CD-850 cross-drive steering transmission for tracked military vehicles in 1941; the design was completed in 1944 and Allison was awarded the contract to manufacture the prototypes. In February 1945, General Motors formed the Allison Transmission Engineering Section, dividing the subsidiary into Aircraft Operations and Transmission Operations in 1946. The CD-850 combined range change, steering and braking. Allison stopped producing the CD-850 in 1986, but a licensed version was produced in Spain for more than a decade afterward.

General Motors began developing automatic transmissions with a hydraulic torque converter in the 1930s under its Product Study Group, offering it as an option for Oldsmobile for the first time in 1940. After World War II, Allison Transmission turned its attention to civilian transportation. Allison designed, developed and manufactured the first-ever automatic transmissions for heavy-duty vehicles including delivery trucks, city buses, and railcars, starting from 1948. In addition, Allison marketed transmissions for off-highway heavy-duty vehicles under the brand Powershift TORQMATIC, with the first TG series transmissions being produced in July 1948.

The Allison 850-series torque converter was a crucial component in the post-war development of self-propelled railcars, most notably the Budd Rail Diesel Car, which first went into service in 1950. Pairing with a GM Series 110 "pancake" diesel engine mounted under the railcar floor enabled the entire power system to be kept outside the car body, making the full length of the car available for revenue. The torque converter enabled unprecedented rates of acceleration before locking into direct drive.

=== V-Drive ===
At approximately the same time the CD-850 was going into production, GMC Truck and Coach Division requested that GM develop a V-Drive transmission with a torque converter in 1945 for transit bus use, replacing the Spicer manual transmission then offered. These buses had rear-mounted engines and to maximize passenger space, the engine compartment was minimized; the V-Drive transmission was named for the 63° angle of intersection between the transmission shaft input (from the engine) and output (to the rear axle). Development of the V-Drive transmission was led by Bob Schaefer, an emigrant from Germany who had joined GM in 1942 after helping to lead the Twin Disc Company, which was one of the licensees of the Ljungstroms hydraulic torque converter. Schaefer was reassigned from the Detroit Transmission Division to Allison in 1946.

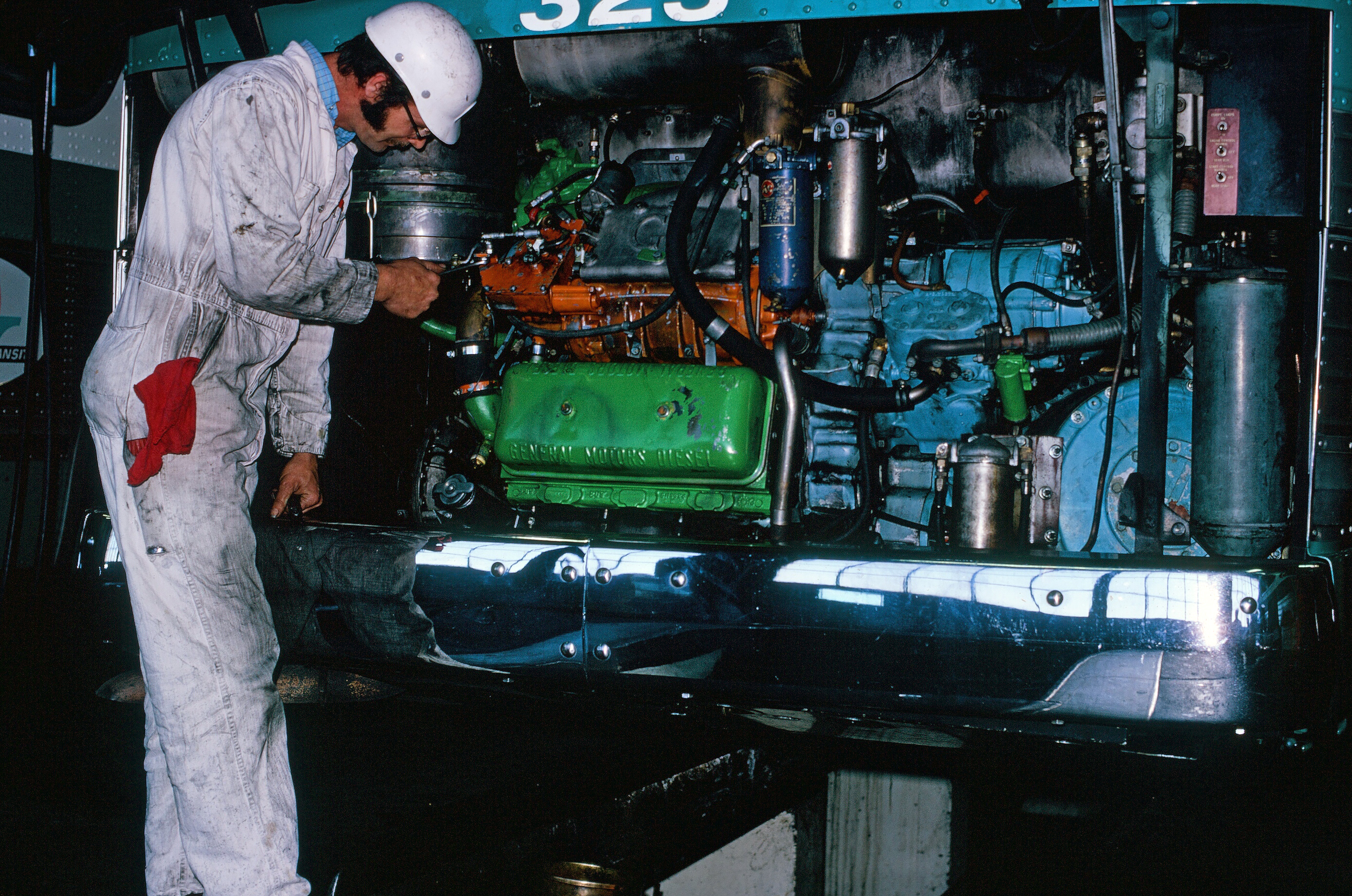
Detroit Diesel 6V71 with Allison V-Drive transmission in an AC Transit GM New Look bus

The first production V-Drive transmissions were delivered in October 1947, with the first major contract being for 900 buses in 1948, for New York City. The VS-2 was introduced in 1955, which added a two-speed input splitter; a version with both hydraulic and direct clutches was introduced in 1958 (VH), and production of the original V-Drive transmissions was concluded in July 1976, with 65,389 produced.

=== Commercial transmissions ===
In addition to the transit bus market, Allison began developing automatic transmissions for commercial trucks in 1953. This effort resulted in the MT-25, which designated the intended application ("M"edium "T"rucks) and maximum input power, 250 hp (190 kW). The MT-25 was a 6-speed automatic, using a two-speed high/low splitter and three-speed double planetary gear train. The splitter was equipped with a hydraulic retarder. Because of the additional cost of the automatic transmission, sales were initially slow until Allison began targeting specific markets that required both on- and off-road driving as well as frequent stops and starts, such as concrete mixing and garbage trucks in the early 1960s. The MT-25 was fitted first as an option branded Powermatic by Powermatic, exclusive to that brand for the first year, but was soon offered by other truck manufacturers including Ford (1957), Reo (1958), Dodge (1958), Diamond T (1959), White (1961), and International Harvester (1961); production of the MT-25 continued into the early 1970s.

The MT-25 was supplemented in September 1970 by a second-generation lighter-duty automatic transmission, the four-speed AT-540, which Allison developed jointly with Hydramatic Division in the late 1960s; the AT-540 was targeted specifically for on-highway use and shared similarities with automobile transmissions to reduce the cost penalty to equip on-highway trucks with automatic transmissions. Later, the MT-25 itself was replaced by the MT-640 and a heavier-duty version, the HT-740, was introduced; the new MT and HT were both derived from the AT-540. As an option, the MT-6nn and HT-7nn series transmissions could be equipped with a lower fifth gear for severe off-road conditions. In 1970, GM combined the Allison and Detroit Diesel divisions as the Detroit Diesel Allison Division of GM.

The 500-series transmissions (AT-540, etc.) were rated to accept input power of up to 235 hp (175 kW) and were intended for vehicles up to 30,000 lb (14,000 kg) gross vehicle weight (GVW). The medium-duty 600-series had increased ratings to 300 hp (220 kW) and 73,280 lb (33,240 kg) GVW, while the heavy-duty 700-series were rated to 445 hp (332 kW) and 80,000 lb (36,000 kg) GVW. In 1976, a 700-series V-Drive transmission was introduced for buses, the V730. The AT/MT/HT were still being produced in 1998.

Allison also produced off-highway transmissions in the 1960s, starting with the "Dual Path Powershift" DP 8000 series. The first electronic controls were fitted to the off-highway DP 8000 series transmission in 1971. Electronic controls (branded the Allison Transmission Electronic Control or ATEC system) were added to the MT/HT/V730 in 1983, improving fuel economy by more precisely controlling shifts.

=== World Transmission ===
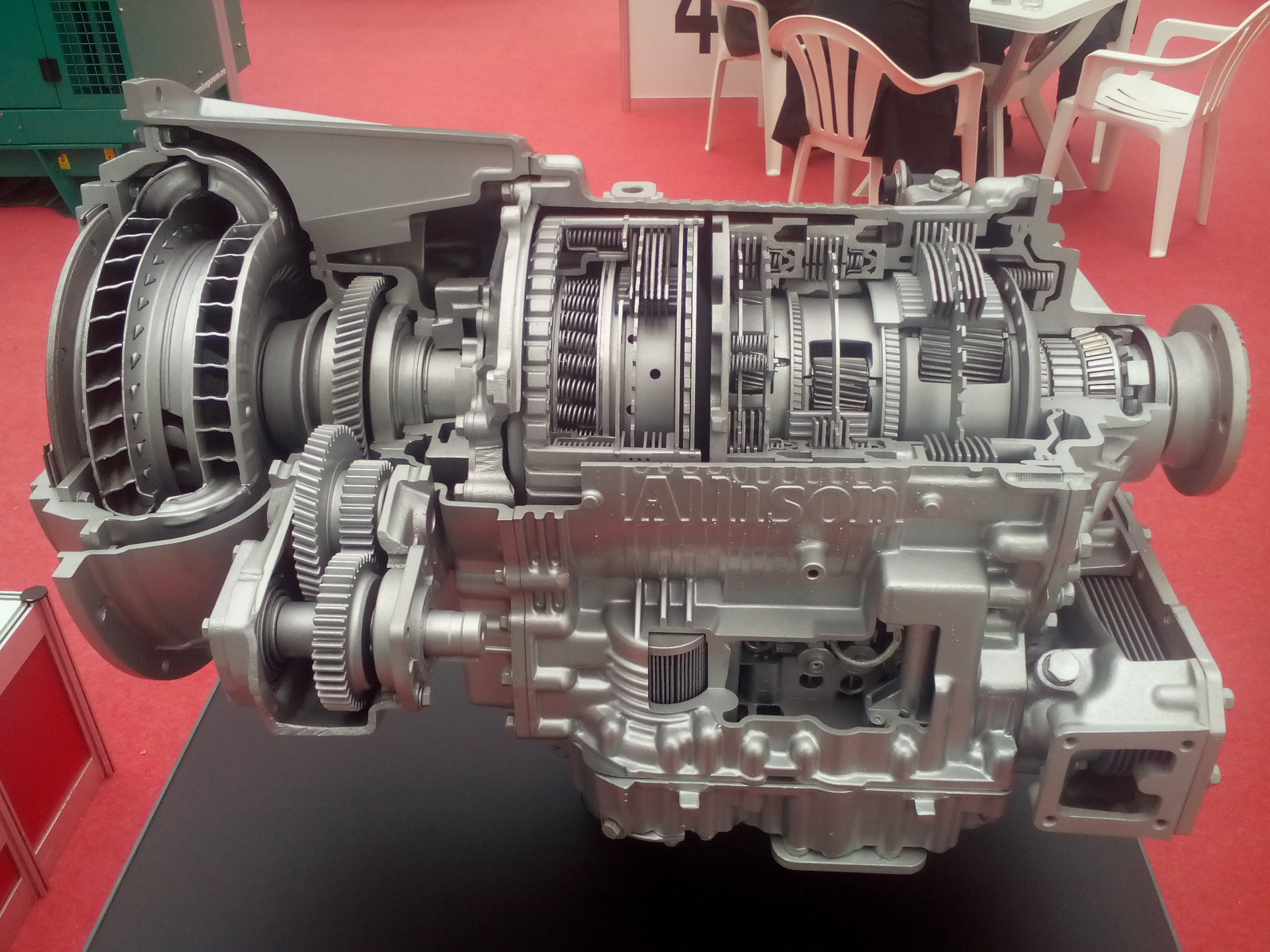
Cutaway view of 3rd-gen (WT) MD3060

The third-generation six-speed World Transmission (WT) was introduced in 1991, replacing the second-generation AT/MT/HT/V730 lines. Development of the WT had begun in the mid-1980s, prior to the sale of Detroit Diesel to Roger Penske in 1987. The WT used the WT electronic control (WTEC) system to control the internal clutches during shifting, equipped with a control unit that adapts to variations during use. The WT line was split into MD (medium duty), HD (heavy duty, introduced in 1993), and B (T-drive buses) lines; the MD and HD lines were later renamed to the 3000 and 4000 Series, respectively.

As of 1998 in the United States, Allison had built 92% of the transmissions in school buses; 75% of transit bus transmissions, 65% of heavy-duty garbage truck transmissions, and 32% of all medium-duty truck transmissions.

Allison followed the WT (3000 and 4000 Series) line with the 1000 and 2000 Series starting in 1999. The 1000 Series transmission incorporated many features from the WT line for light-duty trucks, including the electronic control system, and was initially available as an option with the 6.6L GM/Isuzu Duramax diesel engine and the 8.1L Vortec gasoline engine for the trucks based on the GMT800 platform.

In 2007, GM sold Allison Transmission to private equity firms Carlyle Group and Onex Corporation for US$5.6 billion.

== Timeline ==
=== 1940s ===
- 1949—Allison begins production of CD-850 tank transmission, division's most historically significant transmission
- December 1949—First rail car transmission is produced; installed in the Budd Rail Car

=== 1950s ===
- 1954—First off-highway transmissions (CRT-5530/CRT-3330)
- 1955—Allison develops the MT-25/POWERMATIC transmission for on-highway use with Chevrolet

=== 1960s ===
- October 1960—First Allison XT-1410-2 transmission is produced
- June 1961—Allison announces MT Series transmissions
- July 1962—Allison TT-2000 Hydro Powershift transmission is introduced
- March 1965—Introduction of dual path DP-8000, largest single-package Allison Powershift transmission to date
- November 1966—Lithium-chlorine fuel cell is unveiled
- June 1967—Allison begins production of new DP-8960 for large off-highway trucks
- October 1967—First prototype of the Allison-equipped U.S. Army main battle tank is unveiled in Washington, D.C.
- February 1969—Allison introduces electric gearshift control system for off-highway vehicles
- July 1969—Apollo 11 astronauts make man's first landing on the Moon; propellant tanks built by Allison are part of the Service Module

=== 1970s ===
- September 1970—Merge with Detroit Diesel Engine to form Detroit Diesel Allison Division, headquarters in Detroit, Michigan
- January 1971—Allison introduces first 4-speed automatic transmission for 72,000 lb (33,000 kg). GVW highway vehicles; Allison model HT-740
- April 1973—First fully automatic transmission for large trucks, scrapers and other types of heavy-duty off-highway vehicles is introduced; Allison model CLBT 750
- 1974—First European office is established

=== 1980s ===
- October 1982—A new generation heavy-duty automatic transmission, the Allison DP 8962, is announced; incorporates over 15 new technology internal changes
- May 1983—GM sells Allison Gas Turbine Division; Allison becomes part of newly formed GM Power Products and Defense Operations Group
- June 1986—First X200 military transmission is released
- December 1987—Detroit Diesel Allison becomes Allison Transmission, Division of General Motors

=== 1990s ===
- February 1991—Allison introduces electronically controlled World Transmissions
- November 1995—Allison adopts lean manufacturing principles and begins implementing Allison Production System (APS), a cellular manufacturing system; some 10,000 machines and support equipment are re-arranged through all plants
- 1999--Hybrid bus program is demonstrated for New York City Transit Authority
- June 1999—Allison introduces 1000 Series and 2000 Series fully automatic transmissions

=== 2000s ===
- 2000--Hybrid electric program is launched
- September 2000—Test Track 2000 is first customer ride and drive simulating real-world operating conditions; held at Walt Disney World in Orlando, Florida
- January 2001—Allison unveils first-of-its-kind parallel hybrid technology
- November 2003—Allison's Ultimate Truck Driving Adventure takes ride and drive experience to extremes in the high desert of Nevada
- November 2003—Allison Vocational Models are released to better serve specific applications
- May 2005--Shanghai Customization Center is opened
- June 2007—GM announced that it was selling Allison Transmission to private equity firms The Carlyle Group and Onex Corporation, in a deal valued at $5.6 billion. The transaction closed on August 7, 2007.
- 2008—Allison introduces on-board prognostics on model-year 2009 automatic transmissions
- 2009—Allison took an approximately 10% stake in UK-based Torotrak manufacturer of Infinitely Variable Transmission (IVT).

=== 2010s ===
- 2010-Manufacturing plant opened in Chennai, India also establishing regional headquarters with executive, marketing and sales offices
- June 2010-Allison dedicates a new hybrid manufacturing plant in Indianapolis, Indiana.
- March 15, 2012 Initial public offering of 26.3 million shares of Allison Transmission stock at $23/share on the New York Stock Exchange under the symbol ALSN.
- October 27, 2013 Allison 10-speed TC10 transmission available for order at Navistar
- Current revenues were at $1.985 Billion a decrease from 2014.

== Products ==
Allison Transmission products

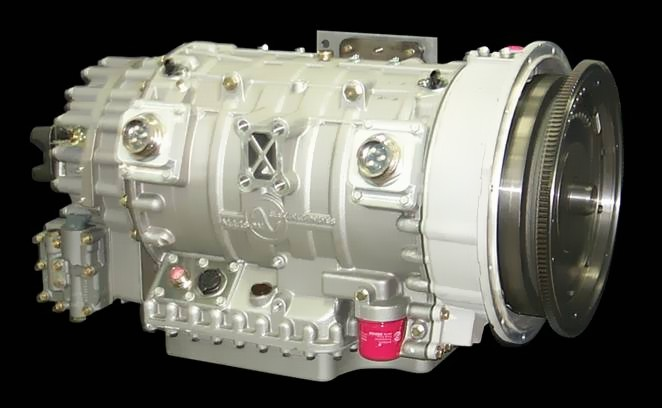
Hybrid H 50 drive unit

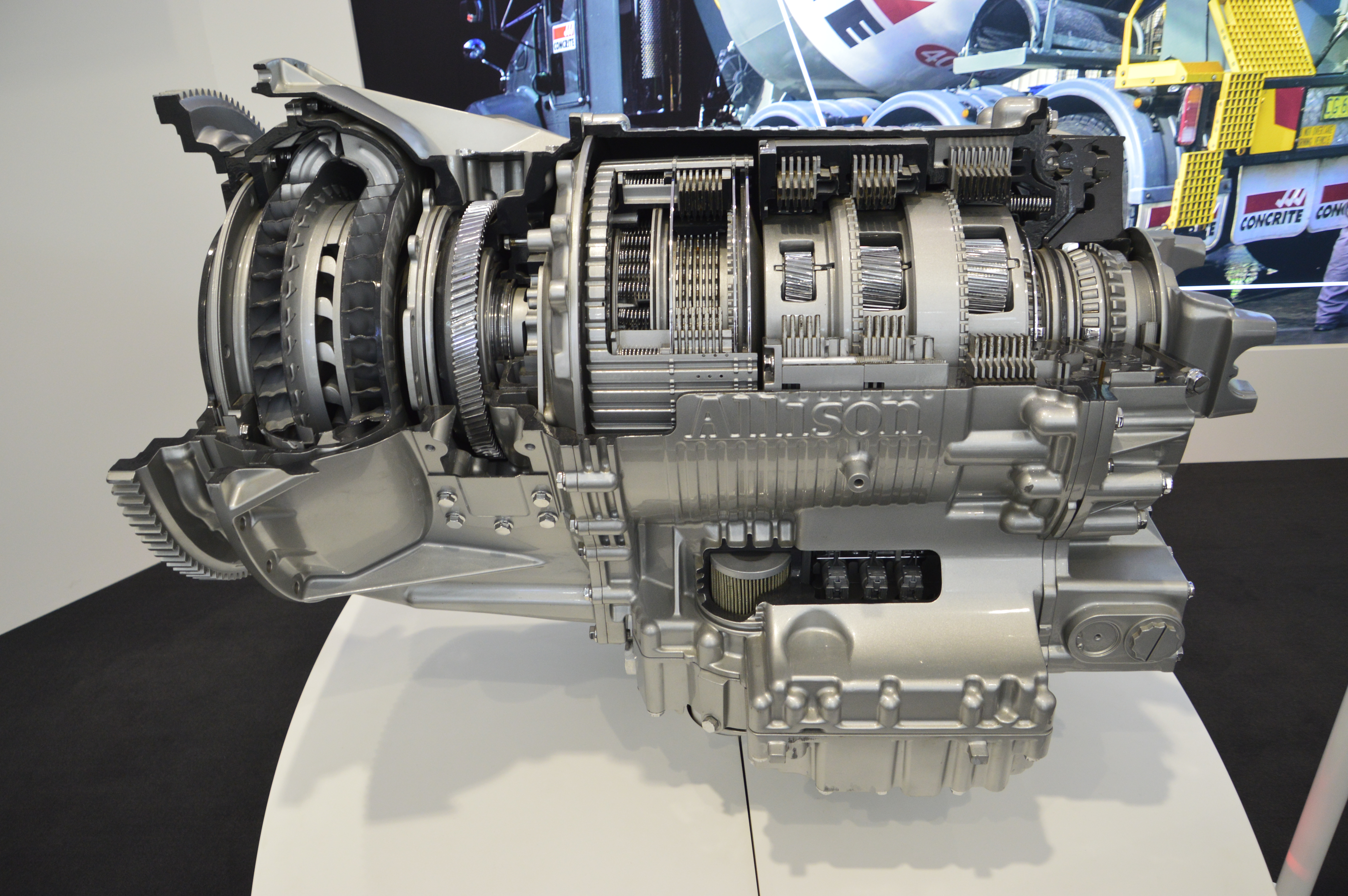
Cutaway Series 4000 (6-sp)

Allison markets its transmissions by vocational series according to the intended use; for example, the Tractor Series is sold for and installed in Class 8 tractors, while the Motorhome Series is marketed to manufacturers of recreational vehicles. A transmission is given a designation specific to the vocational series, but is otherwise identical mechanically to other transmissions sold for other vocational series; for example, the Bus Series B210 / B220 / B295 transmissions are also sold with identical gearing as:

- 1000HS (Highway Series)
- 1000MH (Motorhome Series)
- 1000EVS (Emergency Vehicle Series)
- 1000RDS (Rugged Duty Series)
- 1000PTS (Pupil Transport/Shuttle Series)
- 1000SP (Specialty Series)
- 1350HS/MH/EVS/RDS/PTS/SP
- 2100HS/MH/EVS/RDS/PTS/SP
- 2200HS/MH/EVS/RDS/PTS/SP
- 2350HS/MH/EVS/RDS/PTS/SP

Collectively, these are grouped into the 1000/2000 Series transmission family; transmissions within a family share the same basic dimensions, power input capabilities, and weight. Allison transmission families include the 1000/2000 Series, 3000 Series, 4000 Series, 5000 Series, 6000 Series, 8000 Series, 9000 Series, and Tractor Series. Each transmission family is given a generational designation based on the electronic control system; parts generally are not interchangeable between generations within a specific family:

- Gen 1 / Gen 2 (a.k.a. World Transmission or World Transmission Electronic Controller (WTEC) / WTEC II) —1991–98
- Gen 3 — 1998–2004/05
- Gen 4 — 2004/05–2012
- Gen 5 — 2012–present

Allison Transmission vocational series and family availability overview
Vocational series (model designation)	Transmission family								
Vocational series (model designation)	1000	2000	3000	4000	5000	6000	8000	9000	TC10
Highway (nnnn HS)	Yes	Yes	Yes	Yes	No	No	No	No	No
Motorhome (nnnn MH)	Yes	Yes	Yes	Yes	No	No	No	No	No
Bus (B nnn)	Yes	Yes	Yes	Yes	No	No	No	No	No
Emergency Vehicle (nnnn EVS)	Yes	Yes	Yes	Yes	No	No	No	No	No
Rugged Duty (nnnn RDS)	Yes	Yes	Yes	Yes	No	No	No	No	No
Pupil Transport/ Shuttle (nnnn PTS)	Yes	Yes	Yes	Yes	No	No	No	No	No
Truck RV (nnnn TRV)	No	No	Yes	Yes	No	No	No	No	No
Specialty (nnnn SP)	Yes	Yes	Yes	Yes	Yes	Yes	Yes	No	No
Oil Field (nnnn OFS)	No	No	Yes	Yes	Yes	Yes	Yes	Yes	No
Off Road (nnnn ORS)	No	No	Yes	Yes	Yes	Yes	Yes	Yes	No
Tractor (TC10 TS nnnn)	No	No	No	No	No	No	No	No	Yes

=== Hybrid bus series ===
First generation

Combined hybrid vehicle structure

GM-Allison introduced hybrid vehicle technology for transit buses in 2003. Allison hybrid transit bus products were initially branded as the Allison Electric Drives E^{P} System, which included the following components:

- E^{V} Drive Unit – integrating the Generator and Electric Motor in the diagram
- Inverter (Dual Power Inverter Module, DPIM) – integrating the Charger and Converter in the diagram
- Battery (Energy Storage System, ESS, or Energy Storage Unit)
- Hybrid Control Modules (Transmission Control Module, TCM; and Vehicle Control Module, VCM)

Allison characterizes the system as the "Two-Mode Compound Split Parallel Hybrid Architecture". As installed in buses, the E^{P} System has two operating modes or speed ranges, with the changeover generally occurring between 15 and 25 mph (24 and 40 km/h). Under full-throttle, the vehicle's initial launch in the low-speed mode is boosted by the output motor. As vehicle speed increases, the input motor begins to dominate, resulting in nearly total mechanical output only. Through 2011, GM intended to introduce 16 passenger car and truck hybrid models based on the Allison split-mode system. The primary benefit of the Allison hybrid system is in recapturing kinetic energy during regenerative braking and storing it as electrical energy, which can later be converted back to kinetic energy through an output motor, which assists in accelerating the vehicle, reducing demand on the engine and consequently fuel consumption. Fuel economy is improved by up to 60%, and acceleration can also be improved compared to a conventional bus.

To the operator, the hybrid system is automatic and requires no special training. Under normal in-motion operation, engine speed is controlled by the TCM, which commands a torque and speed point based on the needs of the hybrid system. During startup and shutdown, the TCM commands only a speed requirement.

Stick diagram of Allison E^{V} Drive Unit

The E^{V} Drive Unit is installed in lieu of a conventional transmission and acts as a continuously variable transmission controlled electronically; it integrates two motor-generators (MG-A and MG-B, on the input and output, respectively), three planetary gear sets (P1, P2, and P3), one rotating clutch (C2), and one stationary clutch (C1). From the engine, power is transferred to the input shaft through a torque damper instead of the conventional torque converter found in an automatic transmission. The input shaft is coupled to the main shaft and MG-A through the first planetary gearset (P1), and MG-A is coupled to MG-B through another planetary gearset (P2). MG-B is coupled to the output shaft through a third planetary gearset (P3) and the stationary (C1) and rotating (C2) clutches. Both motors are three-phase AC induction motors and automatically switch from motoring to generation when the mechanical rotation frequency exceeds the stator field frequency.

There are two drive units available (EP40 or H 40 EP; and EP50 or H 50 EP). The H40 is intended for regular transit bus use, while the H50 is for articulated and suburban coaches, similar in size and application to the B400 and B500 Bus Series transmissions, respectively. The H40 has a continuous input capacity of 280 hp (210 kW) and 910 lb⋅ft (1,230 N⋅m) of torque, while the respective H50 input limits are 330 hp (250 kW) and 1,050 lb⋅ft (1,420 N⋅m).

The DPIM includes an inverter for each motor; the continuous and peak output are 160 and 300 kW, respectively. The ESS uses nickel-metal hydride batteries, air-cooled using internal fans, and weighs approximately 915 lb (415 kg). The ESS is made of three sub-strings wired in parallel with a storage capacity of 450 A and 624 VDC. Each sub-string uses two 312 V sub-packs in series, which are made of 40 7.8-volt modules. Six battery control information modules (BCIM) monitor temperature, one in each sub-pack. The DPIM and ESS have been improved since the initial introduction, and newer models generally can replace earlier units. In addition, newer installations include a DC-DC converter, a solid-state device that converts the high-voltage traction motor energy to 12/24V accessory power.

As of 2008, there are more than 2,700 GM-Allison hybrid buses operating in 81 cities in the U.S., Canada and Europe. This includes:

- Translink (Vancouver)
- Dresden, Germany
- King County Metro Transit Authority
- Massachusetts Bay Transportation Authority
- Minneapolis-Saint Paul Metro Transit
- Regional Transportation Commission of Southern Nevada
- SEPTA
- Washington Metropolitan Area Transit Authority
- Regional Transportation District Denver
- Maryland Transit Administration
- Indianapolis Public Transportation Corporation
- Chicago Transit Authority

Second generation

Allison introduced its second-generation eGen Flex diesel-electric hybrid drive unit in 2022, partnering with Gillig; the first units will be delivered to IndyGo, serving Indianapolis. eGen Flex is available as multiple models, designated eGen Flex 40, 40 CertPlus, 40 Max, or 40 Max CertPlus (equivalent to the H 40 in physical size, input, and output capabilities); or the eGen Flex 50, 50 CertPlus, 50 Max, or 50 Max CertPlus (equivalent to the H 50). The "Max" models are capable of operating on electric power alone for up to 10 mi (16 km), depending on the axle ratio and duty cycle.

=== Electric axles ===
In 2020, Allison introduced a line of motor-integrated electric axles, branded eGen Power. The first model, 100D, was designated for its gross axle weight rating (GAWR) of 10.4 t (23,000 lb) and (D)ual electric motors; 100D has a continuous and peak power output of 424 and 648 kW (569 and 869 hp), respectively, with a maximum torque of 46,800 N⋅m (34,500 lbf⋅ft). In 2021, Allison expanded the range with the 100S (a single-motor variant of the 100D, with continuous and peak power output of 212 and 324 kW (284 and 434 hp), respectively and a maximum 23,500 N⋅m (17,300 lbf⋅ft) of torque) and the 130D (a variant of the 100D with a higher 13 t (29,000 lb) GAWR for the European and Asia Pacific markets).

The Allison eGen Power integrated axle also includes a multi-speed gearbox to optimize both launch and cruising speeds; it was designed to be a drop-in replacement for existing axles for medium- and heavy-duty trucks and buses, allowing more flexibility in battery placement.

=== Current products (Gen 5) ===
Allison Transmission models (Gen 5)
Series	Models	Gear Ratios (Note: Torque converter multiplication not included)												Input capacity		Dry weight (Note: Basic model without PTO or retarder unless otherwise specified)
Series	Models	1	2	3	4	5	6	7	8	9	10	R1	R2	Power	Torque	Dry weight
1000	1000, 1350, 2100, 2200, 2350, B210, B220, B295	3.10	1.81	1.41	1.00	0.71	0.61 (Note: Optional)	—	—	—	—	4.49	—	230–340 hp (170–250 kW)	520–660 lb⋅ft (710–890 N⋅m) (Note: Larger value is with Shift Energy Management torque limiting option)	146.5 kg (323 lb)
2000	2300	3.10	1.81	1.41	1.00	0.71	0.61	—	—	—	—	4.49	—	340–365 hp (254–272 kW)	510–660 lb⋅ft (690–890 N⋅m)	146.5 kg (323 lb)
2000	2500, 2550	3.51	1.90	1.44	1.00	0.74	0.64	—	—	—	—	5.09	—	340 hp (250 kW)	575–660 lb⋅ft (780–895 N⋅m)	146.5 kg (323 lb)
3000	3000 / B300 / B400	3.49	1.86	1.41	1.00	0.75	0.65	—	—	—	—	5.03	—	280–450 hp (210–340 kW)	735–1,250 lb⋅ft (997–1,695 N⋅m)	243 kg (536 lb)
3000	3200	3.49	1.86	1.41	1.00	0.75	0.65	—	—	—	—	5.03	—	450 hp (340 kW)	1,200–1,250 lb⋅ft (1,630–1,690 N⋅m)	243 kg (536 lb)
3000	B3400 xFE	3.49	2.03	1.47	1.00	0.69	0.59	—	—	—	—	3.80	—	300 hp (220 kW)	925 lb⋅ft (1,254 N⋅m)	243 kg (536 lb)
3000	3500	4.59	2.25	1.54	1.00	0.75	0.65	—	—	—	—	5.00	—	330 hp (250 kW)	985 lb⋅ft (1,335 N⋅m)	243 kg (536 lb)
3000	3700	6.93	4.18	2.24	1.69	1.20	0.90	0.78	—	—	—	6.03	—	330 hp (250 kW)	875 lb⋅ft (1,186 N⋅m)	530 kg (1,170 lb)
4000	4000 / 4200 / B500	3.51	1.91	1.43	1.00	0.74	0.64	—	—	—	—	4.80	—	420–650 hp (310–480 kW)	1,300–1,950 lb⋅ft (1,760–2,640 N⋅m)	377 kg (831 lb)
4000	4430 / 4500 / 4600	4.70	2.21	1.53	1.00	0.76	0.67	—	—	—	—	5.55	—	500–565 hp (373–421 kW)	1,550–1,850 lb⋅ft (2,100–2,510 N⋅m)	377 kg (831 lb)
4000	4700 / 4750	7.63	3.51	1.91	1.43	1.00	0.74	0.64	—	—	—	4.80	17.12	565–600 hp (421–447 kW)	1,770–1,850 lb⋅ft (2,400–2,510 N⋅m)	493 kg (1,087 lb)
4000	4800 / 4850	7.63	3.51	1.91	1.43	1.00	0.74	0.64	—	—	—	4.80	17.12	700–770 hp (520–570 kW)	1,950 lb⋅ft (2,640 N⋅m)	493 kg (1,087 lb)
5000	5620	4.00	2.68	2.01	1.35	1.00	0.67	—	—	—	—	5.15	3.46	500–750 hp (370–560 kW)	1,650–2,500 lb⋅ft (2,240–3,390 N⋅m)	998 kg (2,200 lb)
6000	6620	4.00	2.68	2.01	1.35	1.00	0.67	—	—	—	—	5.15	3.46	700–1,025 hp (522–764 kW)	2,000–3,300 lb⋅ft (2,700–4,500 N⋅m)	1,025 kg (2,260 lb)
6000	6625	4.00	2.68	2.01	1.35	1.00	0.67	—	—	—	—	5.15	3.46	700–1,025 hp (522–764 kW)	2,000–3,300 lb⋅ft (2,700–4,500 N⋅m)	1,025 kg (2,260 lb)
6000	6630	4.00	2.68	2.01	1.35	1.00	0.67	—	—	—	—	5.15	3.46	760 hp (570 kW)	2,500 lb⋅ft (3,400 N⋅m)	1,025 kg (2,260 lb)
8000	8610	4.24	2.32	1.69	1.31	1.00	0.73	—	—	—	—	5.75	—	850–1,050 hp (630–780 kW)	3,200–3,600 lb⋅ft (4,300–4,900 N⋅m)	1,678 kg (3,699 lb)
9000	9610	4.24	3.05	2.32	1.67	1.00	0.23	—	—	—	—	5.75	4.13	1,350 hp (1,010 kW)	4,000 lb⋅ft (5,400 N⋅m)	1,678 kg (3,699 lb)
9000	9817	3.75	2.69	2.20	1.77	1.58	1.27	1.00	0.72	—	—	—	—	1,750 hp (1,300 kW)	5,250 lb⋅ft (7,120 N⋅m)	1,637 kg (3,609 lb)
9000	9823	3.75	2.69	2.20	1.77	1.58	1.27	1.00	0.72	—	—	—	—	2,350 hp (1,750 kW)	6,300 lb⋅ft (8,500 N⋅m)	1,637 kg (3,609 lb)
9000	9826	3.75	2.69	2.20	1.77	1.58	1.27	1.00	0.72	—	—	—	—	2,600 hp (1,900 kW)	7,750 lb⋅ft (10,510 N⋅m)	1,683 kg (3,710 lb)
9000	9832	3.75	2.69	2.20	1.77	1.58	1.27	1.00	0.72	—	—	—	—	3,200 hp (2,400 kW)	9,000 lb⋅ft (12,000 N⋅m)	1,687 kg (3,719 lb)
TC10 TS	1700-80	7.40	5.44	4.25	3.43	2.94	2.16	1.59	1.24	1.00	0.86	0.71	1.96	600 hp (450 kW)	1,700 N⋅m (1,300 lbf⋅ft)	487 kg (1,074 lb)
TC10 TS	1750-90	7.40	5.44	4.25	3.43	2.94	2.16	1.59	1.24	1.00	0.86	0.71	1.96	600 hp (450 kW)	1,750 N⋅m (1,290 lbf⋅ft)	487 kg (1,074 lb)
TC10 TS	1850-90	7.40	5.44	4.25	3.43	2.94	2.16	1.59	1.24	1.00	0.86	0.71	1.96	600 hp (450 kW)	1,850 N⋅m (1,360 lbf⋅ft)	487 kg (1,074 lb)
TC10 TS	1850-110	7.40	5.44	4.25	3.43	2.94	2.16	1.59	1.24	1.00	0.86	0.71	1.96	600 hp (450 kW)	1,850 N⋅m (1,360 lbf⋅ft)	487 kg (1,074 lb)

=== Discontinued ===
==== Off-highway ====
The model designations for off-highway transmissions marketed under the Powershift TORQMATIC brand were in the format AAAA 1234, where:

AAAA prefix	1 Series	2 Capacity	3 Basic speed range	4 Version
CT - Converter Transmission; CLT - Converter Lockup Transmission; CLBT - Converter Lockup Transmission with Torqumatic Brake (hydraulic retarder); VCLBT - Variable capacity Converter Lockup Transmission with Torqumatic Brake (hydraulic retarder); CRT - Converter Reversing Transmission (equal number of forward and reverse speeds); DP - Dual Path; TG - Torqmatic transmission, requires external torque converter; TT - Twin Turbine converter transmission; TRT - Twin Turbine converter reversing transmission (equal number of forward and reverse speeds)	1 - 1000 series (TT, TRT); 2 - 2000 series (TT, TRT, TTB); 3 - 3000 series (CLT, CRT, CLBT); 4 - 4000 series (CLT, CRT, CLBT, TT, TRT); 5 - 5000 series (CRT, CLBT); 6 - 6000 series (CLBT); 8 - 8000 series (DP); Series indicates relative size and weight, with higher numbers assigned to larger transmissions.	Maximum input torque (×100) in lbf·ft	Number of forward speeds	Major design revision

For example, the TT 2220 was a twin-turbine 2000 series automatic transmission with two forward speeds and a maximum input torque capacity of 250 lb⋅ft (340 N⋅m).

==== On-highway ====
- First Generation
  - Allison V transmission—VH, VH2, VH4, VH5, VH6, VH7, VH9, VS1, VS2-6, VS2-8
  - Allison MT transmission—MT25, MT30, MT31, MT40, MT41, MT42
  - Allison HT transmission—HT70
- Second Generation
  - Allison M and MH marine reverse and reduction gear
  - Allison AT transmission—AT540, AT542, AT543, AT545 (4 speeds)
  - Allison MT transmission—MT640, MT643, MT644, MT647, MT648, MT650, MT653DR, MT654CR, MTB643, MTB644, MTB647, MTB648, MTB653DR, MTB654CR
  - Allison HT transmission—HT740D, HT740RS, HT741, HT746, HT747, HT748, HTB748, HT750CRD, HT750DRD, HT754CRD, HT755CRD, HT755DRD, HTB755CRD, HTB755DRD
  - Allison V transmission—V730, V731, VR731, VR731RH
- Third Generation
  - Allison World Transmission (MD and HD)—MD3060, MD3060P, MD3560, MD3560P, MD3066, MD3066P, HD4060, HD4060P, HD4560, HD4560P
