= Montauk Tennis Auditorium =

- U.S. National Register of Historic Places
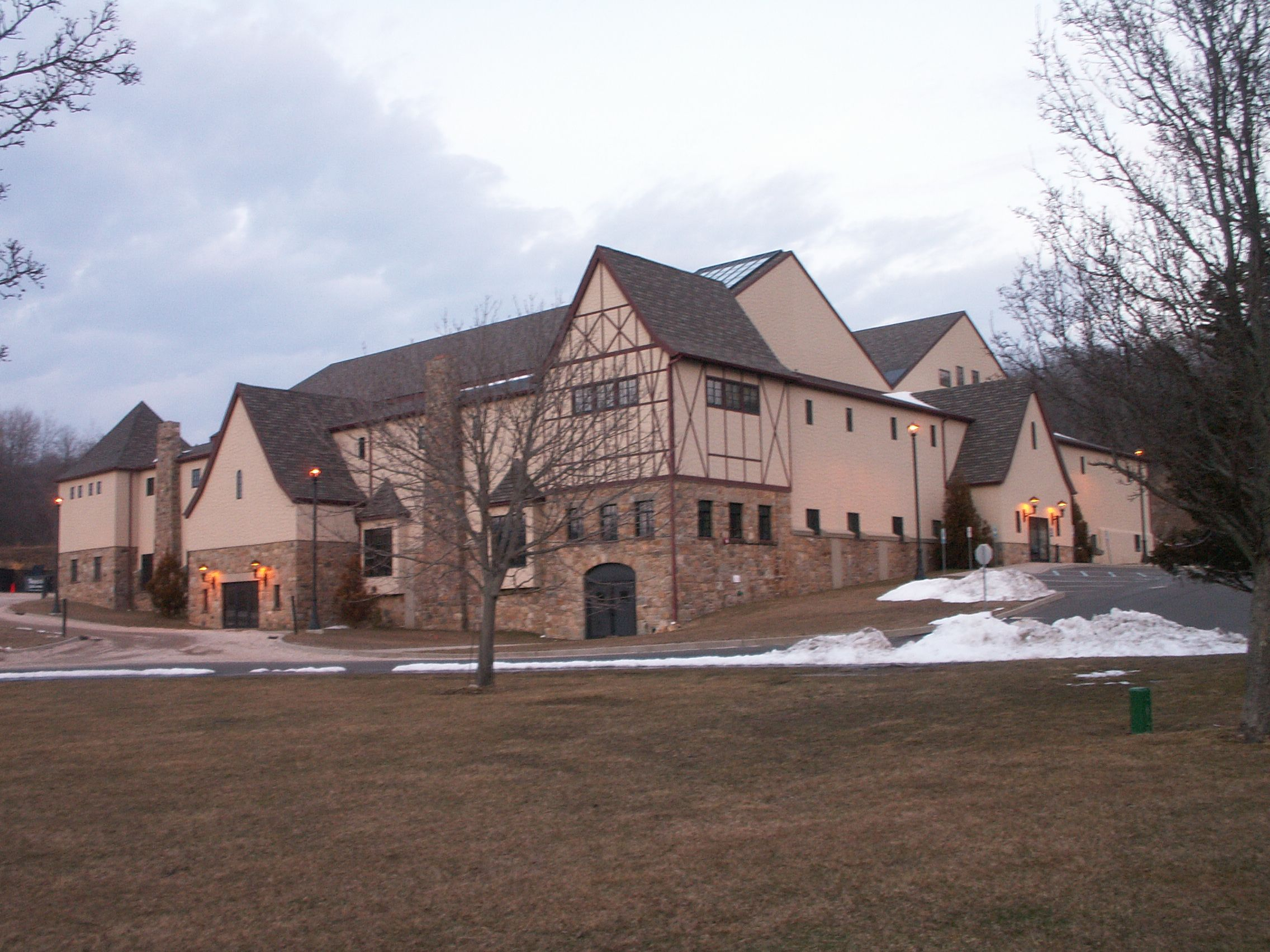
- Montauk Tennis Club, March 2009

- Location within New York Location within the United States
- Location: Flamingon Ave. and Edgemere St., Montauk, New York
- Coordinates: 41°3′1″N 71°57′4″W
- Area: 4 acres (1.6 ha)
- Built: 1928
- Architect: Pearson Construction Co.
- Architectural style: English Tudor
- NRHP reference No.: 88000052
- Added to NRHP: February 8, 1988

Montauk Tennis Auditorium, also known as Montauk Playhouse, is a historic tennis center located at Montauk in Suffolk County, New York, just below Montauk Manor. It was built in 1928-1929 as one of the central buildings of the great resort which developer Carl G. Fisher planned and partially completed in the 1920s. The Tudor Revival style structure is of light steel frame construction sheathed in prefabricated plywood frame panels and coated in stucco. The base is formed of rough fieldstone. The building is composed of three main volumes: two main gable roofed volumes mark the main tennis halls while the lower, shed roofed volume contains the lobbies and lounges. It began being used for stage productions in the 1950s. It now operates as a community playhouse.

It was added to the National Register of Historic Places in 1988.
