= James A. Allison =

American entrepreneur and businessman (1872–1928)

- Born: James Asbury Allison; August 11, 1872; Marcellus, Michigan, U.S.
- Died: August 3, 1928 (aged 55)
- Resting place: Section 23, Lot 2; 39.8193255°N 86.1714645°W

James Asbury Allison (August 11, 1872 – August 3, 1928) was an American entrepreneur and businessman. He was the inventor of the Allison Perfection Fountain Pen and with Carl G. Fisher, founded Prest-O-Lite, a manufacturer of automobile headlights. Also with Fisher, Frank H. Wheeler, and Arthur C. Newby he was a founder of the Indianapolis Motor Speedway and the Indianapolis 500. Allison formed the Indianapolis Speedway Team Company later known as the Allison Experimental Company, and later as the Allison Engine Company which was eventually purchased by General Motors after Allison's death becoming the Allison Division of General Motors, a manufacturer of automotive transmissions (Allison Transmission), aircraft engines (Allison Engine Company), truck engines, and other products.

== Early years ==
James Allison was born in 1872 in Marcellus, Michigan to Noah and Myra (née Black) Allison. The family moved first to South Bend, Indiana before settling in Indianapolis in 1880. He left school and joined his father's business, Allison Coupon Company, at age 12 in 1884. Just six years later, with the untimely death of his father, James assumed the vice-presidency of the company at age 18 in 1890. During the 1890s Allison became intrigued by the bicycle craze that was sweeping the nation. He joined the Indianapolis-based bicycle group the "Zig-Zag Club," where he met future business partners Carl G. Fisher and Arthur C. Newby. Fisher and Allison would remain confidants the rest of their lives.

== Prest-O-Lite ==
Allison, just 32 years old and already an executive at two companies, Allison Coupon and Allison Perfection Fountain Pens, was drawn into forming yet another when Fisher called in 1904. The new company would prove to be the biggest yet, the producer of the first viable headlight for automobiles. Based on carbide lamps that produced acetylene gas as electric headlights were years from introduction, the new technology utilized brass canisters of the compressed gas funneled to the headlight through tubing. Fisher had met Percy "Fred" Avery, the holder of the patent for the product, and the three of them formed Concentrated Acetylene Company in September 1904. They called their product "Prest-O-Lite," which became the company's name when Avery parted with the firm in 1906. The partners hit the market with perfect timing as the automobile industry was growing rapidly and the ability to see at night was naturally a great benefit. Prest-O-Lite brought the already successful Allison and Fisher wealth well beyond what they had enjoyed earlier. When they sold the firm to Union Carbide in 1917 Allison reaped several million dollars.

== Allison and Fisher ==
Allison and Fisher continued to build businesses together throughout their lives. Their styles complemented each other famously. Fisher was the fountain of ideas, but impetuous. Allison was the steady hand and an outstanding manager. Lem Trotter, a mutual business colleague, said of Allison, "Fisher was the dreamer but Allison had the most brilliant mind of any man I ever knew. He was the industrialist."

Allison supported Fisher's efforts to lead the development of transcontinental highways, the Indianapolis Motor Speedway and Miami Beach. The two men were the senior partners in establishing the Indianapolis Motor Speedway with junior partners Newby and Wheeler.

Allison and Fisher built mansions near each other on the then-rural Cold Springs Road in Indianapolis. The Allison mansion, named "Riverdale," and later, the Fisher mansion were acquired by the Sisters of St. Francis and became the beginnings of what is now Marian University.

Allison (who had a heart condition) and Fisher also were responsible for the building of a hospital in Miami Beach, Florida. The hospital opened in 1926 as the Allison Hospital. Several years later it was run by the Sisters of St. Francis and eventually became St. Francis Hospital. It closed in 1992 after being purchased for real estate development.

== Legacy ==
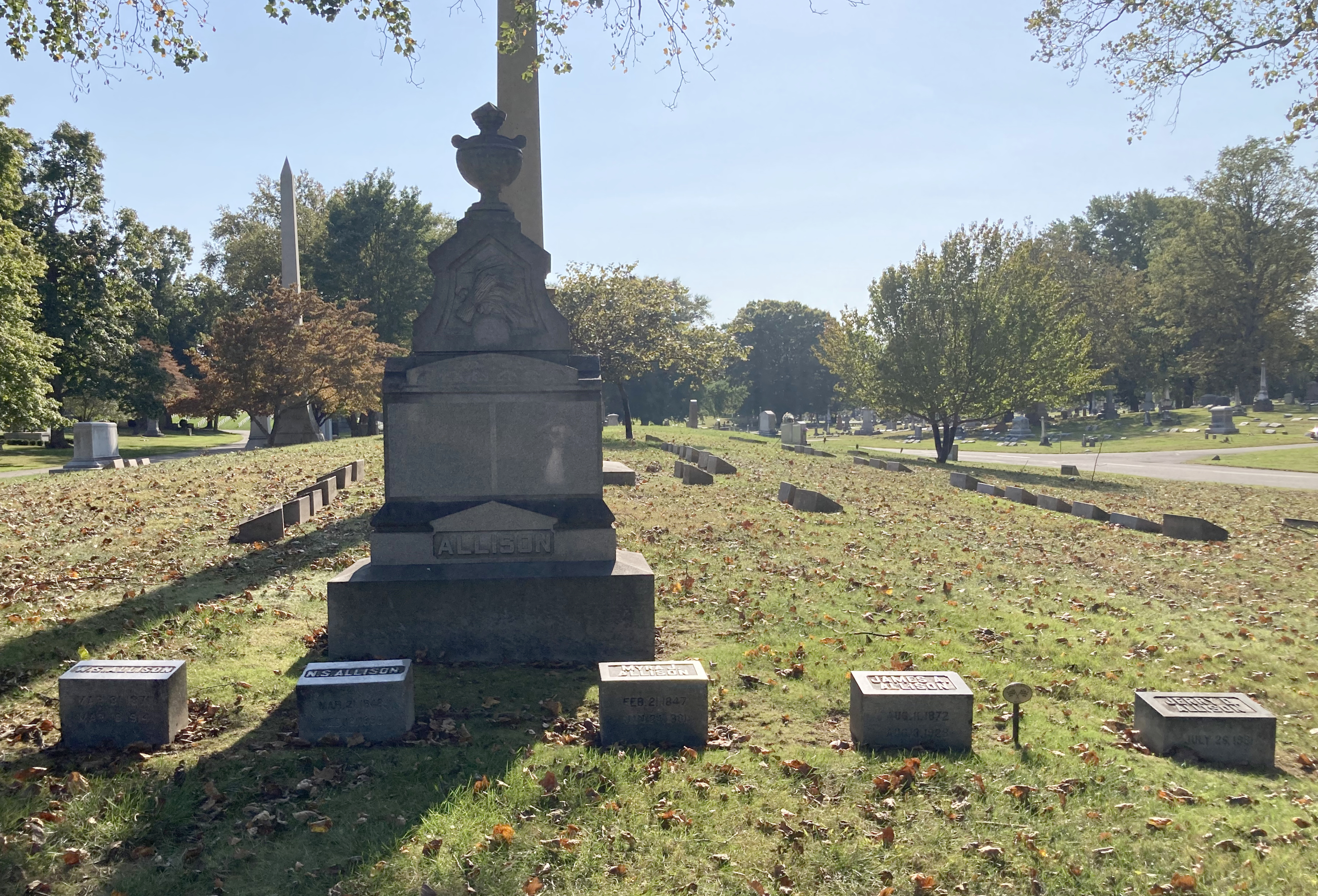
Allison's grave at Crown Hill Cemetery

Allison formed the Indianapolis Speedway Team Company to engineer race cars for the Indianapolis 500. The machine shop was located on the same grounds as Prest-O-Lite (directly across the street from the Speedway) until Prest-O-Lite was sold in 1917. The company engineered the car that won the 1919 race with driver Howdy Wilcox. The company re-tooled for World War I, becoming a major defense contractor as Allison Experimental Company. Renamed as Allison Engineering Company in the 1920s, the company was acquired by General Motors in 1929 after Allison's death in 1928.

Allison Engineering became two divisions of GM, one of which was sold to Rolls-Royce Aerospace in 1995. The other division, Allison Transmission, was acquired by a private equity firm in 2007, but still has a close affiliation with GM.

Allison was inducted in the Indianapolis Motor Speedway Hall of Fame in 1964.

Allison died of pneumonia in 1928 at the age of 55 and was buried in Crown Hill Cemetery in Indianapolis. His Indianapolis home, Riverdale, is now part of Marian University.

James Allison was portrayed by local Indiana actor Harold "Hal" Hefner for all the IMS centennial era events.
