= Caribbean Club =

Building in Key Largo, Florida, US

Coordinates: 25°8′41.97″N 80°23′48.56″W

Caribbean Club on Key Largo, northernmost of the Florida Keys, was developed and built by auto parts and real estate promoter Carl Graham Fisher in 1938.

Carl Fisher, considered a genius as a promoter, had conceived the Lincoln Highway, the first road across America, in 1913. Fisher had helped develop the Indianapolis Motor Speedway and Miami Beach and had at one time been worth an estimated $100 million. He lost his fortune in the Stock Market Crash of 1929 and the Great Depression. One source indicates that during the years before his death, Fisher was living in a modest cottage on Miami Beach.

His last project was the development of the Caribbean Club on Key Largo as a fishing club for men who were far from wealthy. Eight years after his death, the Caribbean Club became famous as a purported "on location" filming site for the 1948 film Key Largo starring Humphrey Bogart and Lauren Bacall. In fact, only that film's initial exterior shots were filmed in the Florida Keys, and the rest was filmed in the Warner Bros. studio. After Fisher's death, the club was turned into a casino. In 1990, the Orlando Sentinel reviewed the sources of the rumours about the filming of "Key Largo" in an article titled "Who Cares if Bogie and Bacall Never Set Foot Here". At that time, the property was described as a motel with "modest rooms and cottages".

By 1948, the property was owned by the Krone family in 1948; it was extensively damaged by fire in 1955 and it was rebuilt in a different style. The Caribbean Club was acquired by Ruth and Lefty Whitehurst in 1963; fire again caused damage in 1971 and repairs were completed. As of 2021, the business was operated by the couple's children and grandchildren. The family's website was reporting that exterior shots for "Key Largo" were filmed here.
