= Carl G. Fisher =

American entrepreneur (1874–1939)

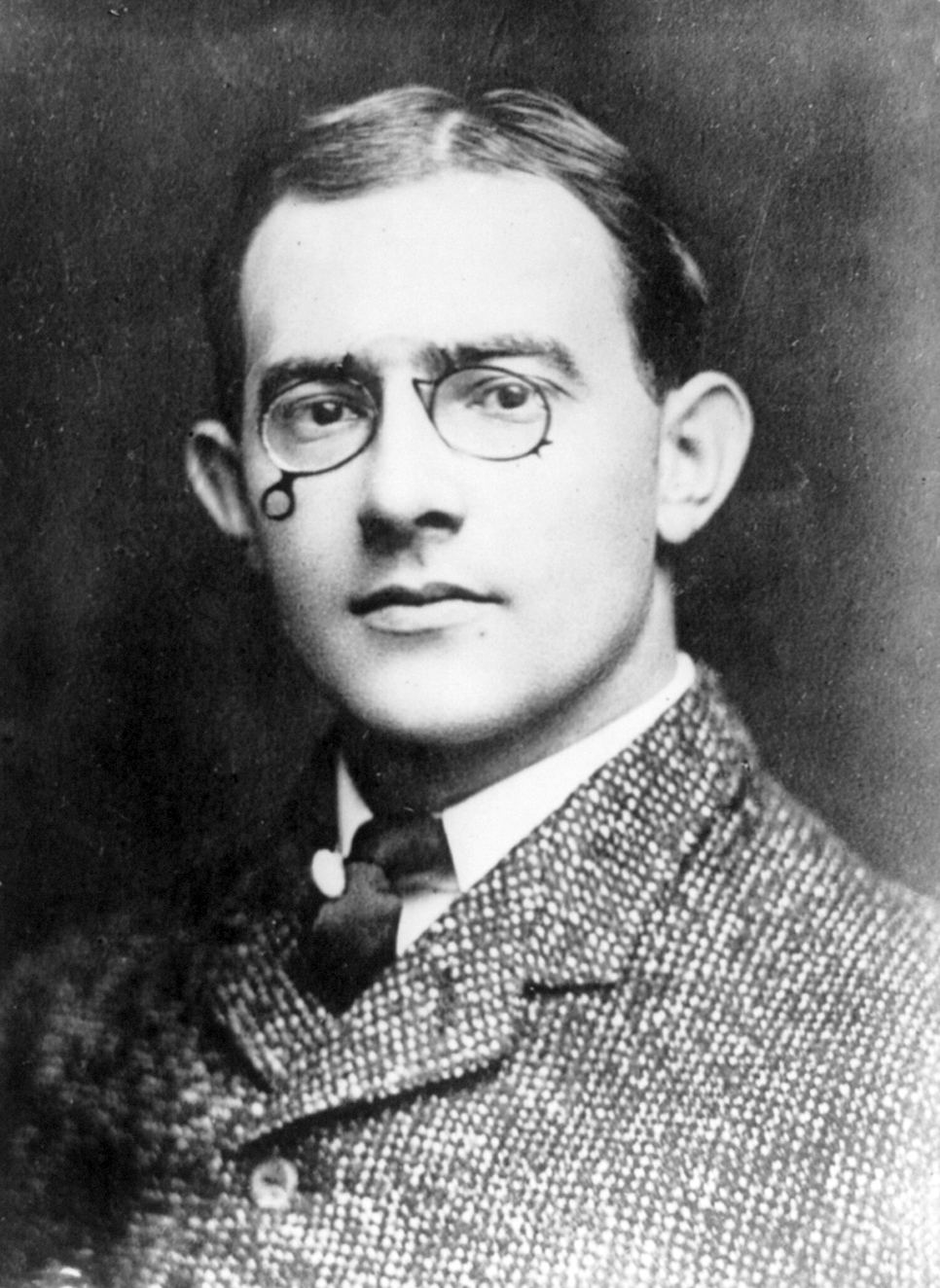
- Fisher in 1909
- Born: January 12, 1874; Greensburg, Indiana, US
- Died: July 15, 1939 (aged 65); Miami Beach, Florida, US
- Resting place: Crown Hill Cemetery and Arboretum, Section 13, Lot 42; 39.8193394°N 86.1756159°W
- Occupation: Entrepreneur

Carl Graham Fisher (January 12, 1874 – July 15, 1939) was an American entrepreneur in the automotive industry, highway construction and real estate development.

== Early life ==
Carl G. Fisher was born in Greensburg, Indiana on January 12, 1874. In his early life in Indiana, with family financial strains and a disability, Fisher became a bicycle enthusiast and opened a modest bicycle shop with his brothers. He became involved in bicycle racing, and many activities related to the emerging American auto industry. In 1904, he and friend James A. Allison bought an interest in the U.S. patent to manufacture acetylene headlights, a precursor to electric models that became common about ten years later. Soon, his firm supplied nearly every headlamp used on automobiles in the United States as manufacturing plants were built all over the country to supply the demand. The headlight patent made him rich as an automotive parts supplier when Allison and he sold their company, Prest-O-Lite, to Union Carbide in 1913 for $9 million (equivalent to $268 million in 2022).

Fisher operated in Indianapolis what is believed to be the first automobile dealership in the United States, and also worked at developing an automobile racetrack locally. After being injured in stunts himself, and following a safety debacle at the new Indianapolis Motor Speedway, of which he was a principal, he helped develop paved racetracks and public roadways. Improvements he implemented at the speedway led to its nickname, "The Brickyard."

In 1912, Fisher conceived and helped develop the Lincoln Highway, the first road for the automobile across the entire United States. A convoy trip a few years later by the U.S. Army along Fisher's Lincoln Highway was a major influence upon then-Lt. Col. Dwight D. Eisenhower years later in championing the Interstate Highway System during his presidency in the 1950s.

Following on the success of his east-west Lincoln Highway, Fisher initiated efforts on the north–south Dixie Highway in 1914, which led from Michigan to Miami. Under his leadership, the initial portion was completed within a single year, and he led an automobile caravan to Florida from Indiana.

At the south end of the Dixie Highway in Miami, Florida, Fisher saw another opportunity. Fisher, with the assistance of his partners John Graham McKay and Thomas Walkling, became involved in the real-estate development of a largely unpopulated barrier island near Miami. They invested in land and dredging, promoted deed restrictions, and provided much-needed working capital to the earlier Lummus and Collins family pioneers to develop Miami Beach. For example, Fisher funded completion on the first bridge to link Miami to Miami Beach. The new Collins Bridge crossed Biscayne Bay directly at the terminus of the Dixie Highway. Cars were charged a toll to cross.

Fisher is one of the best-known promoters of the Florida land boom of the 1920s, which inculcated racial deed restrictions into Florida culture for decades. Prior to the hurricane in September 1926, he was worth an estimated $50–100 million depending on the source. This unforeseen storm reduced Miami Beach to rubble. Fisher's financial endeavors never fully recovered.

His next major project, Montauk, was envisioned as the "Miami Beach of the North." It was to be located at on the eastern tip of Long Island, New York. It was cut short by Fisher's losses in the Florida land-boom bust, the Great Depression of 1929, his divorce, and alcoholism.

After his fortune was lost, he lived in a small cottage in Miami Beach, doing minor work for old friends. He took on one more project, the Caribbean Club on Key Largo, intended as a "poor man's retreat." He was inducted into the Automotive Hall of Fame in 1971. Just south of Miami Beach, Fisher Island is named for him and is one of the wealthiest and most exclusive residential areas in the United States. It is built on a parcel that is a combination of "the old Vanderbilt estate" bought from Fisher and a municipal trash dump.

== Private life ==
Carl Fisher was born in Greensburg, Indiana, nine years after the end of the American Civil War, the son of Albert H. and Ida Graham Fisher. Apparently suffering from alcoholism, a problem which also plagued Carl later in life, his father left the family when he was a child. Severely astigmatic, he had difficulty paying attention in school, as uncorrected astigmatism can cause headaches, eyestrain, and blurred vision at all distances. He quit school when he was 12 years old to help support his family.

For the next five years, Fisher held a number of jobs. He worked in a grocery and a bookstore, then later he sold newspapers, books, tobacco, candy, and other items on trains departing Indianapolis, a major railroad center not far from Greensburg. He opened a bicycle repair shop in 1891 with his two brothers. A successful entrepreneur, he expanded his business and became involved in bicycle racing and later, automobile racing. During his many promotional stunts, he was frequently injured on the dirt and gravel roadways, leading him to become one of the early developers of automotive safety features. A highly publicized stunt involved dropping a bicycle from the roof of the tallest building in Indianapolis, which brought on a confrontation with the police.

In 1909, while 35 and engaged to his fiancée Emma Messing, Fisher met and married 15-year-old Jane Watts. His ex-fiancée sued him for a breach of promise. Meanwhile, he and his new wife Jane went on a business trip for their honeymoon. In 1921, they had one child, who died a month later from pyloric stenosis. She adopted a four-year-old child in 1925; he disapproved and they divorced in Paris in 1926. She then married and divorced three men; after her last marriage she went to court to change her name to Jane Watts Fisher and falsely styled herself as his widow.

Fisher's second marriage, to his secretary, Margaret Eleanor Collier, lasted until his death. She then married Howard W. Lyon, his business associate.

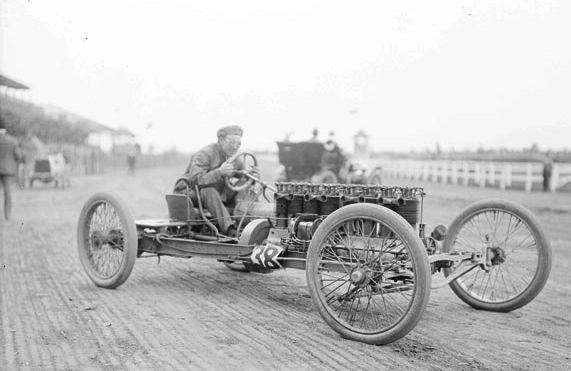
Fisher at the Harlem racetrack, near Chicago, Illinois

== Automobile businesses ==
In 1904, Fisher was approached by the owner of a U.S. patent to manufacture acetylene headlights. Fisher's firm soon supplied nearly every headlamp used on automobiles in the United States, as manufacturing plants were built all over the country to supply the demand. The headlight patent made him rich as an automotive parts supplier and led to friendships with notable auto magnates. Fisher made millions when partner James A. Allison and he sold their Prest-O-Lite automobile headlamp business to Union Carbide.

Fisher also entered the business of selling automobiles, with his friend Barney Oldfield. The Fisher Automobile Company in Indianapolis is considered most likely the first automobile dealership in the United States. It carried multiple models of Oldsmobile, REO, Packard, Stoddard-Dayton, Stutz, and others. Fisher staged an elaborate publicity stunt in which he attached a hot-air balloon to a white Stoddard-Dayton automobile and flew the car over downtown Indianapolis. Thousands of people observed the spectacle and Fisher triumphantly drove back into town, becoming an instant media sensation. Unbeknownst to the public, the flying car had had its engine removed to lighten the load, and several identical cars were driven out to meet it, to allow Fisher to drive back into the city. Afterward, he advertised, "The Stoddard-Dayton was the first automobile to fly over Indianapolis. It should be your first automobile, too." Another stunt involved pushing a car off the roof of a building and then driving it away, to demonstrate its durability.

== Indianapolis estate ==
"Blossom Heath" was Fisher's estate in Indianapolis. Completed in 1913, it was built on Cold Spring Road between the estates of his two friends and Indianapolis Motor Speedway partners, James A. Allison and Frank H. Wheeler. The house included portions of an earlier house on the site and featured a 60-foot-long living room with a 6-foot-wide fireplace where logs burned all day. The house had twelve bedrooms and a huge glass-enclosed sun porch. Fisher built a house for his mother on the southern part of the estate. The estate also included a five-car garage, an indoor swimming pool, a polo course, a stable, an indoor tennis court and gymnasium, a greenhouse, and extensive gardens. A newspaper article dated February 2, 1913, described the simple dignity of the house. Unlike some of his friends and neighbors, Fisher built a large but simple house decorated primarily in yellow, his favorite color. It did not contain exotic woodwork, elaborate carvings, or extensive decoration.

In 1928, after Fisher moved permanently to Miami Beach, the Fisher estate in Indianapolis was leased and later purchased by the Park School for Boys. The Fisher mansion was damaged by fire in the 1950s and the rear portion of the house was demolished and replaced with a classroom wing during 1956–57. The property was sold to Marian College in the 1960s and combined with two nearby estates into one 110-acre (0.45 km^{2}) campus. Today, none of Fisher's original buildings remain on the Marian College campus.

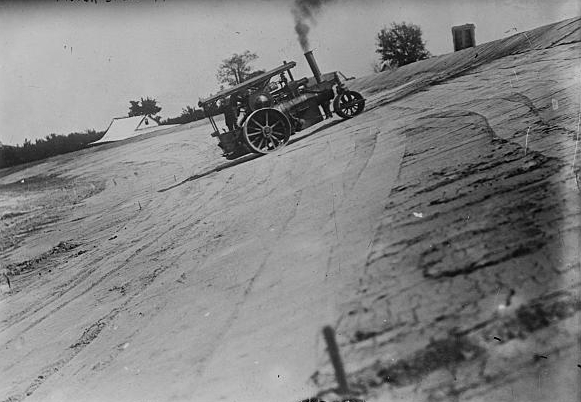
Early photo of Indianapolis Motor Speedway

== Auto racing ==
In 1909, Fisher joined a group of Indianapolis businessmen in a new project. Arthur C. Newby (president of National), Frank H. Wheeler (maker of the Wheeler-Schebler carburetor), James A. Allison (partner in Prest-O-Lite) and he invested in what became Indianapolis Motor Speedway, which is now surrounded by the city of Indianapolis. The first automobile race in August 1909 ended in disaster. The loose rock track led to numerous crashes, fires, terrible injuries to race-car drivers and spectators, and deaths. The race was halted and cancelled when only halfway completed.

Undeterred, Fisher convinced the investors to install 3.2 million paving bricks, leading to the famous nickname "the brickyard". (This persists, though it has since been resurfaced except for a three foot wide strip at the pole.) The speedway reopened, and on Memorial Day, May 30, 1911, 80,000 spectators paid the $1 admission (and many thousands more unpaid in overlooking buildings and trees) and watched the 500-mile (800 km) event, the first in a long line of races known as the Indianapolis 500.

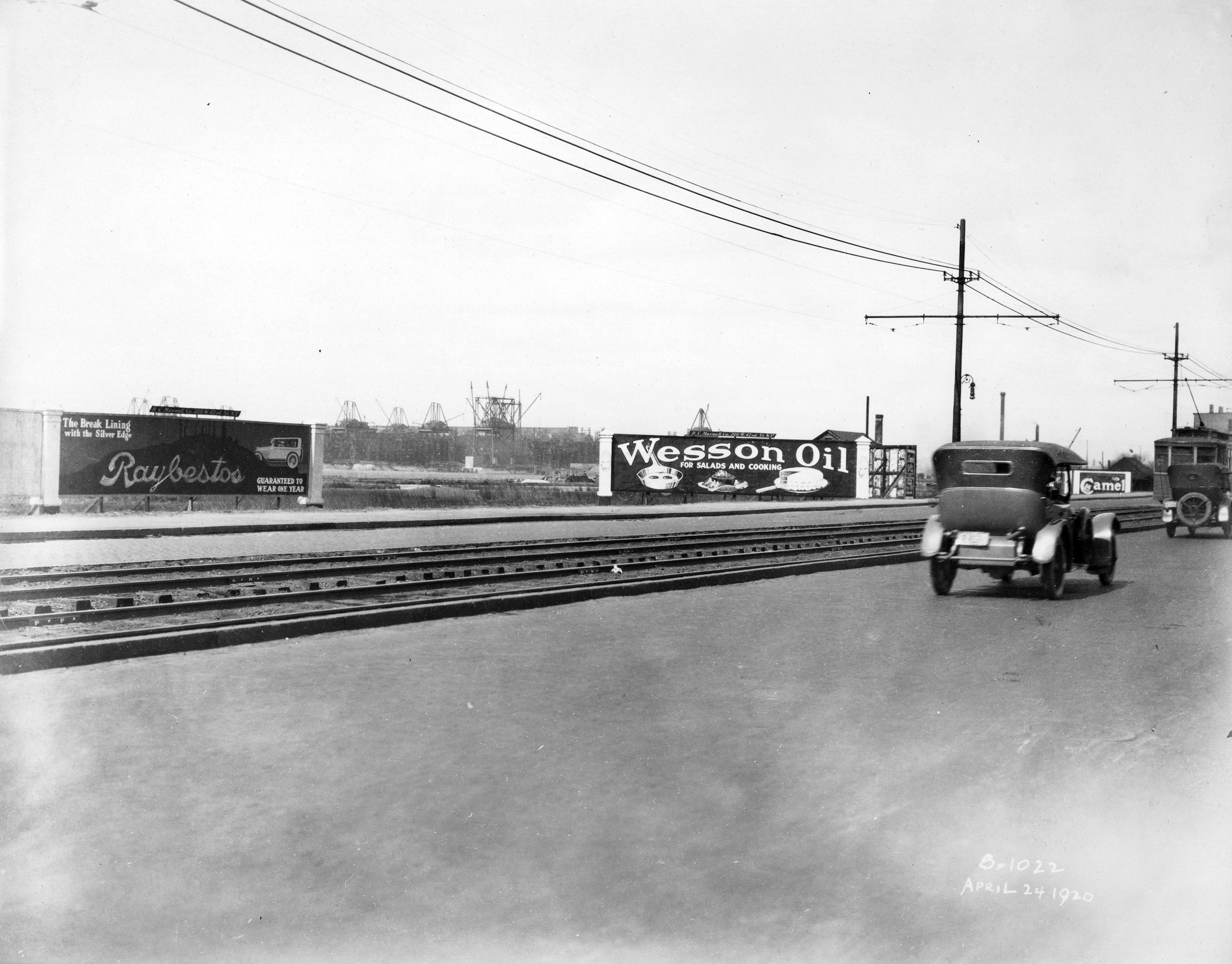
Lincoln Highway scene in New Jersey

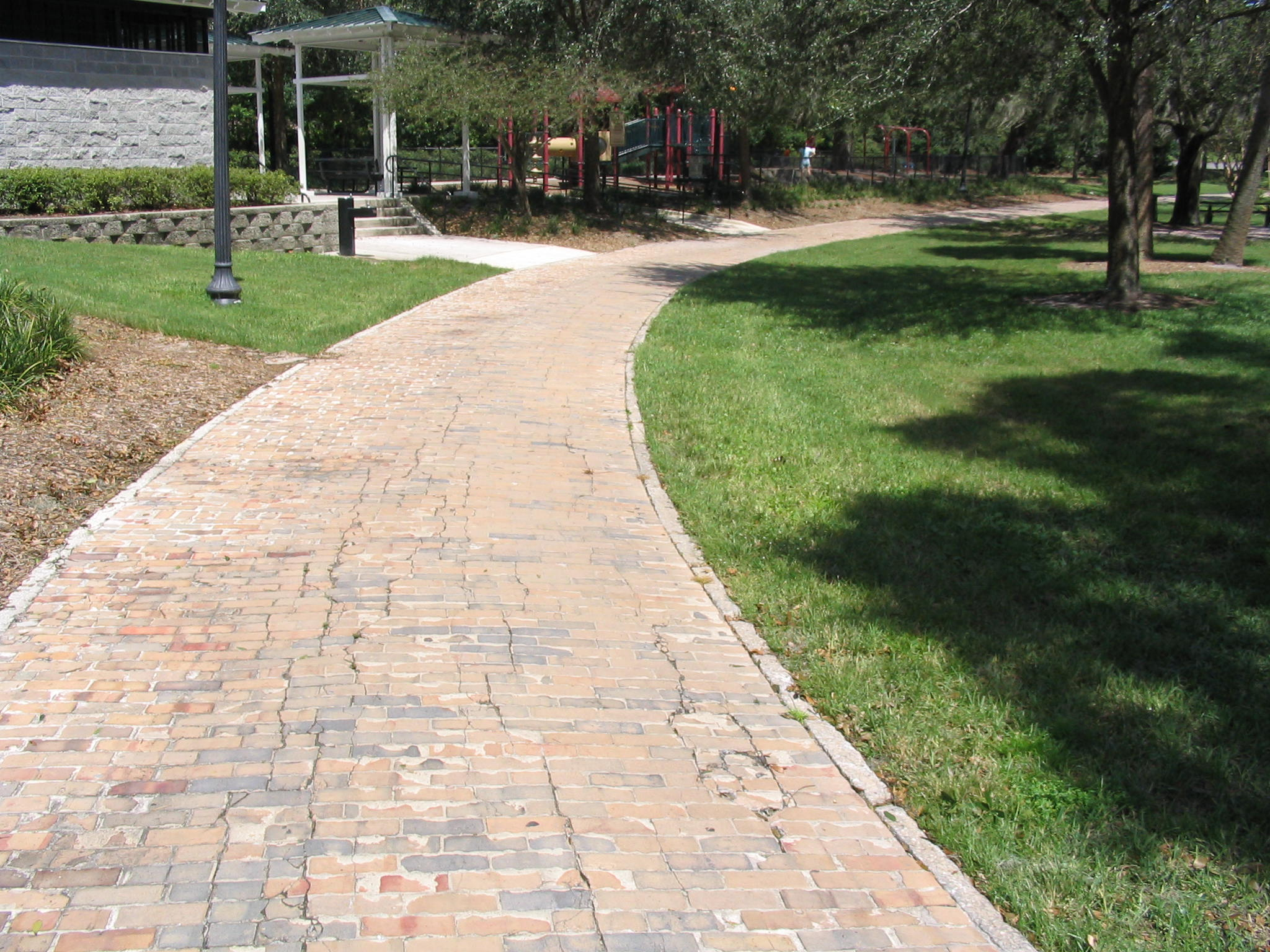
A restored section of the Dixie Highway in Florida

== Lincoln Highway ==
In 1913, foreseeing the automobile's impact on American life, Fisher conceived and was instrumental in the planning, development, and construction of the Lincoln Highway, the first road across America, which connected New York City to San Francisco. Fisher estimated the highway, an improved, hard-surfaced road stretching almost 3,400 miles (5,500 km), would cost $10 million. Fellow industrialists Frank Seiberling and Henry Bourne Joy helped Fisher with their promotional skills, together creating the Lincoln Highway Association. Much of the highway was paid for by contributions from automobile manufacturers and suppliers, a policy bitterly opposed by Henry Ford.

Former U.S. President Theodore Roosevelt and Thomas A. Edison, both friends of Fisher's, sent checks, as well as the then-President Woodrow Wilson, who has been noted as the first U.S. president to make frequent use of an automobile for what was described as stress-relief relaxation rides.

In 1919, as World War I was ending, the U.S. Army undertook its first transcontinental motor convoy along the Lincoln Highway. One of the young Army officers was Dwight David Eisenhower, then a lt. colonel, who credited the experience when supporting construction of the Interstate Highway System when he became President of the United States in 1952.

== Dixie Highway ==
Fisher next turned his attention to creating the Dixie Highway, a network of north–south routes extending from the Upper Peninsula of Michigan to southern Florida, which he felt would provide an ideal way for residents of his home state to vacation in southern Florida. In September 1916, Fisher and Indiana Governor Samuel M. Ralston attended a celebration opening the roadway from Indianapolis to Miami.

== Miami Beach ==
The future City of Miami Beach became Fisher's next big project. On a vacation to Miami around 1910, he saw potential in the swampy, bug-infested stretch of land between Miami and the ocean. He knew earlier pioneers needed working capital and ideas. His mind transformed the 3,500 acres (14 km^{2}) of mangrove swamp and beach into the perfect vacation destination for his automobile-industry friends. His wife and he bought a vacation home there in 1912, and he began acquiring land. Though he did not invent the name Miami Beach, he popularized it. He platted the second plat in Miami Beach, following the Lummus Brothers.

Fisher continued his wise investment in infrastructure. The Collins Bridge across Biscayne Bay between Miami and the barrier island that became Miami Beach was built by John S. Collins (1837–1928), an earlier farmer and developer originally from New Jersey. Collins, then 75 years old, had run out of money before he could complete his bridge. Fisher lent him the money in trade for 200 acres (0.81 km^{2}) of land. The new 2 1/2-mile (4 km) wooden toll bridge opened on June 12, 1913.

Fisher financed the dredging of Biscayne Bay to create its vast residential islands. He later built several landmark luxury hotels, including the Flamingo Hotel, that were meant to attract the wealthy and celebrated elite to convince them to buy permanent residences in the area.

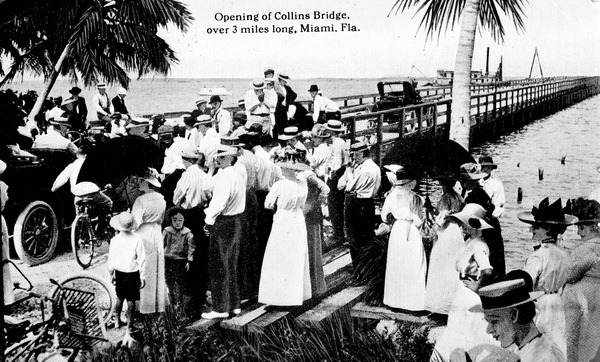
Collins Bridge across Biscayne Bay between Miami and Miami Beach, Florida, opened in 1913 as the "longest wooden bridge in the world"

Although a dedicated enthusiast of automobile travel, Fisher was aware that wealthy vacationers in those days often preferred to cross the long distances to southeastern Florida by railroad, a tradition begun by some families years earlier with Henry M. Flagler's Florida East Coast Railway (FEC) and the resorts he established at places like St. Augustine and Palm Beach, and eventually Miami, the southern terminus of the FEC, where he built the well-known and later infamous Royal Palm Hotel.

In developing Miami Beach's potential for resort hotels, Fisher needed a transportation connection for the 5 miles (8.0 km) from the FEC railroad station in Miami.

The solution he developed was the Miami Beach Railway, an electric street railway system that served the additional purpose of providing electric service. Other investors and he formed the Miami Beach Electric Company and the Miami Beach Railway Co. It began service on December 14, 1920, and ran from downtown Miami, where it shared tracks with Miami's own trolley system, to the County Causeway (renamed MacArthur Causeway after World War II). After crossing Biscayne Bay to Miami Beach, the tracks looped around the section of Miami Beach south of 47th Street. Around 1926, Florida Power and Light acquired Fisher's streetcar system, and expanded it, double tracking the line across the causeway. While sale of electric service was a growth industry across the United States, though, the street railway portion went into a period of decline, along with the entire industry. All rail service between Miami and Miami Beach was terminated on October 17, 1939.

Even with the new street railway connecting with the FEC, while wealthy people came to vacation, only a few were buying land or building homes. The U.S. public was apparently slow to catch on to the vacation land and homes Fisher envisioned for Florida. His investments in Miami Beach were not paying off, at least not until he again used his promotional skills, which had worked so well years earlier in Indiana.

Ever the innovative promoter, Fisher seemed tireless in his efforts to draw attention to Miami Beach, a story recounted by PBS. Fisher had acquired a baby elephant named "Rosie", that was a favorite with newspaper photographers. In 1921, he got free publicity all across the country with what would be called today a promotional "photo-op" of Rosie serving as a "golf caddy" for vacationing President-elect Warren Harding. Billboards of bathing beauties enjoying white beaches and blue ocean waters appeared around the country. Fisher even purchased a huge, illuminated sign proclaiming "It's June in Miami" in Times Square.

During the Florida land boom of the 1920s, real-estate sales took off as Americans discovered their automobiles and the paved Dixie Highway, which through no coincidence led to the foot of the Collins Bridge. Fewer than 1,000 year-round residents lived in Miami Beach in 1920. In the next five years, the resident population of the Miami Beach area grew 440%. People from all over the country flocked to South Florida in hopes of getting rich buying and selling real estate. They sent home tales of riches being made when orange groves and swamp lands were subdivided, sold, and developed.

The art of the swap, which helped fund the Collins Bridge, was apparently the source of great satisfaction to Fisher. He had bought another 200 acres (0.81 km^{2}) that now form Fisher Island from Dana A. Dorsey, South Florida's first African American millionaire, and had begun some development there in 1919. Five years later, he traded seven acres of Fisher Island to William Kissam Vanderbilt II of the famous and wealthy Vanderbilt family, for the latter's 150-ft steam yacht Eagle. Vanderbilt used the property, later expanded to 13 acres, to create an enclave even more luxurious and exclusive than many of Miami Beach's finest.

The Miami Yacht Club that Fisher built in 1924 was later converted into a private mansion that was extensively renovated in 2017; the property was on the market for $65 million in May 2018.

By 1926, Fisher was worth an estimated $50–100 million, depending on the source. He could have been financially secure for life. The Great Miami Hurricane of 1926, alcoholism, and the Great Depression of 1929 set him back. Always ready for a new idea, Fisher was known for moving from project to project. Success or failure had never stopped him from attempting something new. In her 1947 book, his ex-wife Jane Watts Fisher quoted him as replying, when she had hoped that he would slow down at some point, "I don't have time to take time." Instead, he redirected his promotional efforts to yet another new project far to the north.

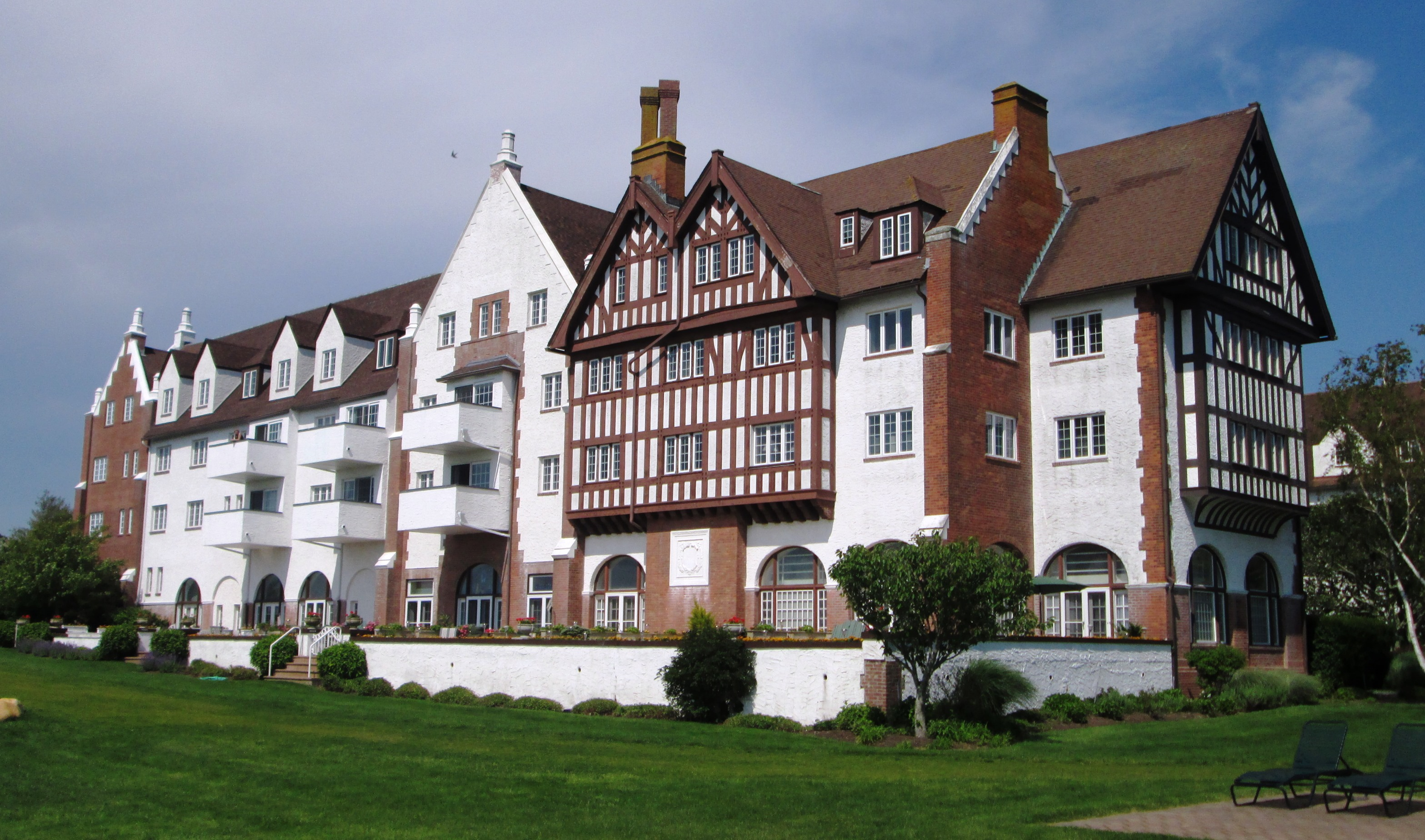
Montauk Manor

== Montauk, Long Island ==
In 1926, Fisher began working on a "Miami Beach of the North". His project at Montauk at the eastern tip of Long Island in New York was to provide a warm-season counterpart to the Florida development. Four associates and he purchased 9,000 acres (36 km^{2}) and built a luxurious hotel, office building, marina, and attractions. One source stated that they built about "30 Tudor-style buildings, including the lavish Montauk Manor and a yacht club."

The project built roads, planted nurseries, laid water pipes, and built houses. He built Montauk Manor, which still exists as a luxury resort today (pictured at right). He also built the Montauk Tennis Auditorium.

Because of financial reversals suffered by Fisher, the Montauk project went into receivership in 1932. According to his wife Jane, Montauk "was Carl’s first and only failure", but she died before Fisher's most significant losses.

The Carl Fisher Tower stands in the middle of Montauk at approximately 100 feet tall.

== Later years ==
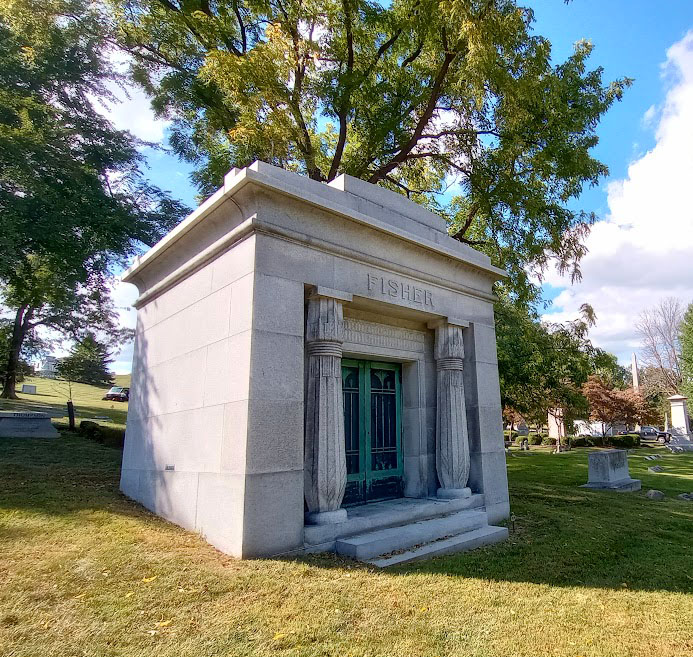
Mausoleum of Carl Fisher and family at Crown Hill Cemetery in Indianapolis

In 1925, Fisher's wealth was estimated as exceeding $50 million. In later years, he borrowed heavily and the hurricane in September 1926 damaged a large part of Miami Beach and reduced tourism. The losses in his real-estate ventures and the crash of 1929 left Fisher virtually penniless. "Fisher's financial house of cards began to collapse", according to a PBS report, and the Stock Market Crash of 1929 (followed by the Great Depression) "sealed Fisher's fate".

One source indicates that during the years before his death, Fisher was living in a modest cottage on Miami Beach.

For his final project, in 1938, Fisher developed and built Key Largo's Caribbean Club, a fishing club for men who were not rich. After he died, the club was turned into a casino. Despite reports, no evidence shows that Key Largo was filmed there in 1948, according to research completed in 2014.

Fisher died July 15, 1939, at age 65, of a stomach hemorrhage in a Miami Beach hospital, following a lengthy illness compounded by alcoholism. His pallbearers included Barney Oldfield, William Vanderbilt, and Gar Wood. He was interred at the family mausoleum at Crown Hill Cemetery in Indianapolis.

== Legacy ==
On July 15, 1939, the Miami Daily News noted Fisher's ingenuity was influential and guided to earlier Miami Beach pioneers, summing him up: "Carl G. Fisher, who looked at a piece of swampland and visualized the nation's greatest winter playground, .... he once said "I could just as easily have started a cattle ranch."

Will Rogers remembered Fisher as a Florida pioneer with these words:

Fisher was the first man to discover that there was sand under the water...[sand] that could hold up a real estate sign. He made the dredge the national emblem of Florida.

Howard Kleinburg, an author and Miami Beach historian described Fisher:

If you look at Fisher's entire life, it's a marathon. It's a race. It was a race to achieve the top of whatever field he was in at the time. Everything he did he went into it with his heart, his soul, his money, and he would not stop until he reached the end. He wanted to be there the quickest and first...

In 1947, Jane Fisher, his ex-wife (who married him in 1909 and was divorced in 1926), wrote a book about his life. Fabulous Hoosier was published by R.M. McBride and Co. She wrote:

He was all speed. I don't believe he ever thought in terms of money. He made millions, but they were incidental. He often said, "I just like to see the dirt fly."

Among his most successful real-estate ideas was to pioneer and to encourage "whites only" property deed restrictions and physical racial segregation. Fisher's goal was "to create a mecca for the wealthy" on a little-known barrier island called Miami Beach, Florida. Under Fisher's aggressive influence, Miami Beach became a Sundown Town that did not allow people of color to live or even be on the island after dark. This had lasting effects on Miami Beach's housing patterns and demographics. Though he recanted on earlier "gentiles only" policies and sought the help of white Jewish investors for capital for his Miami Beach holdings, he never recanted on his philosophy of a "whites only" Miami Beach.

In 1952, Carl Graham Fisher was inducted into the Indianapolis Motor Speedway Hall of Fame, and the Automotive Hall of Fame in 1971. In 1998, PBS produced a program about Fisher titled Mr. Miami Beach as a part of the American Experience series.

He has also a school in Speedway, Indiana, named for him - Carl G. Fisher Elementary School.

Fisher was named to the List of Great Floridians.

He was inducted into the Motorsports Hall of Fame of America in 2018.

In 2014, a historic marker was erected on 150 Courthouse Square, Greensburg, IN 46240.

== See also ==
- Cocolobo Cay Club, a 1922 Fisher project that was later incorporated into Biscayne National Park

== Sources ==
- Clymer, Floyd. Treasury of Early American Automobiles, 1877–1925 New York: Bonanza Books, 1950. (registration required)
- Fisher, Jane. Fabulous Hoosier New York, New York: R. M. McBride and Co., 1947
- Fisher, Jerry M. The Pacesetter: The Untold Story of Carl G. Fisher Ft. Bragg, California: Lost Coast Press, 1998
