= Montauk Manor =

- U.S. National Register of Historic Places
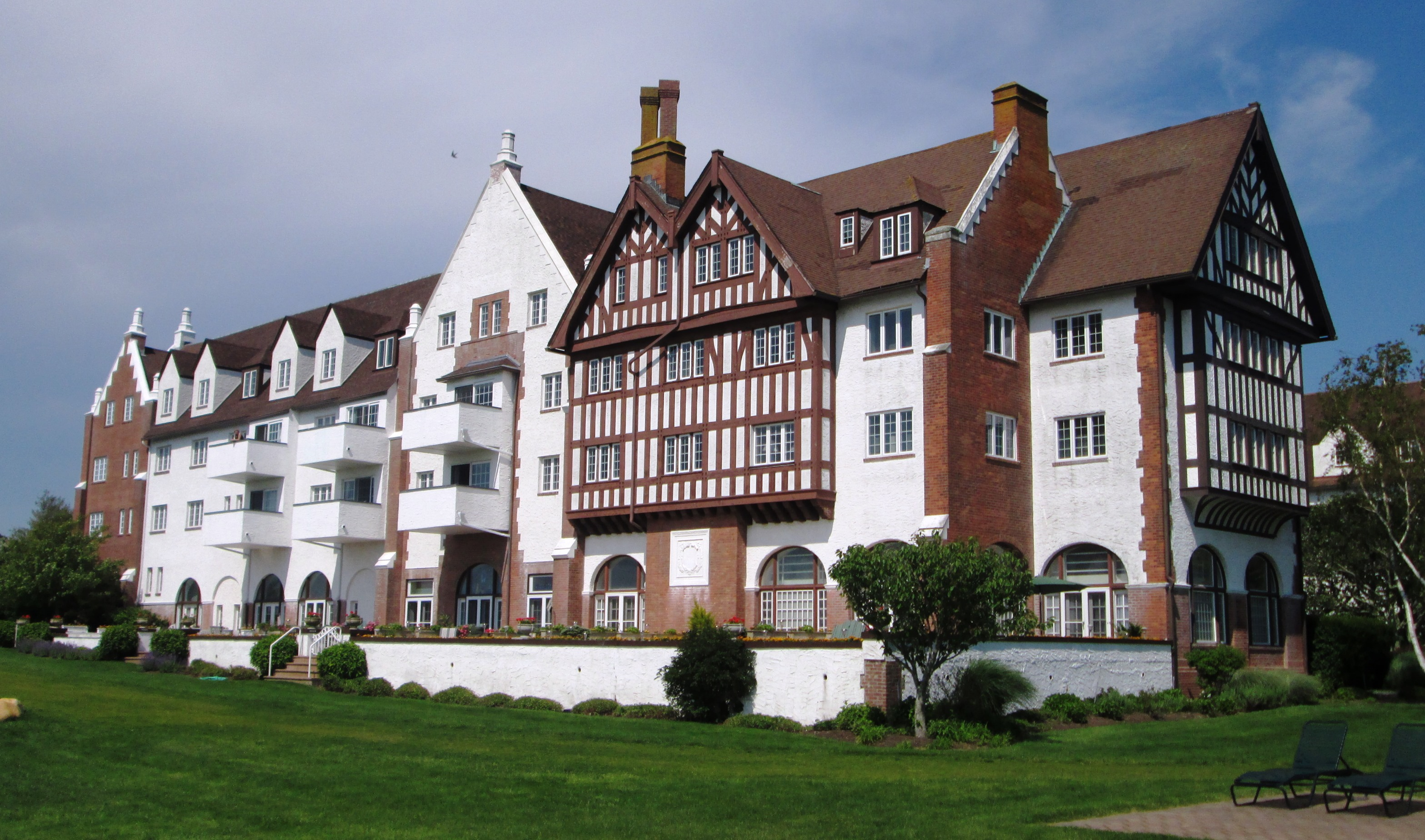
- (2013)

- Location within New York Location within the United States
- Location: 236 Edgemere Street, Montauk, New York
- Coordinates: 41°2′54″N 71°56′59″W
- Area: 12 acres (4.9 ha)
- Built: 1926
- Architect: Schultze & Weaver
- Architectural style: Tudor Revival
- NRHP reference No.: 84002995
- Added to NRHP: August 23, 1984

Montauk Manor is a historic resort hotel located in the hamlet of Montauk in Suffolk County, New York, on Long Island. It was built in 1926 by Carl G. Fisher and is a four-story, 140 decorated condominium apartments in the Tudor Revival style. It was designed by Schultze and Weaver, the firm responsible for several Miami Beach-area hotels, The Breakers in Palm Beach, The Biltmore in Los Angeles, and The Pierre, The Sherry-Netherland and the former Waldorf-Astoria in Manhattan, New York City.

The first floor of the hotel contains a variety of public rooms and service areas. The second and third floors contain hotel rooms and the attic is generally unfinished. It operates as a 140-apartment resort condominium hotel and was added to the National Register of Historic Places in 1984.
