= AN/FPS-35 =

Cold War–era US early warning radar

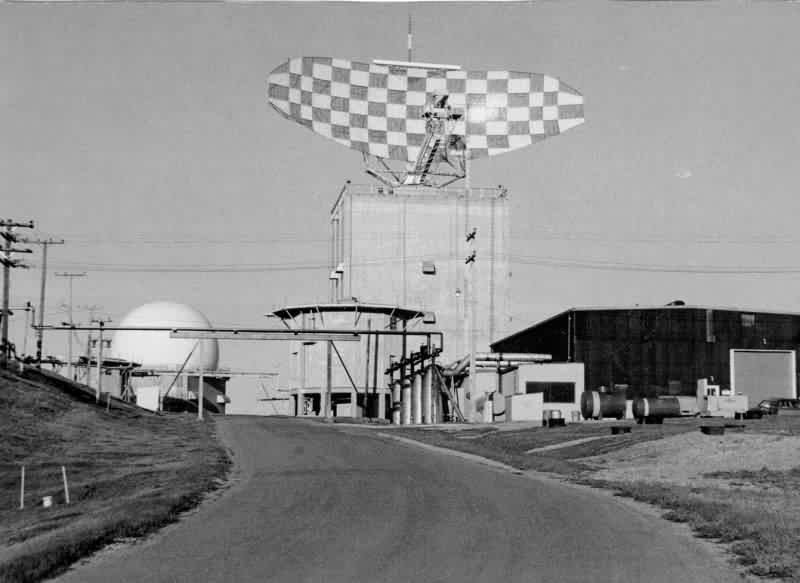
- AN/FPS-35 at Fortuna Air Force Station
- Country of origin: United States
- Manufacturer: Sperry Corp
- Introduced: December 1960; 65 years ago
- No. built: 12
- Type: Early warning radar
- Frequency: UHF, 420 to 450 MHz (0.71 to 0.67 m)
- PRF: 333 pps
- RPM: 5 rpm
- Range: 250 mi (220 nmi; 400 km)
- Azimuth: 360°

The AN/FPS-35 was a long range early warning radar used within the SAGE network and its successors. It was one of the largest air defense radars ever produced, with an antenna 126 feet (38 m) across supported on one of the largest rolling-element bearings in the world.

The FPS-35 was one of a suite radars developed under a 1955 Rome Air Development Center project to introduce designs that were more resistant to jamming through the use of frequency diversity. The -35 shifted frequency between 420 to 450 MHz (0.71 to 0.67 m), while the similar AN/FPS-24 operated between 214 and 236 MHz (1.40 and 1.27 m) and the AN/FPS-28 between 510 and 690 MHz (0.59 and 0.43 m). These radars also incorporated moving target indication (MTI) in order to deal with significant problems that earlier designs had with radar clutter, which the SAGE computers were not able to process.

The prototype was built at Thomasville Air Force Station and declared operational in December 1960. The design proved to have many problems and only four were fully operational by 1962. A total of twelve were eventually installed. The unit at Montauk AFS produced strong interference with UHF television signals and was turned off in 1961 to be recalibrated, which had to happen several more times during its lifetime. Weighing more than 70 short tons (140,000 lb; 64,000 kg), the size of the antennas caused serious maintenance problems, and in 1966 the unit at Fortuna AFS collapsed onto the underlying building.

The last operational unit was at Montauk, decommissioned in 1981. In 2002 this site was added to the National Register of Historic Places.

== History ==
=== Planning SAGE ===
The difficulty of manually arranging an interception of a jet powered bomber led George E. Valley Jr., formerly of the MIT Radiation Laboratory radar development labs, to propose using a computer to handle as many of the tasks as possible. MIT was no longer willing to host a military organization on-campus, which led to the 1951 creation of the Lincoln Laboratory to develop these concepts. In April, they demonstrated the transmission of radar information over telephone lines to the Whirlwind II computer, which successfully developed a "track". A follow-up "Summer Study Group" in 1952 saw no major barriers to deployment and recommended construction begin for a 1954 operational date.

One issue raised during the Summer Study was the problem of low-flying aircraft. The detection abilities of a ground-based radar are focused into a region that looks like a wide, vertical cone centered on the radar, with the ability to see distant objects only at high altitudes due to the radar horizon. With a chart of known radar sites, an attacker could lower their altitude and fly between the stations. The group suggested adding airborne radar systems, whose cone-shaped detection pattern would be inverted, meaning it had its best detection at the longest ranges. This had the disadvantage that the carrier aircraft would often be flying in heavy cloud and rain, blocking its view. Lincoln Laboratory began developing a suitable system by lowering the operational frequency from the microwave region, which scattered heavily on water (which is how microwave ovens work) into the UHF region which reduced this issue. Another issue is that the ground or water produces a massive return, but this could be filtered out using a technique known as moving target indication (MTI).

=== New radars ===
The follow-on to the early computer experiments was a single station known as the Cape Cod System. By 1954, this had demonstrated several serious problems when fed data from existing ground radars. One was that fixed objects like high hills produced permanent echos on the display. Transient events like strong rain and large flocks of birds produced similar images. It had been intended that these radars use MTI to eliminate fixed targets like these, but the MTI technique was difficult to implement on these microwave frequency radars, and many false targets were fed back to SAGE.

Lincoln Labs responded by suggesting they build a ground-based version of their UHF airborne radar, by this time known as AN/APS-70, whose MTI system was known to work well. Work on this new design, initially known as XD-1, began in the fall of 1954 on Jug Handle Hill in Maine. It was operational in October 1955. In order to match the 1.5° resolution of the AN/FPS-3, the antenna had to be 120 feet (37 m) wide, producing a massive installation that had to be supported on a complex steel truss work tower system. This system was later upgraded with two AN/FPS-6 height finder radars and became an operational site under the new designation AN/FPS-31.

With the conversion of the XD-1 to operational use, in 1959 Lincoln built a second example at Boston Hill outside North Andover, Massachusetts. This example was known as CCM Radar Mark I, CCM referring to its use to develop counter-countermeasures.

=== Frequency agility ===
During this same period, the SAGE deployment was ramping up, mostly using the AN/FPS-3 as a primary radar and the AN/FPS-6 height finders. Both worked in narrow frequency bands, 1.3 GHz (23 cm) for the FPS-3, and 2.9 GHz (10 cm) for the AN/FPS-6.

In November 1953, French company Compagnie générale de la télégraphie sans fil (CSF) revealed their carcinotron tube, able to generate a wide bandwidth of frequencies by changing the input voltage. Testing in the UK in early 1954 demonstrated that by broadcasting across the band of known radars, the even small signals from the carcinotron were strong enough to produce false returns that completely blanked out the radar display, effectively jamming or preventing its use. It appeared to render all long-range radars useless.

It was not long before a number of solutions to this problem were identified, primarily by using frequency agility, the ability to shift the frequency within a certain band. Faced with a radar that can operate across such a selection of frequencies, the jammer is forced to send out signals on all of these, a concept known as barrage jamming. In doing so they guarantee coverage of the frequency the radar is operating on, but at the same time the energy on the narrow frequency of the radar at any given instant is greatly reduced. Combining this with greatly increased transmission energy from the ground radars allows them to overwhelm the jammer's now diluted signal.

To take advantage of this concept, in June 1955 the Rome Air Development Center (RADC) began a program developing new radars operating across a wide band of frequencies from VHF to microwave, also able to shift transmitted frequencies within the selected band. Four systems were outlined, the General Electric AN/FPS-24 that operated in the VHF range between 214 and 236 MHz (1.40 and 1.27 m), Sperry's AN/FPS-35 in the UHF range between 400 and 450 MHz (0.75 and 0.67 m), the Raytheon AN/FPS-28 also in the UHF band from 510 to 690 MHz (0.59 to 0.43 m), and the Westinghouse 3-dimensional radar AN/FPS-27 in the S-band from 2,320 to 2,680 MHz (0.129 to 0.112 m). By deploying these radars so they overlapped each other's frequencies, an attacker would have to carry a variety of carcinotron transmitters to effectively jam these widely separated bands. As the size of the carcinotron is a function of wavelength, ones for the lower VHF and UHF frequencies would be large, reducing the aircraft's payload for weapons.

The FPS-35's basic design parameters were based on the FPS-31, but ended up being a very different product. Among the more obvious changes were a new parabolic reflector design, and a new massive bearing system to rotate it. RADC placed a contract for four prototype units to be installed at existing Air Force bases.

== Overview ==
Sperry built 12 of the long range radars, detecting objects 200 miles (320 km) away, in the 1960s. They were to succeed existing Semi Automatic Ground Environment (SAGE) radars providing enhanced electronic countermeasures (ECM). Operating from 420 to 450 MHz (0.71 to 0.67 m) resulted in using antennas that weighed between 70 and 80 short tons (64 and 73 t), exhibiting numerous problems. The concrete tower bases were 84 feet 6 inches (25.76 m) high, with 5 floors, measuring 60 feet 3 inches (18.36 m) square in side dimensions.

The prototype was developed at the Thomasville Aircraft Control and Warning Station in Thomasville, Alabama.

The 85-foot (26 m) enclosed radar towers supporting all 12 of the FPS-35 antennas were prominent landmarks. All were of the same basic design with ten constructed primarily from concrete and two based on a steel frame structure (sites Baker and Finley). Only the radar tower at Baker has been demolished.

The 23 radar towers used by the AN/FPS-24 and the AN/FPS-35 radar sets were of similar designs (concrete or steel frame) and were designed under direction of RADC. The radar tower at Thomasville has an RADC plaque next to one from Sperry Corporation. Only the FPS-35 tower at Baker included a radome protecting the antenna. This radome was attached to a separate steel tower called a Radome Support Structure (RSS) surrounding the radar tower to its full height. With the antenna, the structure's total height was 150 feet (46 m).

== Montauk tower ==
- AN/FPS-35 Radar Tower and Antenna
- U.S. National Register of Historic Places
- U.S. National Historic Site
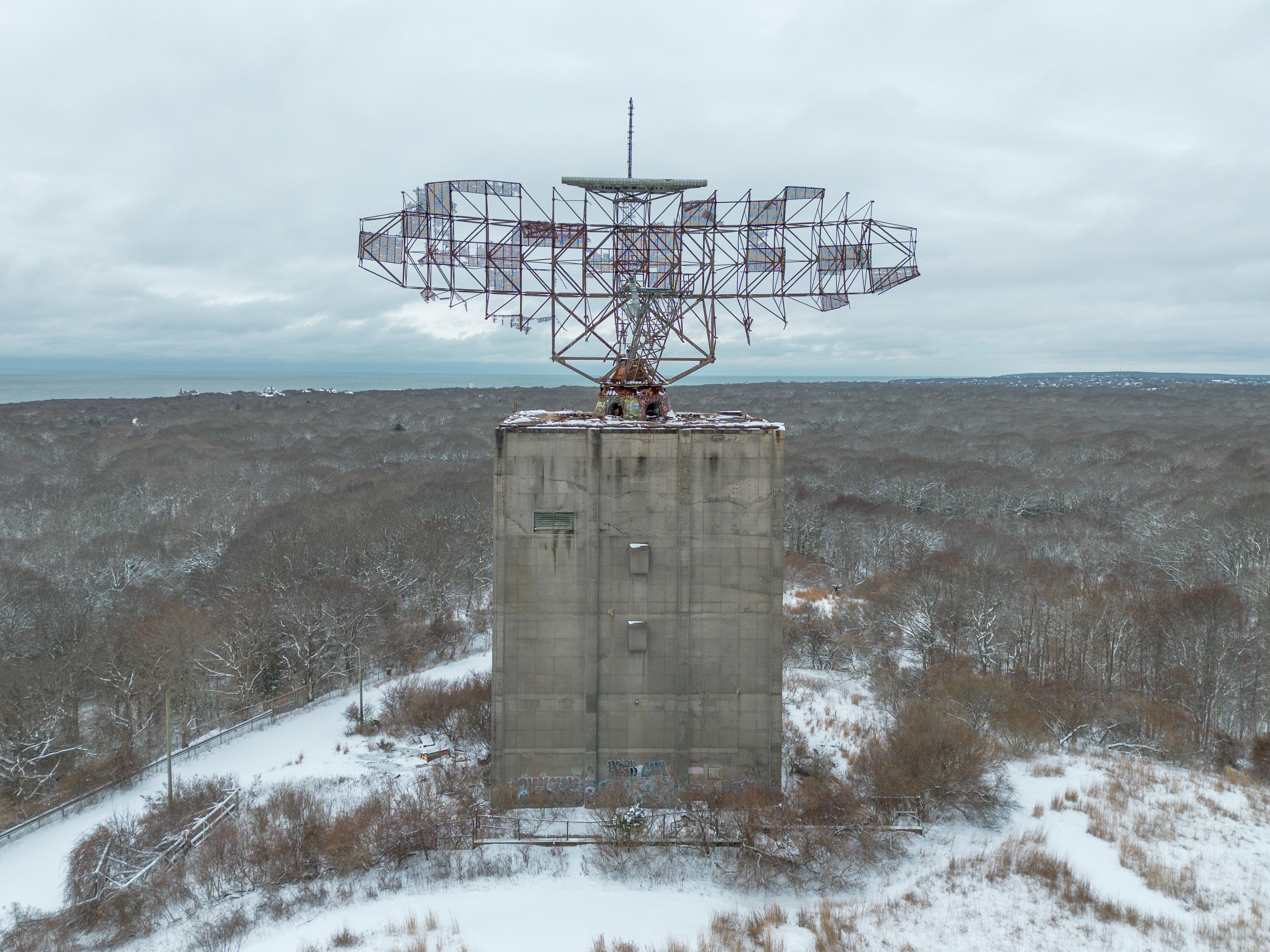
- AN/FPS-35 radar at Camp Hero State Park, Montauk, New York in 2025.

- Location within New York
- Location: Camp Hero State Park
- Nearest city: Montauk, New York
- Coordinates: 41°3′44.81″N 71°52′28.24″W
- Built: 1960; 66 years ago
- NRHP reference No.: 02000615

Significant dates
- Added to NRHP: June 4, 2002
- Designated NHS: June 4, 2002

All of the FPS-35 radars have been dismantled except for the one at Camp Hero State Park on the eastern tip of Long Island in Montauk, New York. It was the last to operate, shutting down in January 1981, and the radar tower is the only one still with an antenna on the roof. The tower also contains some of the radar set equipment and cabinets. The antenna was repaired with parts from the Sault Ste. Marie station after it closed in October 1979. The Montauk antenna is very corroded and can not be rotated.

The structure was listed on the National Register of Historic Places in 2002. Fishermen on the Atlantic Ocean and Block Island Sound lobbied to save it since the massive radar tower was a better daytime landmark than the Montauk Point Lighthouse.

The 150-foot (46 m) tower dominates the environs able to be seen from as far away as Charlestown, Rhode Island, 22 miles (35 km) to the east and Orient Point, New York 20 miles (32 km) to the west.

The Montauk radar has worked its way into a conspiracy theory that it was used in time travel experiments called the Montauk Project.

== List of towers ==
- Thomasville, Alabama 31.9382°N 87.7502°W
- Boron, California 35.0823°N 117.5823°W
- Sault Ste. Marie, Michigan 46.4565°N 84.3878°W
- Selfridge AFB near Detroit, Michigan 42.6275°N 82.8300°W
- Fallon, Nevada 39.4054°N 118.7224°W
- Montauk, New York 41.0622°N 71.8740°W
- Finley, North Dakota 47.5161°N 97.8687°W (steel tower, present)
- Fortuna, North Dakota 48.9042°N 103.8665°W
- Benton, Pennsylvania 41.3574°N 76.2930°W
- Manassas, Virginia 38.6288°N 77.4385°W
- Antigo, Wisconsin 45.048333°N 89.233889°W
- Baker, Oregon 44.586389°N 117.787222°W (steel tower, demolished)

== See also ==
- AMES Type 85, the UK equivalent
- List of radars
- List of military electronics of the United States
- Similar US military “fixed” radar systems
