= Montauk Chronicles =

- Teaser poster
- Directed by: Christopher Garetano
- Produced by: Christopher Garetano
- Starring: Al Bielik; Preston Nichols; Stewart Swerdlow
- Music by: Krystal Cordero
- Production company: White Phosphorus Pictures
- Release date: December 23, 2014
- Running time: 122 minutes
- Country: United States
- Language: English

Montauk Chronicles is a 2014 documentary film from filmmaker Christopher P. Garetano. The film covers the alleged happenings in the Montauk Project conspiracy.

== Overview ==
Montauk Chronicles is the story of three men who claim that between 1971 and 1983 secret experiments were conducted deep beneath the surface of the Camp Hero Air Force base.

The film features interviews with Al Bielek, Stewart Swerdlow, and Preston Nichols.

In January 2015 Montauk Chronicles premiered at the Philip K. Dick Film Festival in New York and won the award for Best Feature Documentary/Singularity and Beyond.

In February 2015, Preston and Christopher were featured on the nationwide talk show Coast to Coast AM.

== See also ==
- List of conspiracy theories
