= The Montauk Project: Experiments in Time =

1992 fictional book by Preston B. Nichols and Peter Moon

- The Montauk Project: Experiments in Time first edition cover
- Author: Preston B. Nichols and Peter Moon
- Language: English
- Series: Montauk Project
- Genre: Conspiracy
- Publisher: Sky Books
- Publication date: 1992
- Publication place: United States
- Media type: Print Paperback
- Pages: 156
- ISBN: 0-9631889-0-9
- OCLC: 26084756
- Dewey Decimal: 133.8 20
- LC Class: BF1045.T55 N53 1992
- Followed by: Montauk Revisited: Adventures in Synchronicity

The Montauk Project: Experiments in Time by Preston B. Nichols and Peter Moon, published in 1992, is the first book in a series depicting time travel experiments at the Montauk Air Force Base at the eastern tip of Long Island. It is considered the progenitor of the "Montauk Project" conspiracy theory.

== Overview ==
The 1992 book and its follow up books are written in a first person style. The real photographs of the base and crude drawings of the project electronics in the book are used for a false sense of reality. Using a time travel theme, the characters alter history with visits to Jesus Christ, as well as altering the outcome of American Civil War and World War II battles. The authors claim the book is based on their recovery of repressed childhood memories of being abducted and experimented on against their will. In the book they also throw doubt on their claims saying ‘Whether you read this as science fiction or non-fiction you are in for an amazing story.’

The book has been looked on as true by followers of the conspiracy theory, some of whom visit Montauk Air Force Base inside Camp Hero State Park. It has also been classified as science fiction.

== Book details ==
=== The Philadelphia Experiment ===
The book's narrative is centered around the Montauk Project, which is believed to be an extension or continuation of the Philadelphia Experiment (also known as Project Rainbow), which supposedly took place in 1943.

Sometime in the 1950s, surviving researchers from the original Project Rainbow began to discuss the project with an eye to continuing the research into technical aspects of manipulating the electromagnetic bottle that had been used to make the USS Eldridge invisible, and the reasons and possible military applications of the psychological effects of the magnetic field.

A report was supposedly prepared and presented to the United States Congress, and was soundly rejected as far too dangerous. So a proposal was made directly to the United States Department of Defense promising a powerful new weapon that could drive an enemy insane, inducing the symptoms of schizophrenia at the touch of a button. Without Congressional approval, the project would have to be top secret and secretly funded. The Department of Defense approved. Funding supposedly came from a cache of US$10 billion in Nazi gold recovered from a train found by U.S. soldiers in a train tunnel in France. The train was blown up and all the soldiers involved were killed. When those funds ran out, additional funding was secured from ITT and Krupp AG in Germany.

=== The experiment comes to Long Island ===
Work was begun at Brookhaven National Laboratory on Long Island, New York under the name Phoenix Project, but it was soon realized that the project required a large radar dish, and installing one at Brookhaven would compromise the security of the project. Luckily, the U.S. Air Force had a decommissioned base at Montauk, New York, not far from Brookhaven, which had a complete Semi Automatic Ground Environment (SAGE) radar installation. The site was large and remote (Montauk was not yet a tourist attraction) and water access would allow equipment to be moved in and out undetected.

Equipment was moved to Camp Hero at the Montauk base in the late 1960s, and installed in an underground bunker beneath the base. According to conspiracy theorists, to mask the nature of the project the site was closed in 1969 and donated as a wildlife refuge/park, with the provision that everything underground would remain the property of the Air Force (although, in reality, the base remained in operation until the 1980s).

=== Key parts of the original book ===
Experiments began in earnest in the early 1970s and during this time one, some or all of the following are claimed to have occurred at the site:

- The facility was expanded to as many as twelve levels and several hundred workers, without anyone in the town noticing the tons of building materials or hundreds of workers required. Some reports have the facility extending under the town of Montauk itself.
- Homeless people were abducted and subjected to huge amounts of electromagnetic radiation. Few survived.
- People had their psychic abilities enhanced to the point where they could materialize objects out of thin air. Stewart Swerdlow claims to have been involved in the Montauk Project, and as a result, he says, his "psionic" faculties were boosted, but at the cost of emotional instability, post-traumatic stress disorder, and other issues.
- Experiments were conducted in teleportation.
- A "porthole in time" was created which allowed researchers to travel anywhere in time or space. This was developed into a stable "Time Tunnel".
- Contact was made with alien extraterrestrials through the Time Tunnel and technology was exchanged with them which enhanced the project. This allowed broader access to "hyperspace".
- An alien monster traveled through the time tunnel, destroyed equipment, and devoured researchers. The tunnel was shut down and the creature destroyed.
- Mind control experiments were conducted and runaway boys were abducted and brought out to the base where they underwent excruciating periods of both physical and mental torture in order to break their minds, then their minds were re-programmed. Many were supposedly killed during the process and buried at the site.
- On or about August 12, 1983, the time travel project at Camp Hero interlocked in hyperspace with the original Rainbow Project in 1943. The USS Eldridge was drawn into hyperspace and trapped there. Two men, Al Bielek and Duncan Cameron, both claim to have leaped from the deck of the Eldridge while it was in hyperspace and ended up after a period of severe disorientation at Camp Hero in the year 1983. Here they claim to have met John von Neumann, a famous physicist and mathematician, even though he was known to have died in 1957. Von Neumann had supposedly worked on the original Philadelphia Experiment, but the U.S. Navy denies this.
- Staff from the Camp Hero site traveled to the USS Eldridge and shut down the generators, causing the ship to return to Philadelphia naval yard in 1943 and causing the time tunnel to collapse.
- Metahumans and experiments in special serums to create such individuals were tested there.
- After the experiments were completed or the destruction of the facility, depending on which book you read, the facility was closed for good, all the staff were brainwashed, shot, or sworn to absolute secrecy, and all records destroyed. According to some stories, research continues at the site to this day with enhanced security.

=== Experiments discussed in the other books of the series ===
- Filmmakers were brought to the facility to begin work on a project that would culminate with the Moon landing hoax.
- The military personnel in charge were in fact cultists who built a 50-foot (15 m) ziggurat or step pyramid out of titanium for some esoteric reason.
- Early work on inventing the Internet and its implementation were undertaken there.
- Nazi scientists from Operation Paperclip were involved in some of the experiments there.
- Experimental "flying saucer" aircraft prototypes were created there, and shipped to other secret bases for testing.
- Bioengineering projects undertaken there eventually created the Jersey Devil.
- Black helicopters were manufactured and flown there.
- Nikola Tesla, whose death was faked in a conspiracy, was the chief director of operations at the base.
- Mass psychological experiments were invented there, such as a project using enormous subliminal messages and the creation of a "Men in Black" corps to confuse and frighten the public.
- The AIDS virus was created there.

== Other books in the Montauk Project series ==
The following books have been published by Sky Books which lists its home at Westbury in Nassau County, New York on Long Island.

- Montauk Revisited: Adventures in Synchronicity by Preston B. Nichols and Peter Moon published in 1993 (ISBN 0-9631889-1-7)
- Pyramids of Montauk: Explorations in Consciousness by Preston B. Nichols and Peter Moon published in 1995 (ISBN 0-9631889-2-5)
- The Black Sun: Montauk's Nazi-Tibetan Connection by Preston B. Nichols and Peter Moon published in 1997 (ISBN 0-9631889-4-1)
- Montauk: The Alien Connection by Stewart Swerdlow with Peter Moon (editor) published in 1998 (ISBN 0-9631889-8-4)

== See also ==
- List of conspiracy theories
