= Giorgina Reid =

American textile designer, photographer, and inventor

- Born: Giorgina Anzulata; November 3, 1908; Trieste, Italy
- Died: June 16, 2001 (aged 92)

Giorgina Reid (née Anzulata; November 3, 1908 – June 16, 2001) was an American textile designer and professional photographer who was credited with pioneering the reed-trench terracing erosion control system used to preserve the Montauk Point Lighthouse.

== Early life ==
Reid was born in Trieste, Italy. While a teenager, she came to the United States with her mother. She attended the Leonardo da Vinci Art School at the age of 15, despite the school normally only admitting college-age students.

She was also a photographer and wrote a book titled The Delights of Photography. Reid taught basic photography at the School of Visual Arts.

== Montauk Point Lighthouse ==
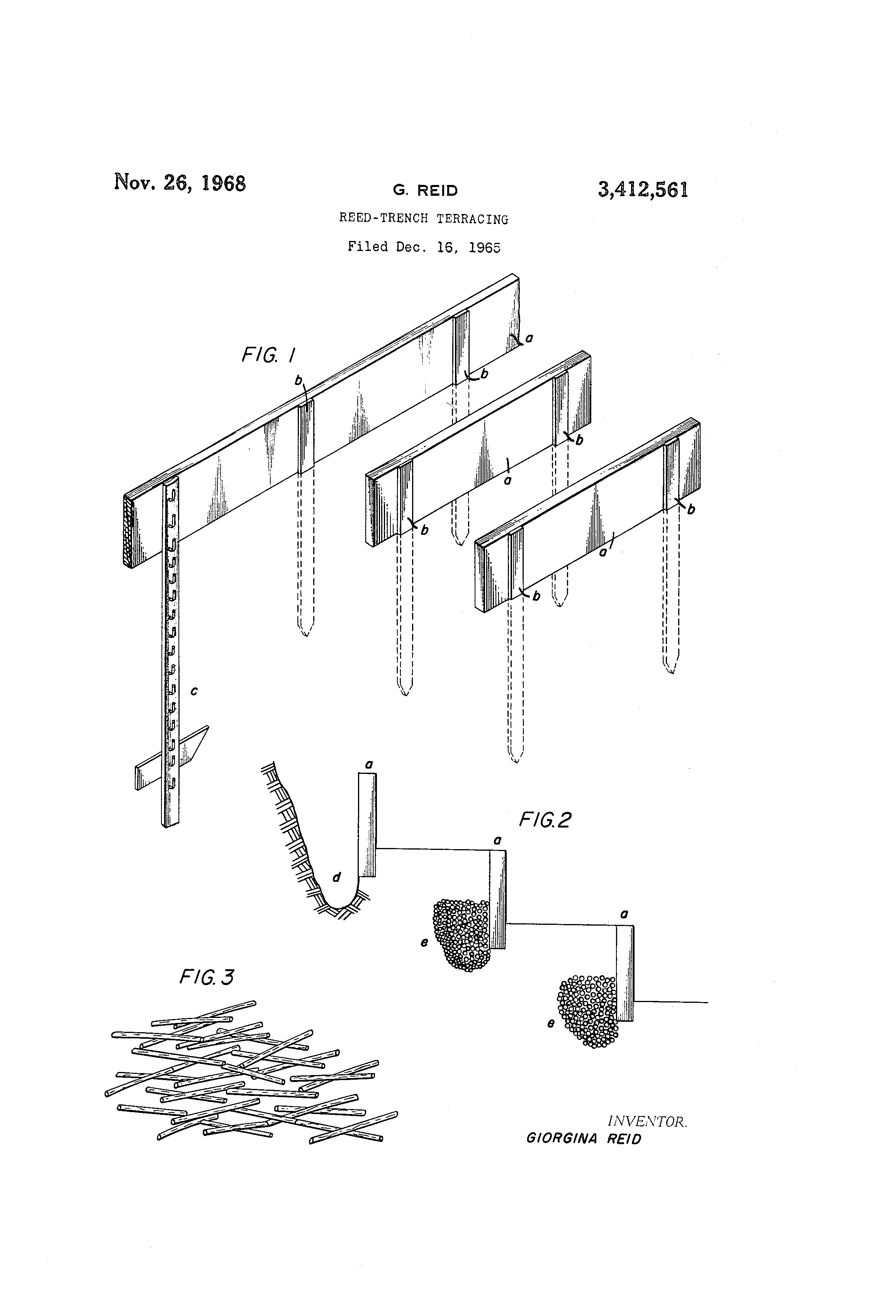
Diagram of reed-trench terracing from Reid's patent application.

Reid originally developed the reed-trench terracing technique to fortify her ocean cottage in Rocky Point following a 1962 nor'easter storm. The system protected her house the following year and then her neighbors' afterwards. Reid patented the system in 1965, and wrote a guide book on shoreline protection entitled How To Hold Up a Bank.

In 1969 Reid learned about the erosion at the Montauk Point Lighthouse and approached the Coast Guard about using reed-trench terracing. The Coast Guard allowed her to do a pilot, but wouldn't pay her. She began working on terracing the lighthouse with a group of seven volunteers on Earth Day, 1970. At the end of the summer, Coast Guard engineers unanimously voted to continue the project, impressed by the progress.

The Coast Guard did help her though: in 1972, engineers installed a gabion wall to protect the terracing above it, and she complimented the cooperation she was getting from them.

By 1983, she had spent around $35,000 to $40,000 of her own money to fund the project, receiving no local nor federal funds.

She was able to stabilize the eastern bluff of Turtle Hill by 1985. For the southwest bluff, Reid "sculpted the bluff face by hand," using a modification of her technique adapted for the steep slope.

Reid was honored at the lighthouse on September 12, 1986, and received a commendation from President Ronald Reagan, who wrote: "There is no doubt that your ingenious trench terracing work saved the Montauk Lighthouse."

She retired in 1987, seventeen years after starting the project. That year, the Montauk Historical Society established a museum at the lighthouse and in 1996, dedicated one of the rooms to her and her husband.

On June 1, 1996, during the bicentennial celebration of the lighthouse, Reid was honored for her work: "Twenty-six years ago she said it could be done. It's done."

== Personal life ==
She was married to Donald Reid, who was also in the textile design business. The two had no children; instead she described the lighthouse project as her child.

Reid died at the age of 92 and is buried next to her husband in Calverton National Cemetery.
