= AN/FPS-24 radar =

AN/FPS-24
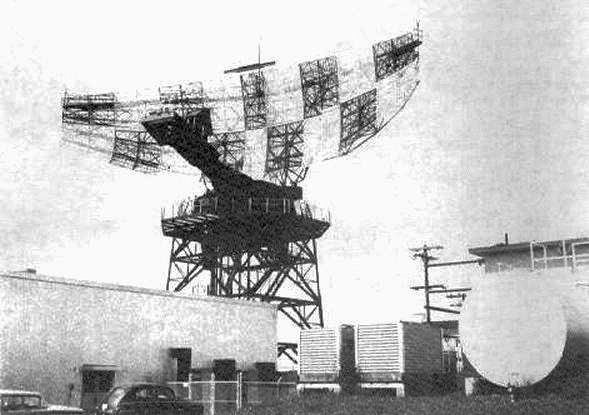
- General Electric AN/FPS-24 Radar
- Country of origin: United States
- No. built: 12
- Type: early warning radar
- Frequency: VHF
- PRF: 278 Hz
- Pulsewidth: 20 µs
- RPM: 5
- Range: 250 nautical miles (460 km)
- Diameter: 120 by 50 feet (37 by 15 m)
- Precision: 200 m in range
- Power: 5 MW

The AN/FPS-24 Radar was a long range early warning radar used by the United States Air Force Air Defense Command. It used a two-frequency signal in order to avoid fluctuation loss, which causes signals on single-frequency radars to fade in and out as the target moves. Reducing this effect results in a much steadier signal.

General Electric was the primary contractor for the design, which operated in the very high frequency (VHF) at 214 to 236 MHz.

In accordance with the Joint Electronics Type Designation System (JETDS), the "AN/FPS-24" designation represents the 24th design of an Army-Navy electronic device for fixed ground search radar. The JETDS system also now is used to name all Department of Defense electronic systems.

== Construction ==
Twelve systems were built between 1958 and 1962 at various locations around the United States. Problems with the design were revealed during initial testing Eufaula AFS (Eufaula, Alabama) in 1960, resulting in modifications. Additional problems occurred in 1961 when deployment of the first production model at Point Arena Air Force Station in California. revealed bearing problems due to the 85.5 short tons (77.6 t) antenna weight. Failures of the 9 feet (2.7 m) hydrostatic bearing often caused the early closure of some radar sites due to catastrophic damage to the support tower, sail, and feed horn.

Depending on the location of the installation, the radar reflector itself was perched atop one of two different towers: a cast-in-place concrete tower or a metal-sided steel-framed tower both with equal dimensions of 84.5 feet (25.8 m) in height and side dimensions of 60.25 feet (18.36 m) square (63.25 inches (1,607 mm) square including the thickness of corner buttresses). This tower design was also used for the AN/FPS-35 frequency diverse SAGE (Semi-Automatic Ground Environment) search radar built by Sperry Corporation. The prototype installation at Eufaula, Alabama, was perched atop a steel lattice structure tower of shorter, unconfirmed height. Acme Missiles & Construction Corp., Rockville Centre, N.Y. built the radar tower facilities at Missile Master, Pittsburgh Defense Area, Oakdale, PA. Two of the AN/FPS-24 radar installations were covered by a fiberglass dome, protecting the components from the elements. One such installation was at Cottonwood Air Force Station, Idaho. The other was at Mt Hebo Air Force Station, Oregon.

The AN/FPS-24 radar antenna reflector rotated 5 revolutions per minute (a SAGE specification) and was often the cause of interference reported by nearby residents who could hear the radar signal in television and radio broadcasts. At some locations, the radar signal was "blanked" as it passed over television broadcast antenna sites such as Mt. Loma Prieta in the Santa Cruz Mountains, California. However, at DEFCON 3 or higher, the signal was ordered "unblanked" in all directions.

The 7.5 megawatt (maximum power) transmitter ran in normal operation at 5 MW output pulse (nearly 20 microseconds in duration) and was conveyed from the transmitter to the antenna feed horn via a 9 inches (230 mm) diameter rigid coaxial connector. The feed horn consisted of a cross dipole antenna design for both A and B channels.

== Post-operation ==
Subsequent to USAF site closures, some AN/FPS-24 radar units were upgraded to Air Route Surveillance Radar (ARSR) units for USAF-FAA joint surveillance duty.

== Historical Designation ==
On May 10, 2016, the Santa Clara County Board of Supervisors voted unanimously to list the Almaden Air Force Station AN/FPS-24 concrete Radar Tower on the County Heritage Resource Inventory, thus giving it official historic status and demolition protection.

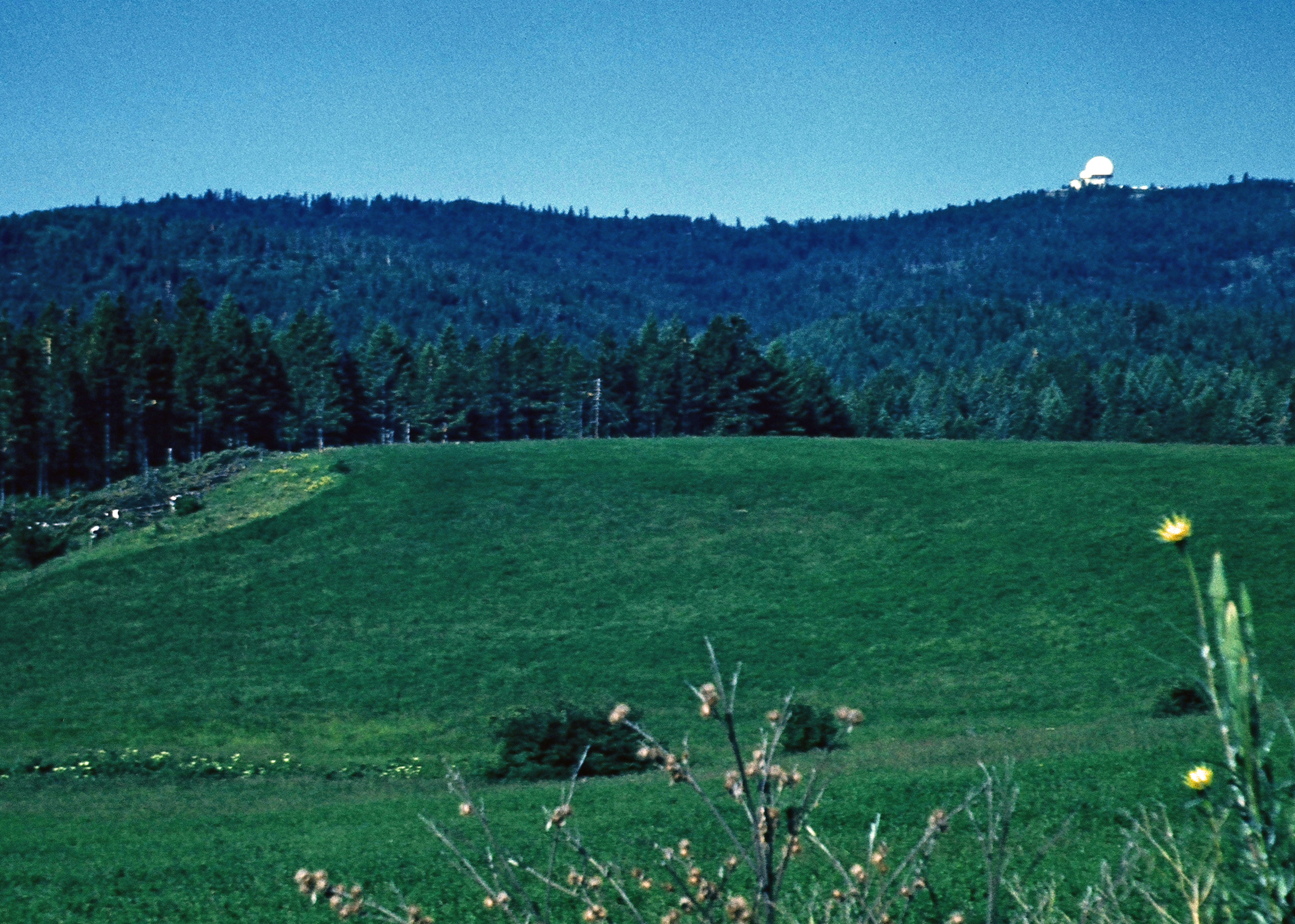
FPS-24 radome dwarfing FPS-6A radome alongside, Cottonwood AFS, Cottonwood, Idaho circa 1964.

The 84.5 foot (25.8 m) concrete buildings that supported most of the AN/FPS-24 antennas were prominent landmarks, and all remain standing.

- AL Eufaula 31.8814°N 85.2536°W (prototype, steel lattice tower, demolished)
- CA Point Arena 38.8886°N 123.5497°W (first production unit, concrete, present)
- CA Almaden 37.1605°N 121.8976°W (second production unit, used for benchmarking all subsequent AN/FPS-24 units, concrete tower, designated historic)
- ID Cottonwood 46.0667°N 116.4643°W (steel tower, present)
- MI Port Austin 44.0303°N 83.0025°W (concrete tower, present)
- MN Baudette 48.6707°N 94.6201°W (concrete tower, present)
- MT Malmstrom 47.5018°N 111.2034°W (steel tower, demolished)
- NC Winston-Salem 36.0435°N 80.1366°W (concrete tower, present)
- PA Oakdale 40.3991°N 80.1566°W (concrete tower, present)
- WA Blaine 48.9119°N 122.7346°W (concrete tower, present)
- OR Mt. Hebo 45.2158°N 123.7578°W (steel tower, demolished)
- ME Bucks Harbor 44.6294°N 67.3953°W (steel tower, demolished)

== See also ==
- List of radars
- List of military electronics of the United States
