= Montauk Air Force Station =

Former US military installation on Long Island, New York

Montauk Air Force Station
- Part of Air Defense Command (ADC)

Location
- Location of Montauk AFS, New York
- Coordinates: 41°04′03″N 071°54′20″W

Site history
- Built: 1942
- In use: 1942–1981

Montauk Air Force Station was a US military base at Montauk Point on the eastern tip of Long Island, New York. It was decommissioned in 1981 and is now owned by the New York State Office of Parks, Recreation and Historic Preservation as Camp Hero State Park.

== History ==
The eastern tip of Long Island has always had strategic significance, even in the days of the American Revolution. When the Montauk Lighthouse was first authorized in 1792, part of its mission was to keep a lookout for British ships sailing for New York or Boston, and as such was the first military installation at Montauk.

Montauk was always considered a prime location for a possible invasion because of its remoteness and prime location midway between two major American cities. During World War I, the Navy established Naval Air Station Montauk in August 1917, commanded by LT Marc Mitscher. Reconnaissance dirigibles, an airplane, troops and Coast Guard personnel were stationed at Montauk.

=== World War II ===
Fort Hero was established in 1942 on the point just south of the Montauk lighthouse. The fort was named after Major General Andrew Hero, Jr., who was the Army's Chief of Coast Artillery between 1926 and 1930. He died in 1942.

In World War II, with German U-boats threatening the East Coast and Long Island, Montauk was again considered a likely invasion point. The US Army upgraded Fort Hero, and renamed it Camp Hero in 1942. The Navy also acquired land in the area, including Fort Pond Bay and Montauk Manor. They built docks, seaplane hangars, barracks, and other buildings in the area. There was also a huge torpedo testing facility.

The whole facility, with Army, Navy and Coast Guard constituents, was officially known as the "US Military Reservation" but the locals just called it "Camp Hero".

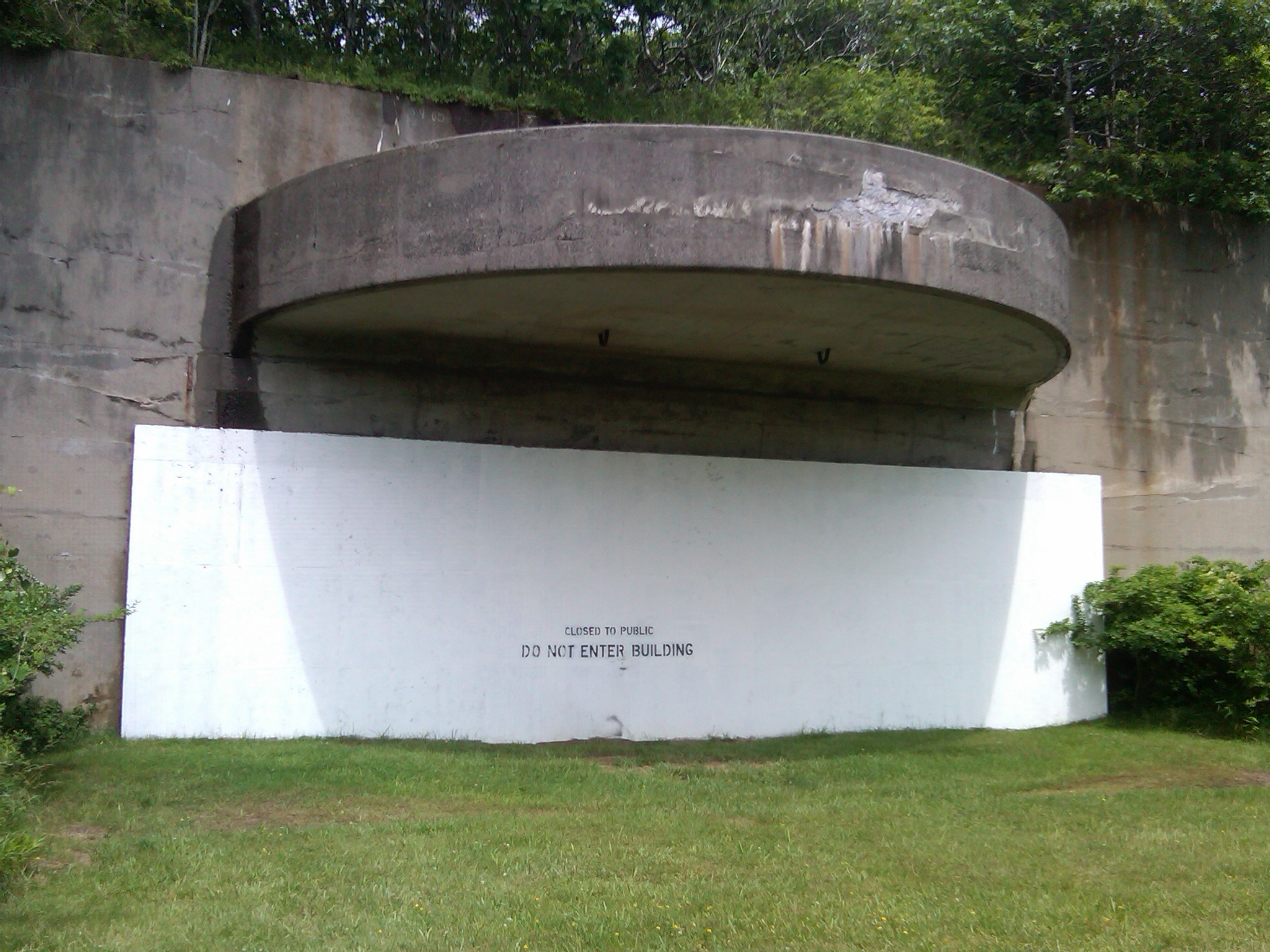
One of the 16-inch gun casemates at Camp Hero.

Camp Hero itself grew to 278 acres (1.13 km^{2}), and included four surplus 16-inch naval rifles, originally intended for battleships, installed as coastal artillery pieces in two concrete bunkers. These batteries rendered obsolete almost all previous heavy guns in the Harbor Defenses of Long Island Sound. They were designated with battery construction numbers 112 and 113, Battery 113 was also known as Battery Dunn. A two-gun 6-inch battery, Battery 216, was also built. The coastal gun emplacements were camouflaged with netting and foliage. A large "Fire Control Center" was built next to the lighthouse to direct the artillery and anti-aircraft guns. Other armaments included quadruple .50 caliber machine guns for low altitude defense, and 90 mm and 120 mm anti-aircraft guns. The camp was a self-contained town with recreational facilities, barracks and its own power station.

Camp Hero was also used as a training facility and a target range, with guns being fired at offshore targets.

To protect it from enemy bombers and German spies in fishing boats, the entire base was built to look like a typical New England fishing village. Concrete bunkers had windows painted on them and ornamental roofs with fake dormers. The gymnasium was made to look like a church with a faux steeple.

When World War II ended, the base was temporarily shut down and used as a training facility by the Army Reserve. The naval facilities were largely abandoned and the gun emplacements were dismantled in 1949.

=== Cold War ===
After the 1948 Berlin Blockade in Germany, the Cold War began in earnest. This event, coupled with the advent of the Soviet Tupolev Tu-4 intercontinental bomber in 1947, created serious concern about the possibility of a Soviet air attack on the continental United States. This spurred the United States Air Force (USAF) to direct its Air Defense Command (ADC) to take radar sets out of storage for operation in the Northeastern United States in 1948. By August of that year, a radar station had been placed at Lashup Site L-10 at Montauk, NY. This program was appropriately named "Lashup".

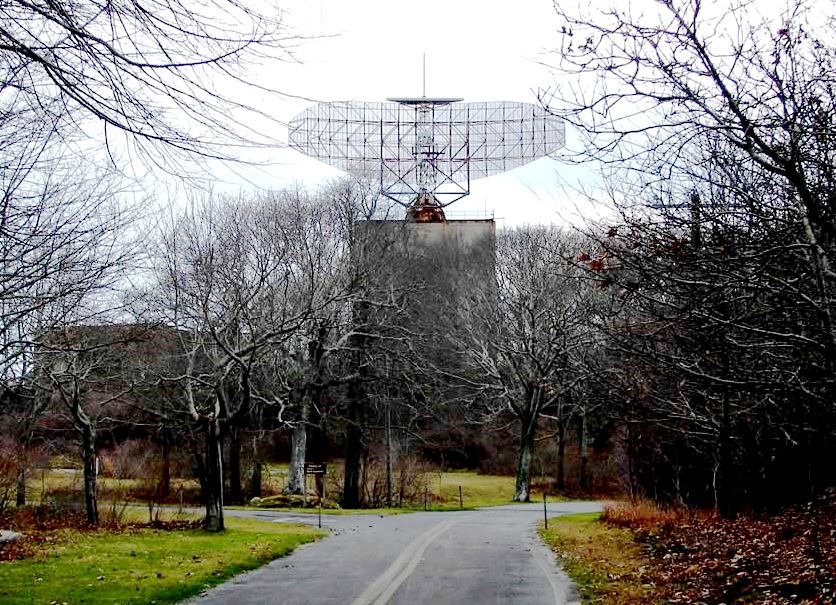
This AN/FPS-35 Radar at Camp Hero State Park in Montauk, New York. The radar (the only one of its kind still in existence) was not torn down because boaters on nearby waters preferred the massive radar as a landmark rather than the nearby Montauk Point Light.

As part of this temporary network, ADC placed an AN/TPS-1B long-range search radar at Fort Hero in June 1948 and designated the site as Montauk Point, L-10. The Montauk site fed into a primitive control center established at Roslyn AFS, New York. In 1950 it activated the 773d Aircraft Control and Warning Squadron (AC&W Sq) to operate the facility. On 1 December 1953, the site designation was changed to LP-45 and the Air Force facilities were renamed Montauk Air Force Station. Montauk AFS was incorporated into the permanent ADC network of General Surveillance Radar Stations.

With the establishment of a permanent presence, ADC equipped the site with AN/CPS-5 and AN/TPS-10A height-finder radars. A year later AN/FPS-3 and AN/FPS-5 radars were operating. Between 1955 and 1956 an AN/FPS-8/GPS-3 made an appearance at the tip of the site. In the spring of 1957 Montauk AFS received one of the first AN/FPS-20 units along with a pair of AN/FPS-6 height-finder radars.

In November 1957, the Army closed the Camp Hero portion of the military reservation as Soviet long-distance bombers could fly well above ground-based artillery. The Air Force continued using the western half of the facility for radar surveillance. The Eastern portion of the site was donated to New York State, but it remained unused because of its close proximity to a high-security facility.

During 1958, Montauk AFS joined the Semi Automatic Ground Environment (SAGE) system, feeding data to DC-01 at McGuire AFB, New Jersey. After joining, the squadron was redesignated as the 773d Radar Squadron (SAGE) on 1 October 1958. It was also a major part of the NORAD defense system, so security was very tight. Montauk AFS was state of the art and many new systems were developed or tested there including magnetic memory for storage, light pens, keyboards, WANs (Wide area networks) and modular circuit packaging.

Montauk was the operational parent station for Texas Tower 3 (TT-3) offshore in the Atlantic Ocean from June 1958-25 March 1963. TT-3 was operated as an annex of the 773d AC&W Sq, with its offshore personnel assigned to a flight of the 773d, although the facility was logistically supported by the 4604th Support Squadron (Texas Towers) at Otis AFB.

In December 1960, the large, high-power AN/FPS-35 radar became operational at Montauk. The reflector was 126 feet (38 m) long and 38 feet (12 m) tall, weighing 40 tons, and was supposedly only the second ever built. It was able to detect airborne objects at distances of well over 200 miles (320 km). It also used "frequency diversity" technology making it resistant to electronic countermeasures. The AN/FPS-35 was so powerful that it disrupted local TV and radio broadcasts, and had to be shut down several times and re-calibrated. The problems caused this radar to be taken out of service temporarily in 1961. With the problems resolved, the radar was operational again in 1962 and by 1963 an AN/FPS-26 had replaced one of the AN/FPS-6 height-finder radars.

In 1963, the site also had become an FAA/ADC joint-use facility. Around 1965, the site was removed from joint-use status. On 31 July 1963, the site was redesignated as NORAD ID Z-45. In 1978, the Air Force submitted a proposal to the Carter Administration to close the base, as it was largely obsolete due to the emergence of orbital satellite reconnaissance technology. In September 1979, as part of a general draw down of anti-aircraft forces by Aerospace Defense Command, Montauk AFS was transferred to Tactical Air Command and became part of ADTAC.

In addition to the main facility, Montauk AFS operated two unmanned AN/FPS-14 Gap Filler sites:

- Manorville, NY (P-45A) 40°51′05″N 072°46′02″W
- Chilmark, MA (P-45B) 41°21′19″N 070°44′07″W

Both sites opened in 1957. They were closed in June 1968. The Manorville site remains, although abandoned with vegetation growing over the facility. The Chilmark site is now obliterated.

The installation, which had also supplied long-range radar data for the Federal Aviation Administration (FAA) since 1962, was kept operational until a new facility operated by the (FAA) in Riverhead, New York was ready for use.

The Montauk installation was shut down on 31 January 1981. Considering its size, removing the huge antenna was problematic at best so it was "abandoned in place", with its controlling motors and electronics removed, allowing it to move with the wind to prevent it being torn off its base in a storm. A GATR (Ground Air Transmitter Receiver) facility remained in service to direct military aircraft operating within the region. This system was deactivated and removed in 1984. Riverhead now controls all air traffic in the area.

=== Air Force units and assignments ===
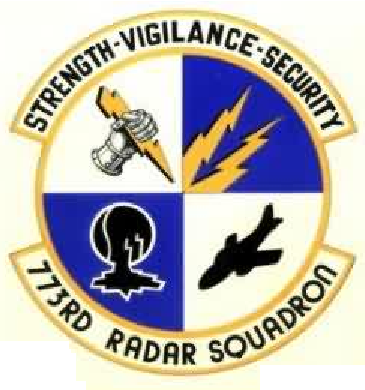
773d Radar Squadron emblem (Note: Approved 5 May 1969)

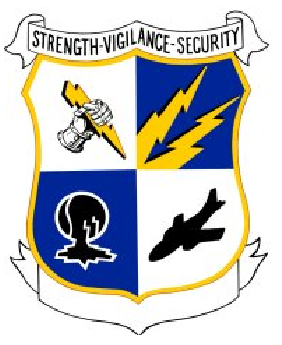
773d Aircraft Control & Warning Squadron emblem

==== Units ====
- Constituted as the 773d Aircraft Control and Warning Squadron on 14 November 1950

Activated on 27 November 1950
Redesignated 773d Radar Squadron (SAGE) on 1 October 1958
Redesignated 773d Radar Squadron on 1 February 1974
Inactivated on 31 March 1981.

==== Assignments ====
- 503d Aircraft Control and Warning Group, 1 June 1948
- 26th Air Division, 6 February 1952
- 4709th Defense Wing (later 4709th Air Defense Wing), 16 February 1953
- 4707th Air Defense Wing, 1 March 1956
- 4709th Air Defense Wing, 8 July 1956
- 4621st Air Defense Wing (later New York Air Defense Sector), 18 October 1956
- 21st Air Division, 1 April 1966
- 35th Air Division, 1 December 1967
- 21st Air Division, 19 November 1969 – 31 March 1981

Source after 1951

== See also ==
- Montauk Point land claim – Three 1879 lawsuits in New York, US
- Montauk Project – UFO conspiracy theory
- Seacoast defense in the United States – Coastal forts construction and maintenance in the U.S.
- United States Army Coast Artillery Corps – Former administrative corps and coastal artillery branch of the U.S. Army
- List of conspiracy theories
- List of USAF Aerospace Defense Command General Surveillance Radar Stations
- List of United States Air Force aircraft control and warning squadrons
