= Montauk Point Light =

Lighthouse in New York, United States

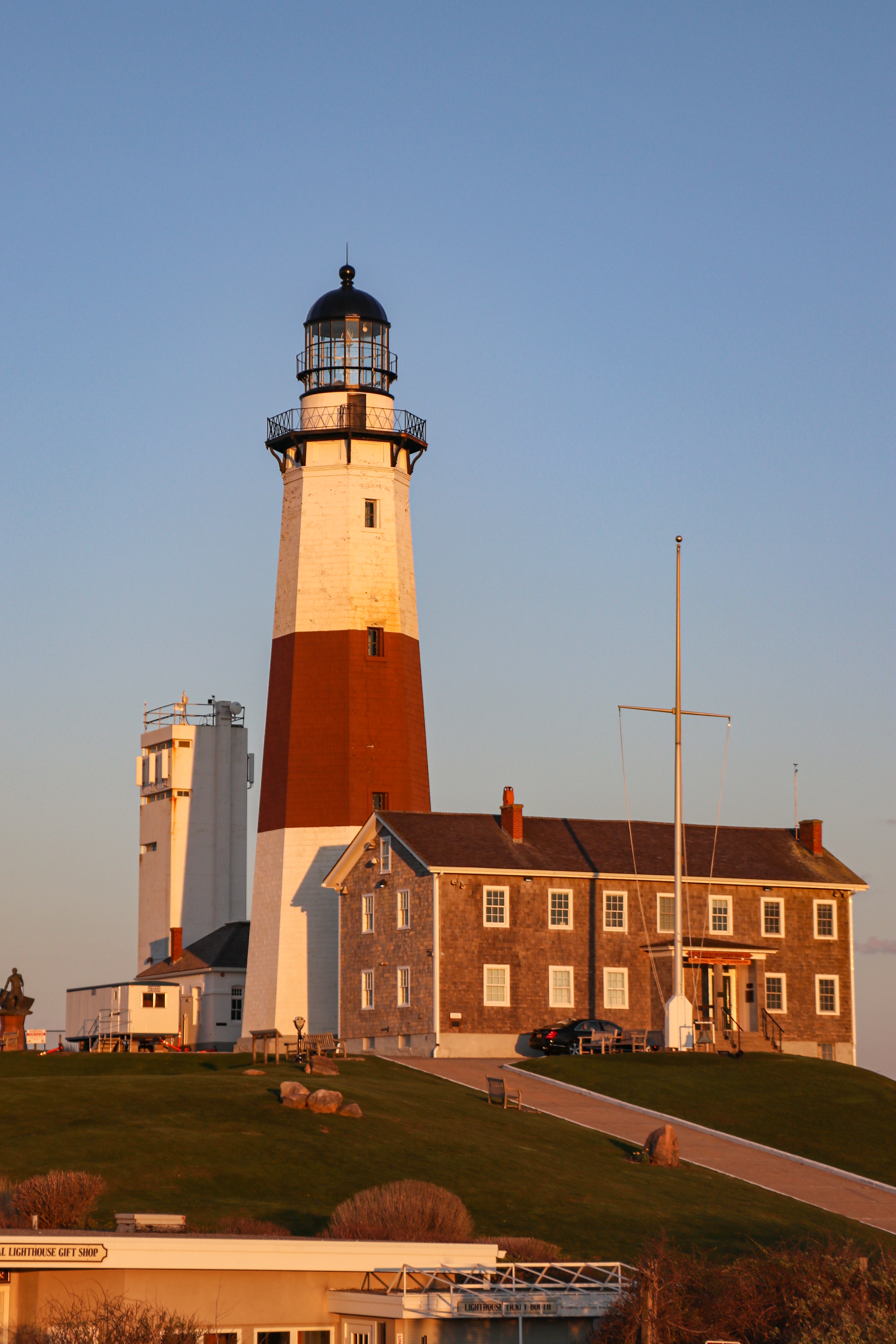
- Montauk Point Light in April 2020
- Location: Montauk Point, Suffolk County, New York, U.S.
- Coordinates: 41°04′16″N 71°51′26″W

Tower
- Foundation: 13 ft (4 m) deep and 9 ft (3 m) thick, Natural, Emplaced, built in 1796
- Construction: Sandstone
- Automated: 1987
- Height: 110.5 ft (33.7 m) structure
- Shape: Octagonal pyramidal
- Markings: Tower painted white with a broad red band midway, lantern black
- Heritage: National Historic Landmark, National Register of Historic Places listed place, New York State Register of Historic Places listed place
- Fog signal: Horn: 1 2s in every 15s

Light
- First lit: 1797
- Focal height: 168 ft (51 m)
- Lens: 8 whale oil lamps (1797), Fresnel lens (later) 1903-1987, VRB-25 1987-2023, as of 11/06/2023 the same (reconditioned) 3 1/2 order bivalve Fresnel lens that was removed in 1987. (current)
- Range: 18 nm
- Characteristic: Flashing White 5 seconds.
- Montauk Point Lighthouse
- U.S. National Register of Historic Places
- U.S. National Historic Landmark
- New York State Register of Historic Places
- Nearest city: East Hampton, New York, U.S.
- Area: less than one acre
- Built: 1796
- Architect: John McComb Jr.
- NRHP reference No.: 69000142
- NYSRHP No.: 10303.000001

Significant dates
- Added to NRHP: July 07, 1969
- Designated NHL: March 2, 2012
- Designated NYSRHP: June 23, 1980

The Montauk Point Light, or Montauk Point Lighthouse, is a lighthouse located adjacent to Montauk Point State Park at the easternmost point of Long Island in Montauk, New York. The lighthouse was the first to be built within the state of New York. It is the fourth oldest active lighthouse in the United States. Montauk Point Light is listed on the National Register of Historic Places. In 2012, it was designated as a National Historic Landmark for its significance to New York and international shipping in the early Federal period.

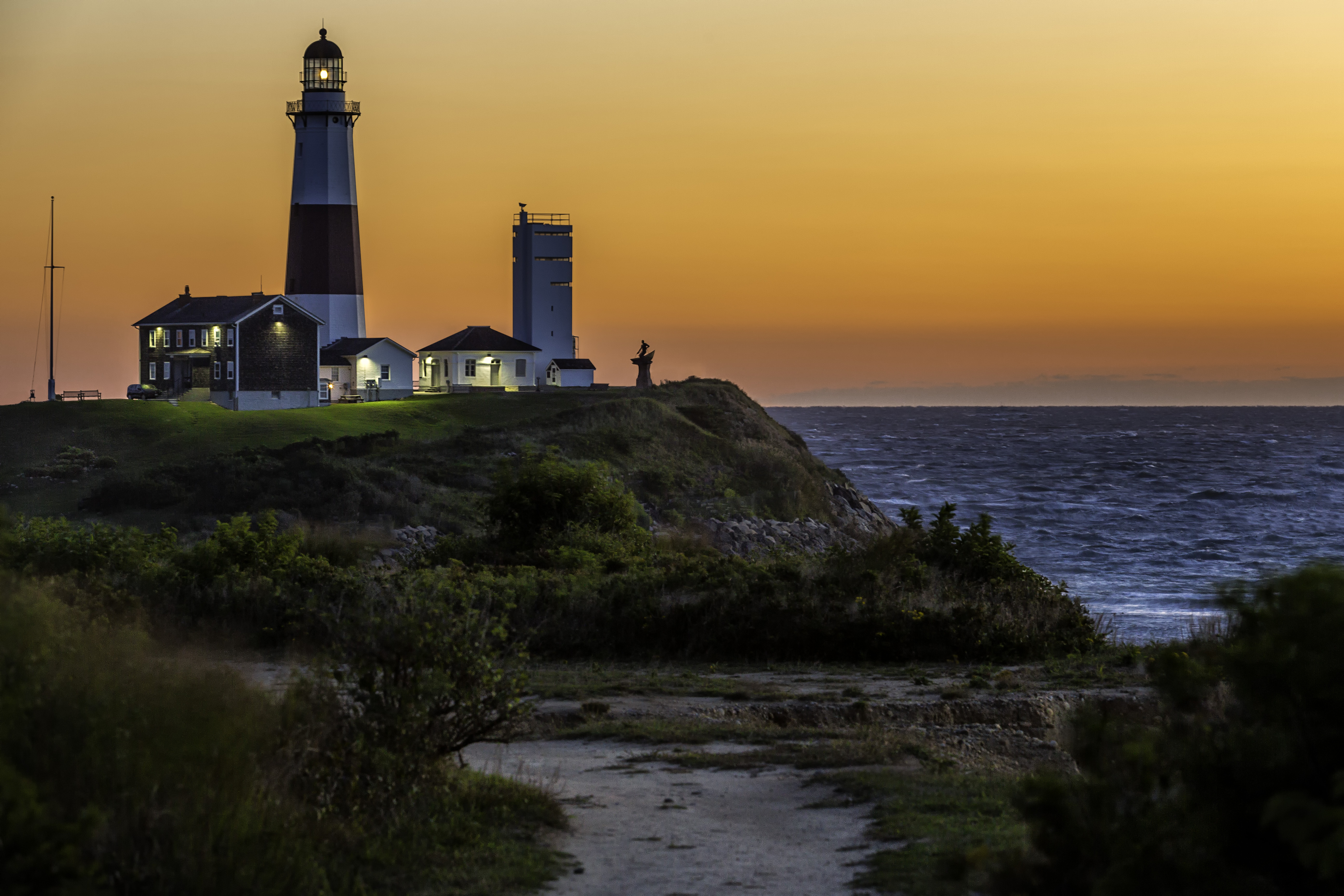
The Montauk Point Lighthouse at dawn

The lighthouse, which is located on Turtle Hill at the easternmost tip of Long Island, at 2000 Montauk Highway, is a privately run museum, and is not part of Montauk Point State Park.

== History ==
A stylized image of the Montauk Point Light graces the shields of each of Long Island's state parkways

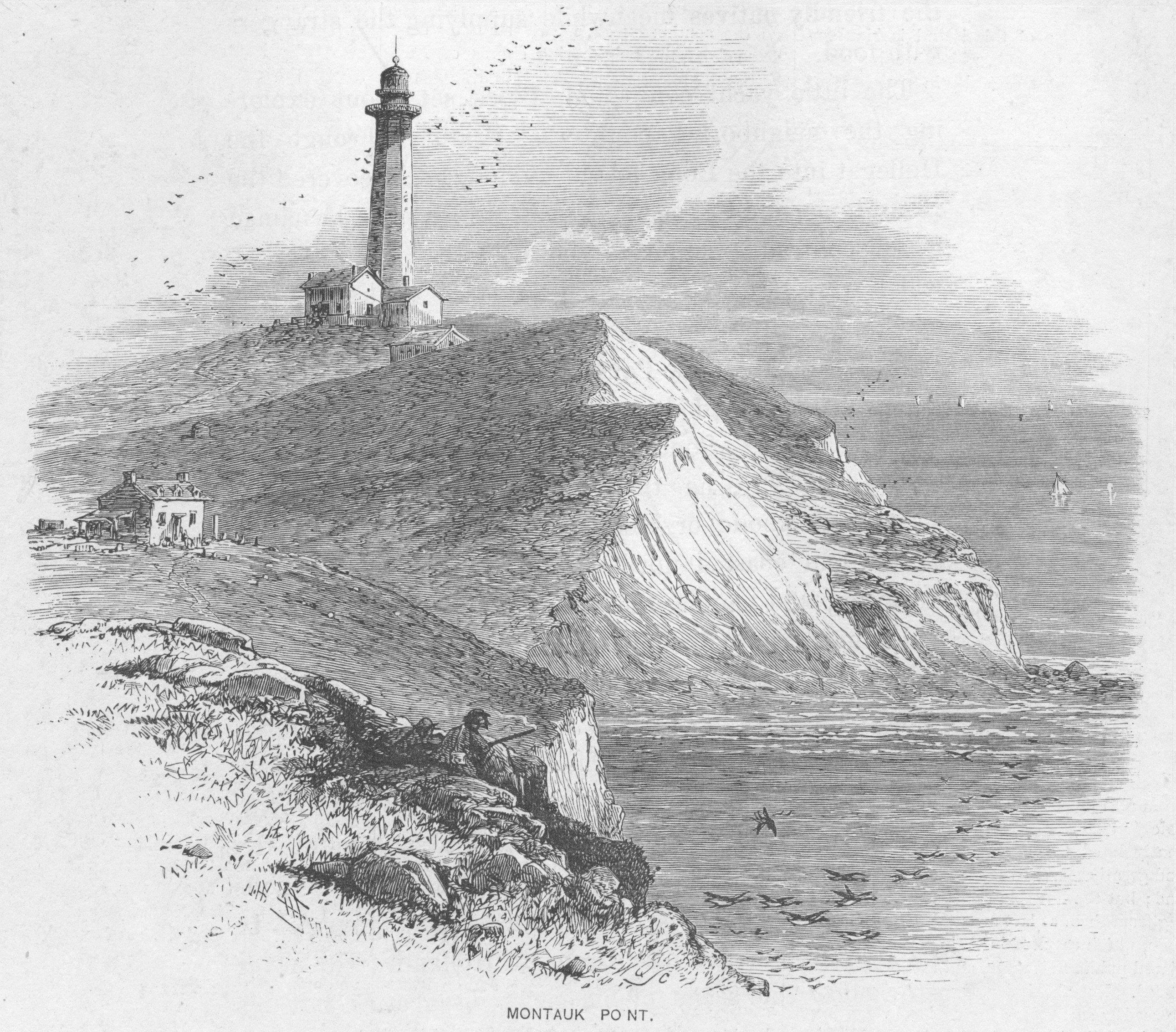
Montauk Point on display at the New York Public Library

Montauk Light was the first lighthouse in New York State, and is the fourth-oldest active lighthouse in the United States. The tower is 110 feet 6 inches (33.68 metres) high. The current light is a 3 1/2 order bivalve (clamshell) Fresnel lens.

On April 12, 1792, construction on the lighthouse was authorized by the 2nd United States Congress under President George Washington. Ezra L'Hommedieu, a lawyer, member of the Continental Congress in Philadelphia, and a man with scientific interests, consulted with Washington on its construction. He represented the New York City Chamber of Commerce on discussions related to the lighthouse. He made the case that New York City "was first among American ports in the volume of its foreign commerce. By 1797, the harbor was handling a third of the nation's trade with other countries." Due to prevailing winds in winter, shippers approaching from sea needed a lighthouse at the end of Long Island to guide them along the south side into New York harbor.

L'Hommedieu chose the site for the lighthouse and designed it. The project began on June 7, 1796, and was completed on November 5, 1796, the first public works project of the new United States of America. Sometime in early April 1797, keeper Jacob Hand lit the wicks in the lamps in the tower, and the lighthouse began operation. It continued under civilian keepers until World War II, when the US Army took it over.

In 1860, the lighthouse station underwent a massive renovation when two new levels and a larger lantern were added. This increased the height of the tower from its original 80 feet (1796) to its current height of 110 feet 6 inches (33.68 metres). A first-order Fresnel lens—12 feet high, 6 feet (3.7 x 1.8 m) in diameter, and weighing about 10,000 pounds—was installed in the new lantern; the current keeper's dwelling was constructed adjacent to the tower, and the original 1796 dwelling was demolished. A steam-powered fog signal was installed in 1873, with a fog signal building in 1897. The tower was originally all white; its single brown stripe was added in 1899. A fourth-order fixed red range-light was added to the watch deck of the tower in 1903 to warn of Shagwong Reef, a navigational hazard about 3 1/2 miles northwest of the lighthouse. This light was severely damaged in the hurricane of September 21, 1938, and removed on July 1, 1940, when the lighthouse was electrified. The huge first-order Fresnel lens was replaced in 1903 with a 3 1/2 order bivalve Fresnel lens, which served until February 3, 1987, when it was replaced with an airport beacon with a strength of 2.5 million candela. However, as of November 6, 2023, the 3 1/2 order bivalve Fresnel lens that was replaced in 1987 has been restored and is now back atop the lighthouse.

During World War II, the lighthouse was taken over by the U.S. Army as part of the Eastern Coastal Defense Shield. The last three civilian keepers, Thomas Buckridge, Jack Miller, and George Warrington, departed in the spring of 1943. Adjacent to the lighthouse, Camp Hero, opened by the Army in 1942, had two 16 inch gun batteries of two guns each, and a battery of two six-inch guns. The casemates, gun emplacements and concrete fire control towers (which are also at nearby Shadmoor State Park) are still visible.

In 1946, the United States Coast Guard took over maintenance of the lighthouse and operated it until the station was automated on February 3, 1987. In May of that year, the lighthouse museum opened to the public, operated by the Montauk Historical Society. It leased the property from the US Coast Guard for that purpose. On September 30, 1996, President Bill Clinton signed legislation transferring the lighthouse property to the Montauk Historical Society.

The tower was built on Turtle Hill 300 feet (90 m) from the edge of the cliff; due to the cumulative effects of shoreline erosion, it is now 100 feet (30 m) away from the edge. After World War II, the United States Army Corps of Engineers built a seawall at its base, but the erosion continued. The Coast Guard considered tearing down the lighthouse in 1967 and replacing it with a steel tower farther from the edge of the bluff. In the wake of protests over the announced dismantling of the tower, Congressman Michael Forbes proposed a bill to the United States Congress to hand over the Lighthouse to the Montauk Historical Society from the public so it could be preserved; the bill was passed.

Giorgina Reid, a textile designer, had saved her Rocky Point, New York cottage from collapse by building a simple set of terraces in the gullies of the bluff. She proposed that solution to the Society at Montauk. Reid's concept, Reed-Trench Terracing, called for building the terrace platforms made of various beach debris, notably reeds; the practice (along with further strengthening of the rocks at the bluff toe) appeared to stem the erosion. She patented the process and published an article about it titled "How to Hold up a Bank". Greg Donohue, a Montauk landscaper, worked with Reid at the Point and kept the project moving forward after she retired in 1986. With support from various sources, including the Montauk Historical Society and the State of New York, the Erosion Control Project of Montauk Point was successfully completed in 1998.

However, the recurrence of the erosion threat in ensuing years has prompted further action: In November 2006, the United States Army Corps of Engineers' plan to build another seawall was opposed by a local surfing group, who contended that a seawall would ruin the nearby world-renowned surf break. They proposed moving the lighthouse back from the shore, as was done with the Cape Hatteras Lighthouse. Complicating such a move is the terrain, which would require the lighthouse to be moved down one hill and up another. Environmental groups have raised concerns that reducing the erosion at Montauk would increase erosion at other Long Island beaches, as there are always related effects to such infrastructure work.

On March 2, 2012, United States Secretary of the Interior Ken Salazar officially designated the lighthouse as a National Historic Landmark; it is the 14th site on Long Island and the 11th lighthouse in the country to be so recognized.

Pirate Captain Kidd was said to have buried treasure at the foot of the lighthouse site around 1699 at two ponds which today are called "Money Ponds."

== Recent Renovations ==
The United States Army Corps of Engineers announced on January 13, 2020, the award of a $30.7 million contract to H&L Contracting of Bayshore, New York to restore and protect the lighthouse from shoreline erosion. Work began in 2021 and ended in August 2023. The approximately 1,000 linear feet stone revetment work consisted of removing and reusing existing five- and 10-ton armor stones, placement of new 10- and 15-ton armor stones, and providing slope stabilization with terracing and vegetation above the upper crest of the revetment. The project also included a complete repainting of the lighthouse. The total project cost $44 million.

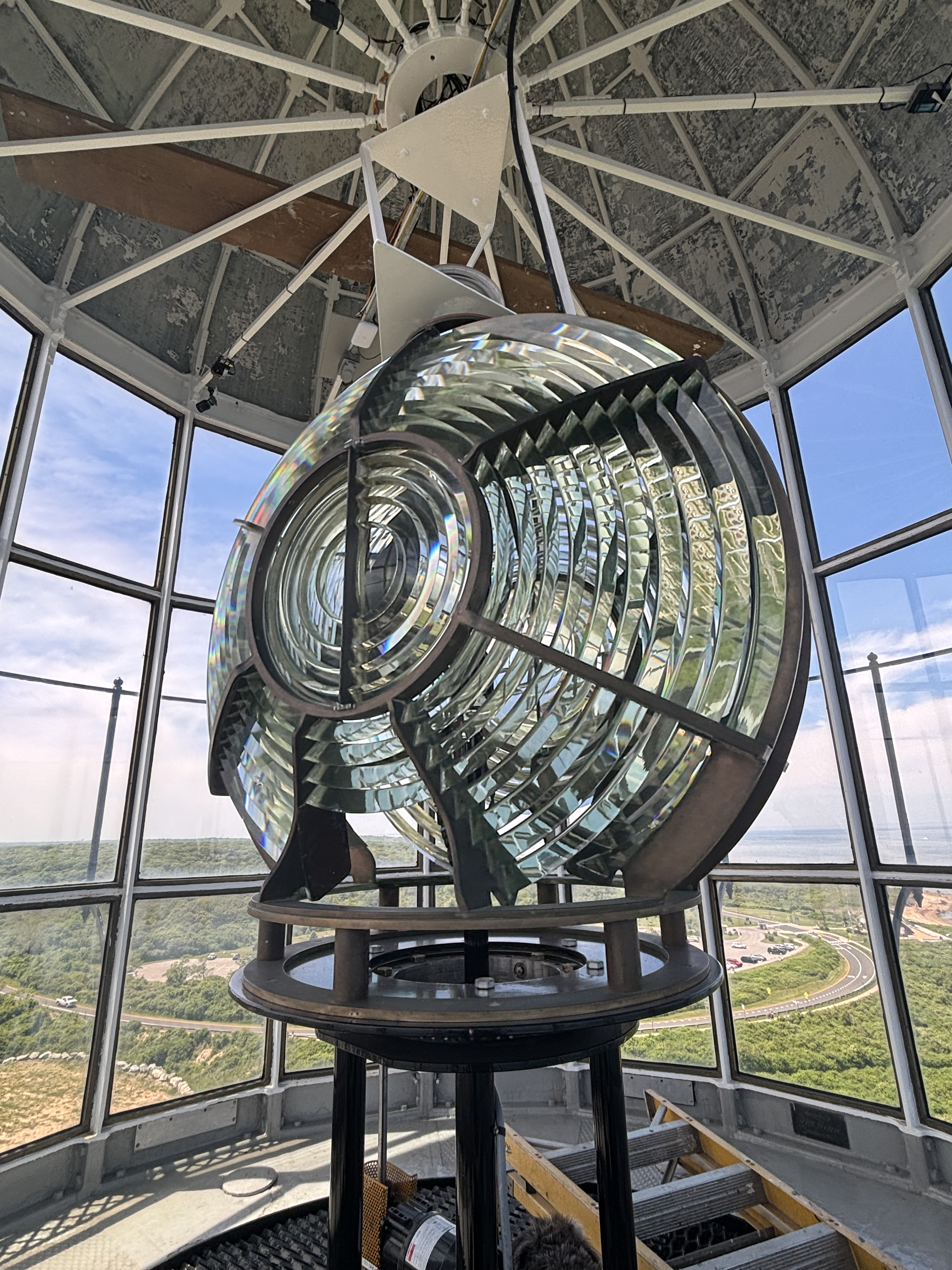
The restored bivalve 3 1/2-order Fresnel Lens, made in France by Barbier, Benard, et Turenne.

== Gallery ==
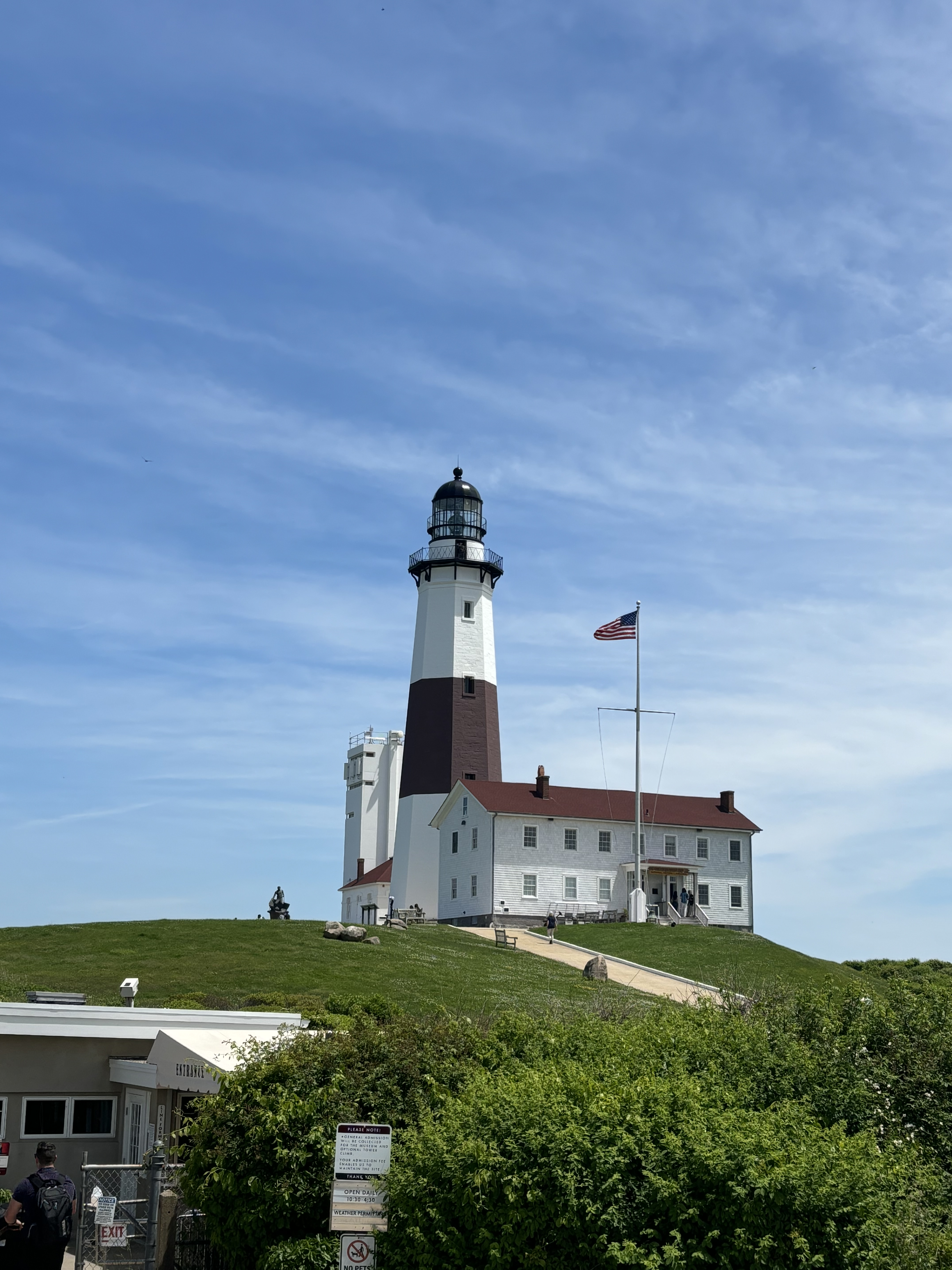
The Lighthouse in June 2024

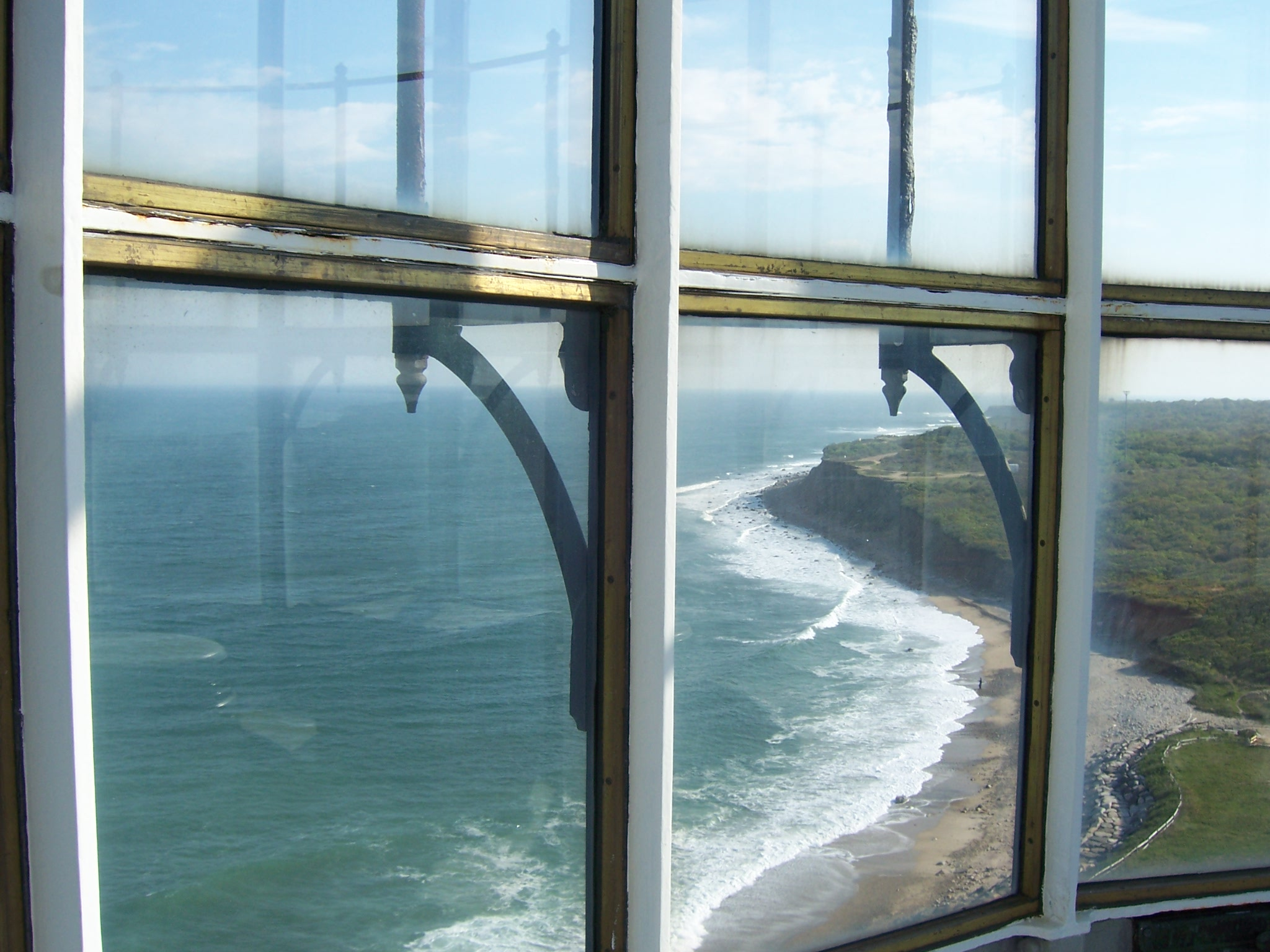
View from the top of the lighthouse

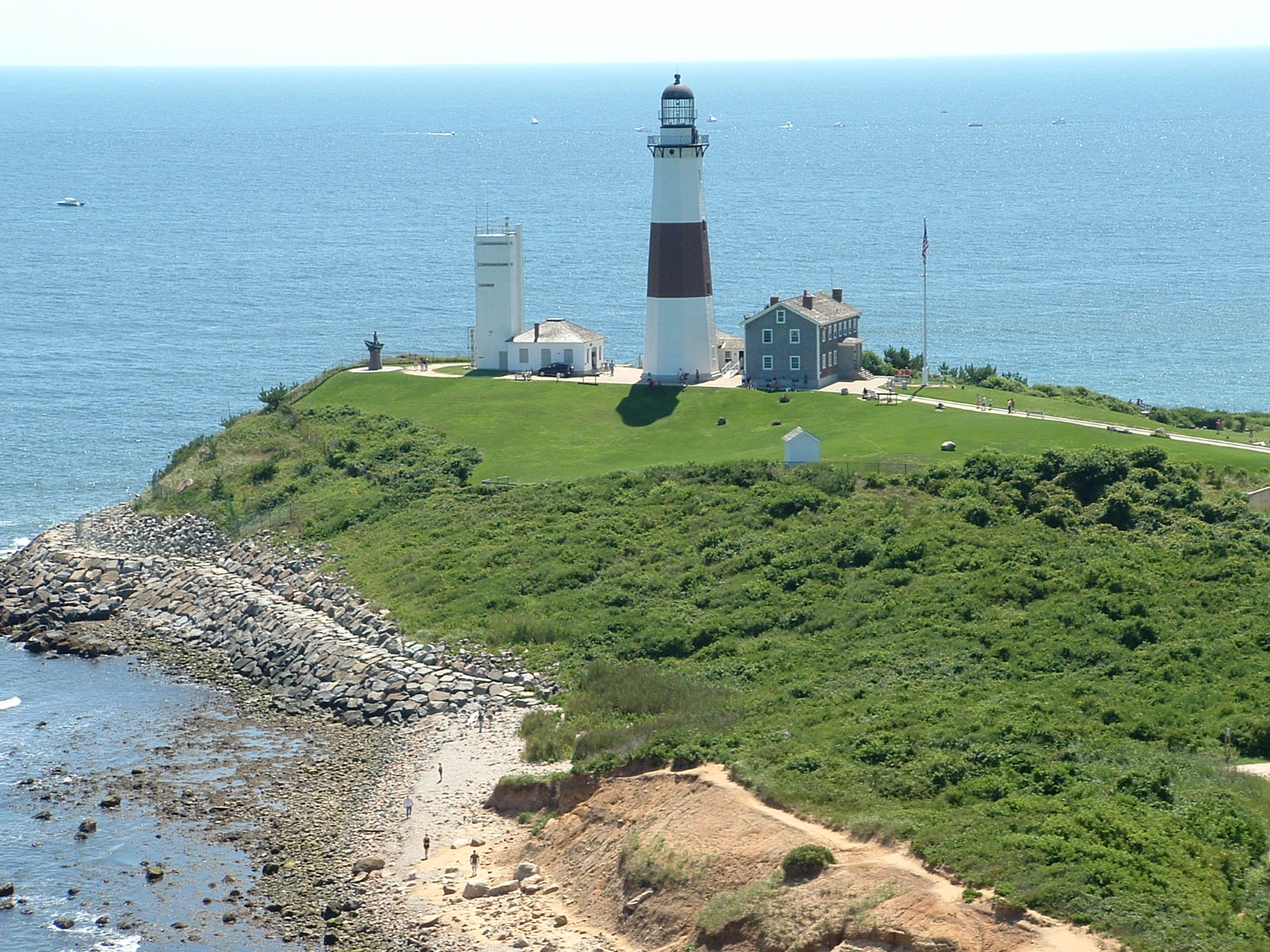

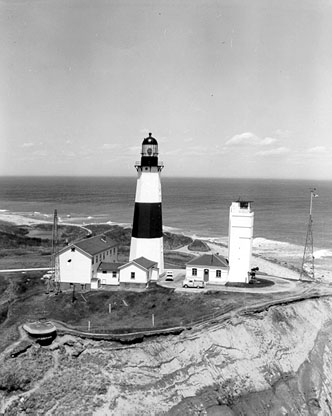

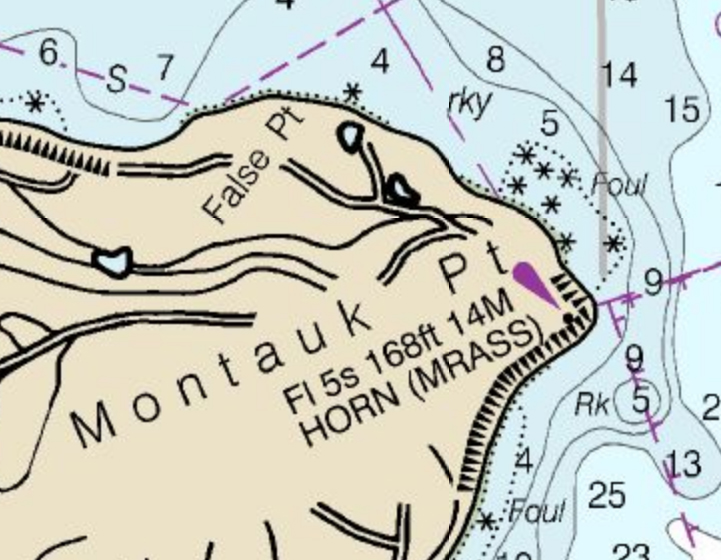
Montauk Point Lighthouse, on a NOAA nautical chart
