= Camp Hero State Park =

Public park on Long Island, New York

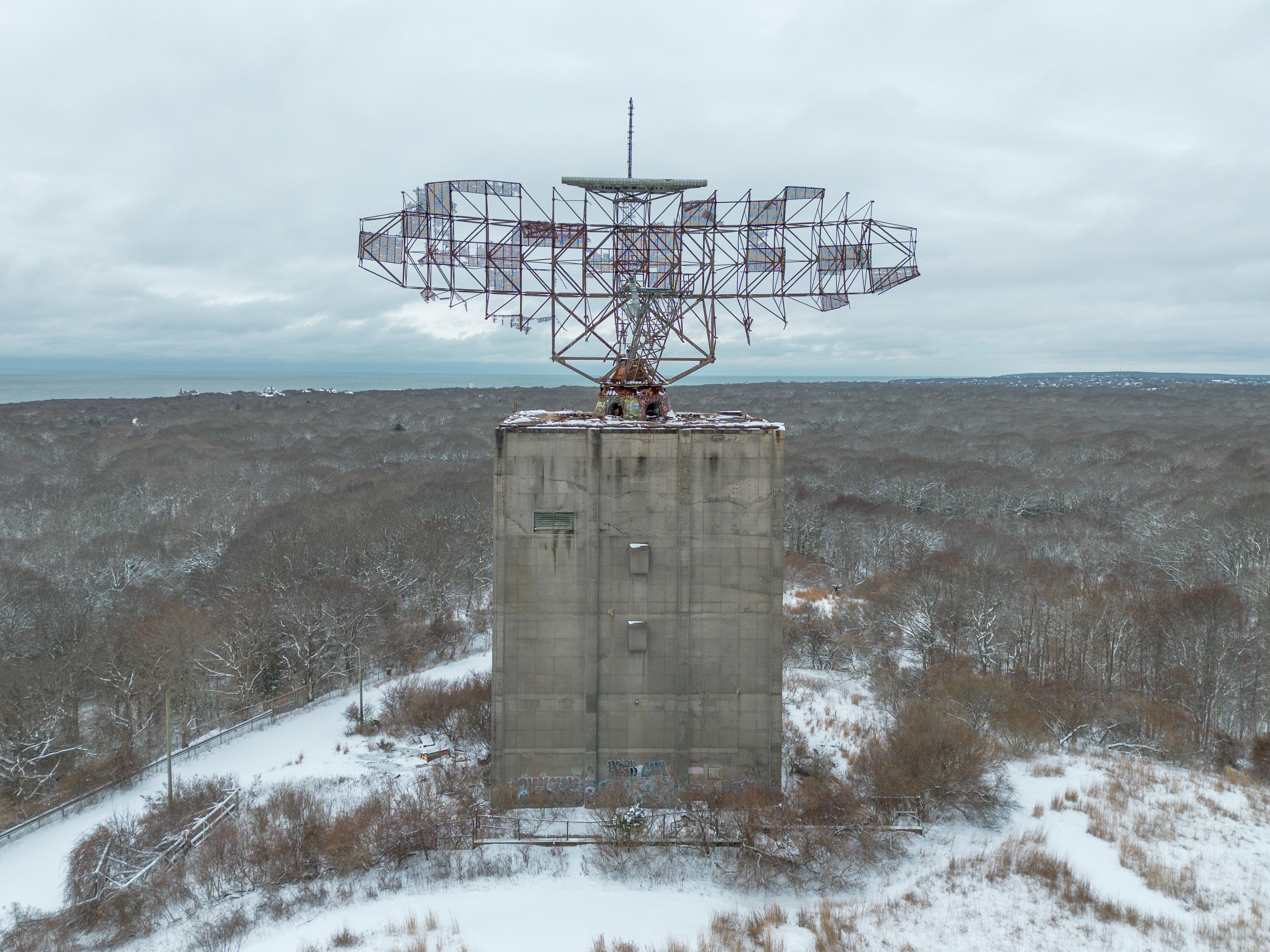
- An abandoned AN/FPS-35 radar tower at Camp Hero State Park in 2025.

- Location within New York
- Type: State park
- Location: 1898 Montauk Highway; Montauk, New York
- Nearest city: Montauk, New York
- Coordinates: 41°04′14″N 71°52′16″W
- Area: 3.05 square kilometres (1.18 sq mi)
- Created: 2002
- Operator: New York State Office of Parks, Recreation and Historic Preservation
- Visitors: 353,285 (in 2024)
- Open: All year
- Website: Camp Hero State Park {http://parks.ny.gov/parks/97/details.aspx}

Camp Hero State Park is a 3.05-square-kilometre (1.18 sq mi) state park located on Montauk Point, New York. The park occupies a portion of the former Montauk Air Force Station.

== History ==
=== Military use ===
The site known as Camp Hero, or the Montauk Air Force Station, was initially commissioned by the U.S. Army in 1942. Camp Hero was initially a coastal defense station disguised as a fishing village, and its location was chosen to prevent a potential invasion of New York from the sea. Camp Hero was named after Major General Andrew Hero, Jr., the Army's commander of coastal artillery, who died in 1942. Three gun batteries were built at Camp Hero, replacing most of the other heavy guns in the Harbor Defenses of Long Island Sound, which also included Fort H. G. Wright, Fort Michie, and Fort Terry. Two batteries of two 16-inch guns each were built, Batteries 112 and 113 (officially named Battery Dunn). Another battery of two 6-inch guns was also built, Battery 216. All three batteries consisted mainly of a large concrete bunker covered with earth, containing ammunition magazines and fire control equipment. The 16-inch guns were protected by large casemates, and the 6-inch guns by shields.

In 1992, Preston Nichols and Peter Moon wrote The Montauk Project: Experiments in Time, in which they alleged that secret experiments were carried out at the Camp Hero site. The book was popular with conspiracy theorists and spawned several sequels.

In 2021, Jason Caldwell wrote 180 Days in Montauk. This book also used the theory of secret experiments in time travel. It evolved into the Montauk Series about a family who used the past to be secretly very successful in the current time.

=== Post-military use ===
In 1984, the General Services Administration attempted to sell the entire facility to real estate developers. Local environmental activists protested, claiming that the site had many unique ecosystems and animal habitats. The remaining portions of the military reservation at Montauk were decommissioned. Most of the facility, including Camp Hero, was donated to the National Park Service, which then turned it over to the New York State Office of Parks, Recreation and Historic Preservation. Portions not deemed environmentally sensitive were sold off.

Camp Hero remained largely undeveloped through the 1980s and 1990s. In 1996, a feasibility study was undertaken to develop the site into a golf course. However, environmentalists were concerned that the golf course would impact rare species of plants and endangered wildlife such as the blue-spotted salamander and eastern tiger salamander, and that irrigation would deplete limited sources of groundwater on the peninsula. Although there was a demand to create new golf courses on Long Island, particularly on the East End, the idea of creating a new golf course in Montauk in addition to Montauk Downs State Park was dropped in 1999.

Camp Hero State Park was opened on September 18, 2002. There are plans to create a museum and an interpretive center that will focus on World War II and Cold War history inside the radar tower. Some parts of the camp remained closed off and guarded, especially the areas near the old radar installations.

== Park description ==
Camp Hero State Park offers picnic areas, a beach, and trails for hiking, biking, horseback riding, and cross-country skiing. It is a popular surf fishing beach due to the underwater structure that tends to hold fish. Common game fish found in this area are striped bass and bluefish.

Portions of the former military installation within the park are registered as a National Historic Site.

== See also ==
- List of New York state parks
- Seacoast defense in the United States
- Harbor Defenses of Long Island Sound
- United States Army Coast Artillery Corps
