= Montauk Project =

UFO conspiracy theory

Coordinates: 41°03′44″N 71°52′26″W

The Montauk Project is a conspiracy theory that alleges there were a series of United States government projects conducted at Camp Hero or Montauk Air Force Station in Montauk, New York, for the purpose of developing psychological warfare techniques and exotic research including time travel. The story of the Montauk Project originated in the Montauk Project series of books by Preston Nichols which intermixes those stories with stories about the Bulgarian Experiment.

== Origin ==
Stories about the Montauk Project have circulated since the early 1980s. According to UFO researcher Jacques Vallée, the Montauk Experiment stories seem to have originated with the highly questionable account of Preston Nichols and Al Bielek, who both claimed to have recovered repressed memories of their own involvement. Preston Nichols also claims that he was periodically abducted to continue his participation against his will. Nichols, born May 24, 1946, on Long Island, New York, claims to have degrees in parapsychology, psychology, and electrical engineering, and he has written a series of books, known as the Montauk Project series, along with Peter Moon, whose real name is Vincent Barbarick. The primary topic of the Montauk Project concerns the alleged activities at Montauk Point. These center on topics including United States government/military experiments in fields such as time travel, teleportation, mind control, contact with extraterrestrial life, and staging faked Apollo Moon landings, framed as developments that followed the 1943 Philadelphia Experiment.

Both Peter Moon and Preston Nichols have encouraged speculation about the contents; for example, they wrote, "Whether you read this as science fiction or non-fiction you are in for an amazing story" in their first chapter, describing much of the content as "soft facts" in a Guide For Readers and publishing a newsletter with updates to the story.

The work has been characterized as fiction.

== In media ==
In 2015, Montauk Chronicles, a film adaptation of the conspiracy featuring Preston Nichols, Alfred Bielek, and Stewart Swerdlow, was released online and on DVD and Blu-ray. The film won the best documentary award at the Philip K. Dick Film Festival in New York City and has been featured on Coast to Coast AM and The Huffington Post.

The Netflix TV series Stranger Things (2016-2025) was inspired by stories of the Montauk Project, and at one time Montauk was used as its working title.

The Montauk Experiment was featured on a season 8 episode of Discovery Channel's Mysteries of the Abandoned on October 23, 2003. The episode, titled, "The Montauk Conspiracy" documented the conspiracies that "swirled around an abandoned military base" (Camp Hero) on Long Island. Experts discussed the critical role that the base played in defending America's coastline. It was featured in a 2023 season 10 episode of the Science Channel's Mysteries of the Abandoned.

== See also ==
- List of conspiracy theories
- Project MKUltra
