= John Jermain Memorial Library =

Library in Sag Harbor, New York, US

- U.S. Historic district – Contributing property
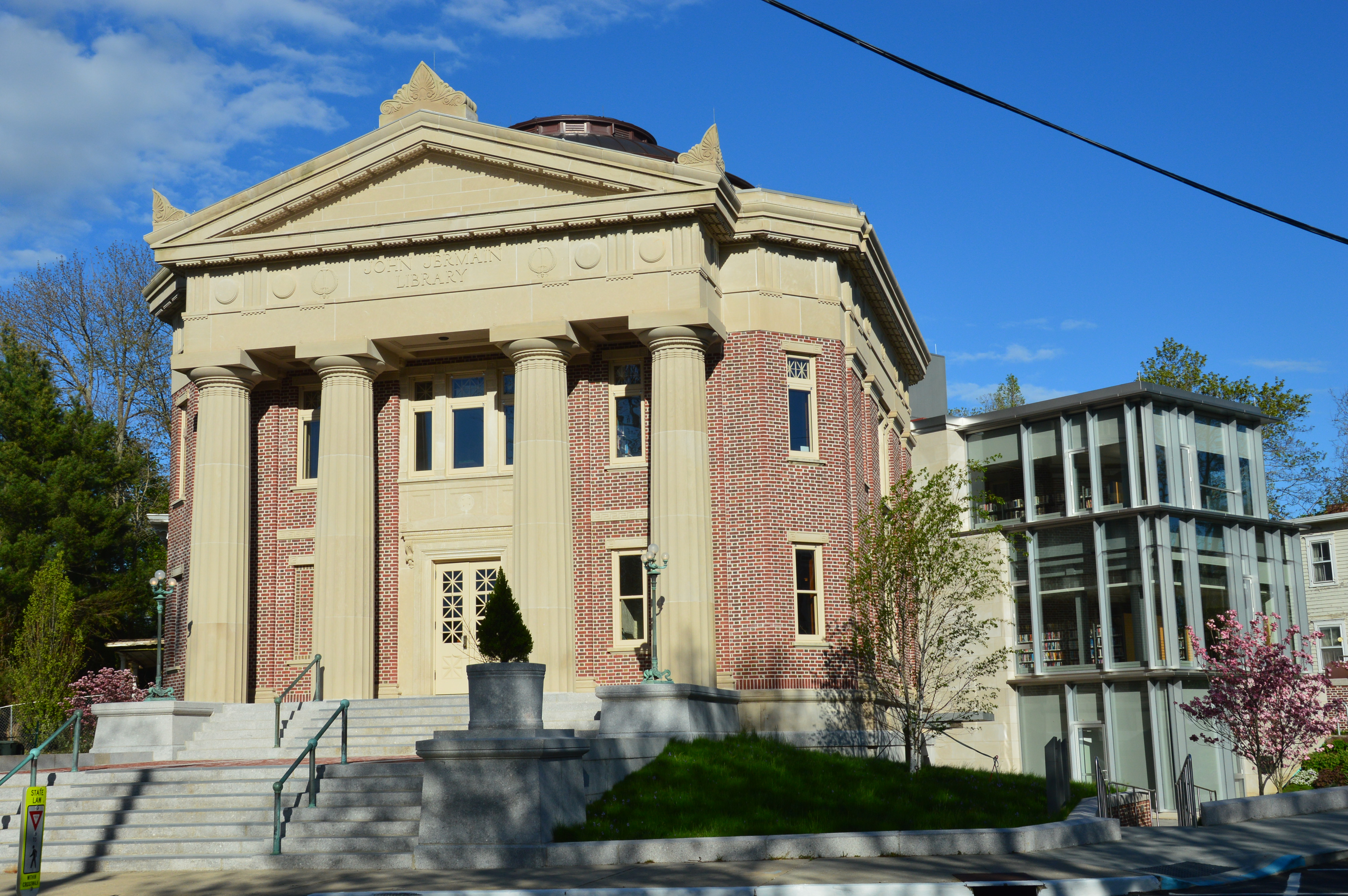
- The library as seen in 2017.

- Location within New York Location within the United States
- Interactive map showing the location of John Jermain Memorial Library
- Location: 201 Main Street, Sag Harbor, New York
- Coordinates: 40°59′51″N 72°17′47″W
- Built: 1910
- Part of: Sag Harbor Village District (ID94000400)
- Designated CP: May 10, 1994
- Type: Public
- Established: 1910

Other information
- Director: Kelly Harris
- Website: www.johnjermain.org

The John Jermain Memorial Library is a public library located in Sag Harbor, Suffolk County, New York. Built in 1910, it serves the residents of the Sag Harbor Union Free School District, which includes the Village of Sag Harbor, the Village of North Haven, Noyac, and Mount Misery, Eastville, and Baypoint neighborhoods. It is a contributing structure to the National Register Sag Harbor Historic District and since 2015, a founding member of the Sag Harbor Cultural District.

== History ==
The library was funded and gifted to the people of Sag Harbor by philanthropist Margaret Olivia Slocum Sage, who lived in what is now the Sag Harbor Whaling Museum. Named in honor of her grandfather, Major John Jermain, the Greek classical revival building was designed by Augustus N. Allen. The glass dome on the third floor rotunda was built by the R. Guastavino Company. On October 10, 1910, the doors opened to the public. Owing to the large immigrant population of Sag Harbor in the early 20th century, the library opened with a large collection of books in Polish, German, Italian, French, and Hebrew. Olive Pratt Young was the first librarian. Soon after she was hired, English classes for immigrants were also offered, along with cultural activities, lectures, exhibits, and starting in 1917, Victrola listening nights. In 1911, Sage helped finance local pharmacist and Algonquian linguist William Wallace Tooker’s book Indian Place-Names on Long Island. The book was published for the library by G.P. Putnam’s Sons. Along with the book, Tooker’s personal library and a portion of his personal papers were donated to the library. With Sage’s own personal donations of objects and documents, the History Room collection was formed.

In 1926, Russella J. Hazard was hired at the library. She was put in charge of the History Room and had a deep interest in Sag Harbor’s whaling history. Her notes and unpublished manuscript are held in the History Room collection. In 1959, she was appointed head librarian, taking over from retiring librarian Elizabeth Philips.

During the 1938 Hurricane, a tree fell through the library, creating a long crack in the terrazzo floor of the entrance. When the library was restored in 2016, the crack was inlayed with bonded bronze to preserve the physical remnants of that moment in history.

Since 1974, the non-profit Friends of the Library have held an historic house tour fundraiser every summer.

In 1978, Dorothy Ingersoll Zaykowski began working at the library and was put in charge of organizing the History Room, which had been left without a dedicated caretaker since Russella Hazard’s retirement in 1970. Zaykowski created copious notes and vertical files for streets, houses, buildings, families, etc. During this time, she wrote local history articles for The Sag Harbor Express. In 1991, she published all of these articles in one volume, Sag Harbor: The Story of an American Beauty.

== Renovation ==
During the 1950s, the library’s age had noticeably started to show. By the 1990s, water leaked through the Guastavino dome, the plumbing was in poor condition, the original bricks began to crumble, it did not have an elevator, and every corner of the building was overflowing with materials. Ever since the library had opened, physical shelving space presented an issue. As the library’s holdings grew, there was not enough space to continually add to the collections nor adequate space for programs and staff offices.

Several ideas had been suggested for expansion. In 2004, a group called the John Jermain Future Fund attempted to purchase the crumbling house next door on Union Street. The owners of the house would not accept the Fund’s bid. In the same year, a referendum to have two buildings, the original and one adjacent to nearby Mashashimuet Park, also failed to pass.

In 2009, Sag Harbor voters approved $10 million for the restoration and expansion of the original aging building. The total cost of the renovation was $16 million, a third of it funded by private donations. While construction occurred from 2011 to 2016, the library was temporarily located at 34 West Water Street. The entire original building was restored, including the Guastavino dome in the rotunda. Designed by Newman Architects, a new building with large glass windows connects to the original building through large open doorways. During this process, a dedicated community program room was built, an elevator installed, and a secured climate controlled archives room for the local history and special collections materials created.

=== Re-opening, 2016-present ===
On July 23, 2016, the library moved back to its original location at 201 Main Street. The day was celebrated with a "book brigade" from the temporary location on West Water Street to the newly restored and expanded building on Main Street. Hundreds of locals lined the street to pass former History Room librarian Dorothy Ingersoll Zaykowski’s book Sag Harbor: The Story of An American Beauty from one person to another. Zaykowski herself was the final person to receive the book and the first person to check out the book in the newly renovated space.
