= Joseph Pintauro =

American academic and writer (1930–2018)

Joseph T. Pintauro
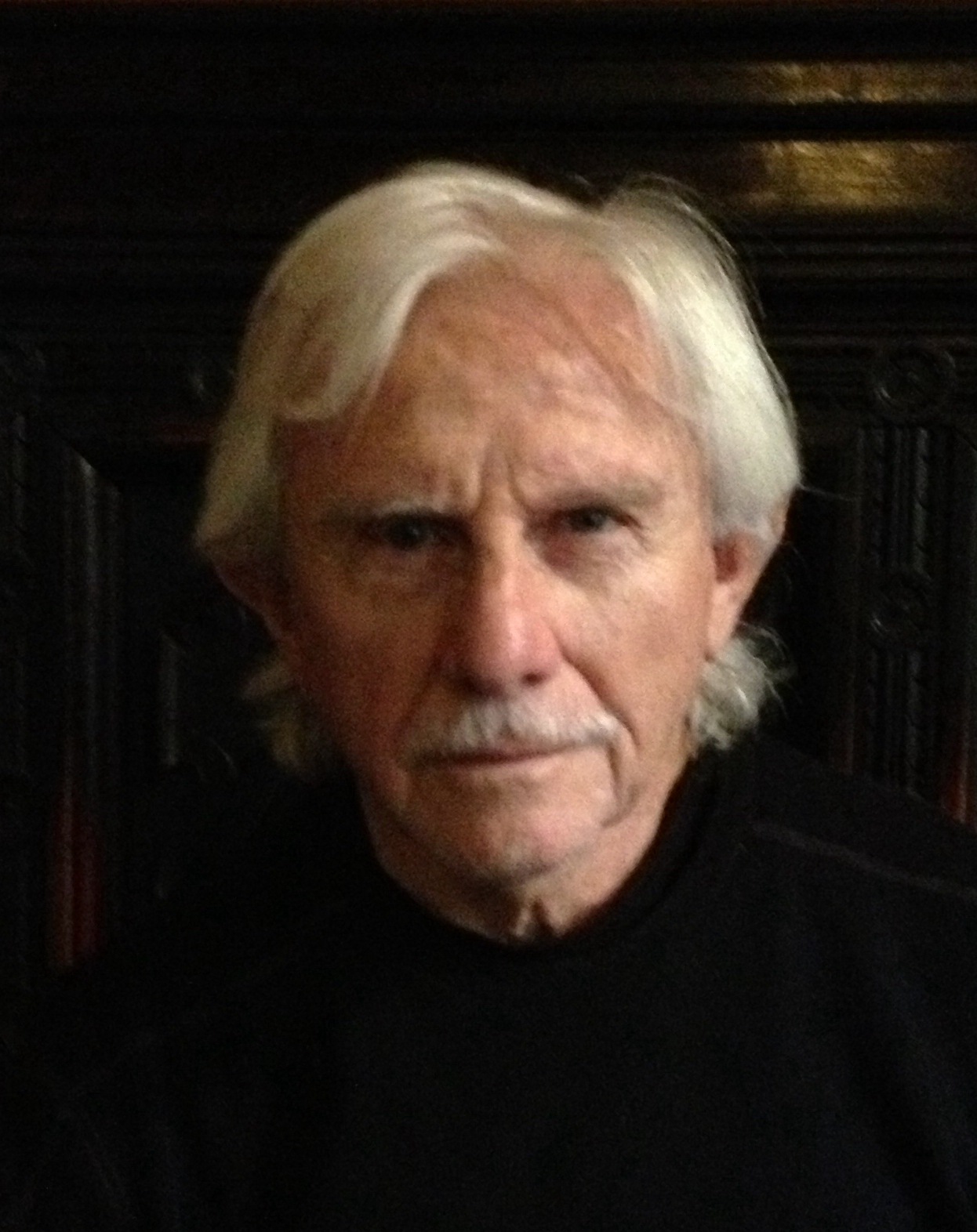
- Caffe Reggio, New York City; January 2013
- Born: November 22, 1930; Queens, New York, U.S.
- Died: May 29, 2018 (aged 87); Sag Harbor, New York, U.S.
- Occupations: Academic, writer
- Spouse: Greg Therriault (m. 2013)

Joe Pintauro (November 22, 1930 – May 29, 2018) was an American academic, novelist, playwright and poet.

== Early life and education ==
Joe Pintauro was born on November 22, 1930, in Queens, New York. His father, Aniello Pintauro, was a cabinetmaker, and his mother was Carmela (Iovino) Pintauro. He had two older siblings, a brother named Anthony (Tony) who was three years older and a sister named Mildred who was fifteen years older. He grew up in the Ozone Park neighborhood of Queens.

Pintauro attended John Adams High School in Queens, and he studied at Manhattan College, before transferring to St. Jerome's College in Waterloo, Ontario, where he graduated in 1953 with a degree in philosophy and Latin. After attending Our Lady of Angels Seminary at Niagara University, he was ordained a priest in 1958. While working as a priest Pintauro attended Fordham University to work on a master's degree in American Literature.

In 1966 Pintauro left the priesthood, finding work as a copy writer and a poet.

== Career ==
Pintauro's first published work was To Believe in God, the first of three books of poetry with artwork by Corita Kent, released in 1968. His first novel, Cold Hands, was published in 1979.

Pintauro become known as a playwright whose works often covered the AIDS crisis. His first play, Snow Orchid, was staged in 1982 by New York City's Circle Repertory Company Other plays by Pintauro include Beside Herself (1989), The Dead Boy (1990), Raft of the Medusa (1991), and Men's Lives (1992).

In 1995, Pintauro wrote the short play Dawn as part of a production, commissioned by the Bay Street Theater in Sag Harbor, New York, of three short beach plays featuring work by playwrights Lanford Wilson and Terrence McNally entitled By the Sea, By the Sea, by the Beautiful Sea.

Pintauro taught playwriting at Southampton College, he taught fiction writing at Sarah Lawrence College and at New York University Tisch School of the Arts, and he taught filmmaking at Marymount Manhattan College and at the School of Visual Arts.

Theater awards include: Eugene O’Neill, National Playwrights Conference, Snow Orchid (1980); Eugene O’Neill, National Playwrights Conference, The Dead Boy (1998); The John Steinbeck Literary Award (2005); and Guild Hall of East Hampton, Lifetime Achievement Award in the Literary Arts (2006)

In 2018, Pintauro bequeathed his literary archives to the John Jermain Memorial Library.

== Publications ==
=== Drama ===
- Cacciatore, Actors Repertory Theatre, Inc. in New York, NY, in 1977.
- Snow Orchid, produced by the Circle Repertory Company in New York, NY, in 1982.
- Metropolitan Operas: 27 Short Plays, commissioned by Circle Repertory Theater in New York, NY, in 1985.
- Beside Herself, produced by the Circle Repertory Company in New York, NY, in 1989.
- The Dead Boy, Royal Court, London, in 1991.
- Raft of the Medusa, produced by the Minetta Lane Theater in New York, NY, in 1991.
- Men’s Lives, Bay Street Theater (inaugural production), Sag Harbor, NY, in 1992.
- "Dawn", By the Sea, By the Sea, By the Beautiful Sea, produced by the Bay Street Theatre in Sag Harbor, NY, in 1995.
- What I Did For Love, produced at Guild Hall in East Hampton, NY, in 2002.
- Cathedral, produced by the Manhattan Theater Source in New York, NY, in 2009.

=== Poetry ===
- To Believe in God, Harper and Row (New York, NY), 1968
- To Believe in Man, Harper and Row (New York, NY), 1970
- To Believe in Things, Harper and Row (New York, NY) 1971
- Seasonal Quartet: Rainbow Box, four books in a cube, art by Norman LaLiberte, Harper & Row 1970
- One Circus, Three Rings, Forever and Ever, Hooray!, Harper and Row (New York, NY), 1969.
- Kites at Empty Airports, Harper and Row (New York, NY), 1972.
- The Earth Mass, Harper and Row (New York, NY), 1973.

=== Novels ===
- Cold Hands, Simon and Schuster (New York, NY), 1979.
- State of Grace, Times Books (New York, NY), 1983.
- The River of Heaven. Unpublished (Sag Harbor, NY), 2018.

== Personal life ==
Pintauro and his partner of 40 years, Greg Therriault, married in 2013.

Pintauro died in Sag Harbor, New York, on May 29, 2018, at the age of 87, of complications from metastatic prostate cancer.
