= John William Campbell =

John William Campbell may refer to:

- Sir John Campbell, 1st Baronet (1836–1915), major-general in the British Army
- John W. Campbell (financier) (1880–1957), American financier from New York

== See also ==
- John Campbell (disambiguation)
- Will Campbell (offensive lineman), full name John William Campbell
