= E. Lilian Todd =

American aviation pioneer (1865–1937)

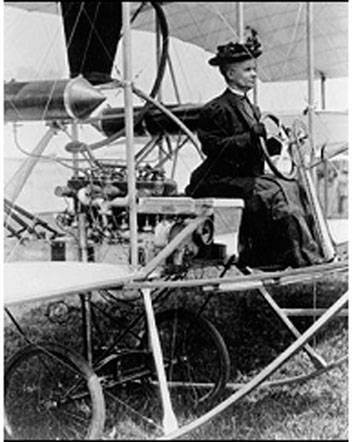
- Todd in 1907
- Born: June 12, 1865; Washington, D.C., U.S.
- Died: 26 September 1937 (aged 72); Pasadena, California
- Occupations: inventor, American aviation pioneer
- Known for: first woman in the world to design airplanes

Emma Lilian Todd (June 12, 1865 – September 26, 1937), originally from Washington, D.C., and later New York City, was a self-taught inventor who grew up with a love for mechanical devices. The New York Times issue of November 28, 1909, identified her as the first woman in the world to design airplanes, which she started in 1906 or earlier. In 1910, her last design flew, test-piloted by Didier Masson.

== Childhood ==
Todd was born in Washington, D.C., on June 12, 1865. The 1870 U.S. census lists her as "Lily," living with her mother Mary Todd and her sister Cora in the U.S. capital. Her father is not mentioned in the census, however. In the November 1909 issue of Woman's Home Companion, an autobiographical article mentions her grandfather (probably on her mother's side), from whom she inherited her mechanical and inventive talent. Todd's death certificate lists her mother's maiden name as "Unknown Reynolds" and her father as "Unknown Todd".

== Adulthood ==
Todd received her education in Washington, D.C., and taught herself typewriting to earn a living. Her first job was at the Patent Office, but she left two years later to work in the office of the governor of Pennsylvania (she states in her article that she became the first woman to receive an appointment in the executive department of that state). Then she went back to New York to continue her work with patents, began to study law, and became a member of the first Woman's Law Class of New York University (circa 1890). In 1896, she was issued a patent for a typewriter copy-holder (number 553292) which she shared with George W. Parker. Todd later worked as a secretary to the director-general of the Women's National War Relief Association during the Spanish–American War.

Around 1903, Todd turned her attention to "mechanical and aeronautic toys." She was further inspired after seeing airships in London and at the 1904 Louisiana Purchase Exposition in St. Louis, as well as a sketch of an airplane in a 1906 Parisian newspaper. Later that year, Todd attracted national attention when she exhibited her first design at Madison Square Garden in an aero show. Philanthropist Olivia Sage, the widow of financier and politician Russell Sage, was among those interested in Todd's work. Mrs. Sage became Todd's patron and gave her $7,000 to design and build her aircraft. Todd's first full-sized biplane began construction as early as the fall of 1908 by the Wittemann Brothers of Staten Island.

=== Airplane ===
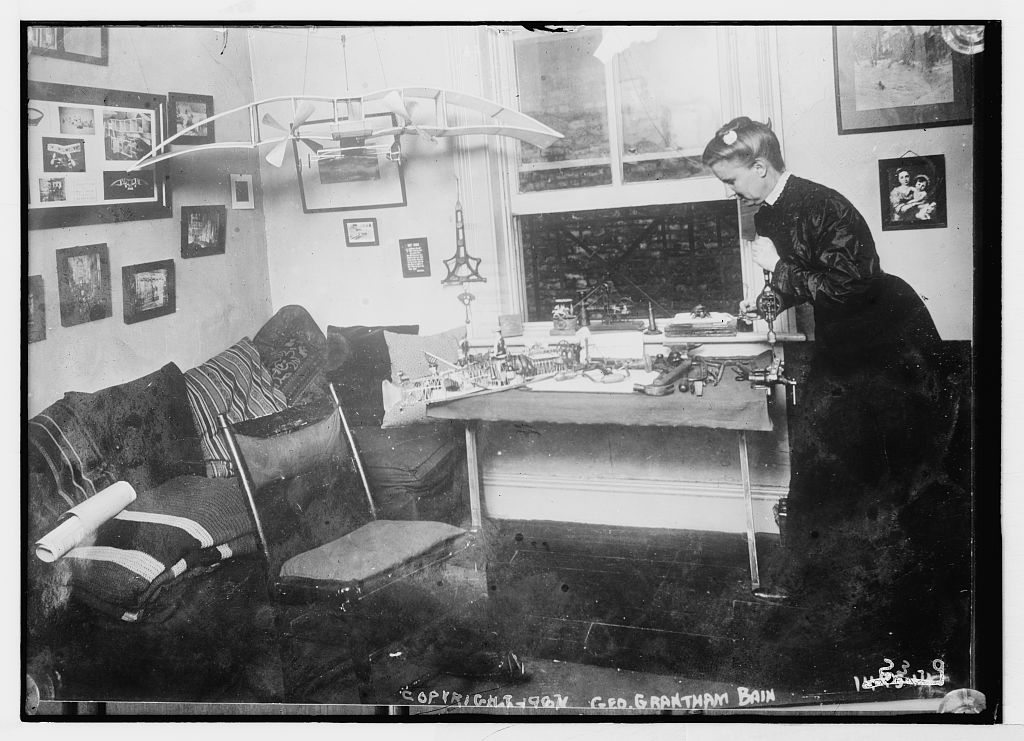
Todd with various aeronautical displays, 1907

The framework was constructed out of straight-grained spruce, the upper coverings of the wings were muslin, the lower covering was seven-ounce army duck. Piano wire held the wings together. The airplane had two seats, and was 36 ft (11 m) in length, powered by modified Rinek motor.

Realizing the importance of aviation, Todd started the first Junior Aero Club in 1908 to foster the education of future aviators. The club met at Todd's residence in New York, where her living room had become her workshop and was decorated by aircraft models of her own design and other mechanical toys. Todd was also credited with inventing and patenting a cabinet with a folding table, a cannon that could be triggered by solar power, a sundial, and an aeolian harp device that could be attached to a tree.

As she mentions in the 1909 article, Todd wanted to pilot her own airplane and applied for permission at the Richmond Borough Commissioner of Public Works. She also considered applying for a permit to fly it anywhere in the United States. Her permit was denied, however. Nevertheless, on November 7, 1910, the aircraft made a powered hop of 20 ft (6.1 m) over the Garden City aviation field with Didier Masson at the controls, but proved unable to sustain flight.

Todd's career in airplane design ended abruptly after she was hired by Mrs. Sage as her personal secretary in January 1911, despite Mrs. Sage's interest in aviation and the financing of Todd's biplane. Todd worked closely with Sage on the latter's major philanthropy.

== Later years ==
After the death of Mrs. Sage, Todd moved to Pasadena, California, during the first half of the 1920s, as noted in the Voter Registrations of 1924 and onward. She moved to Corona Del Mar, California, in 1936. Todd died on September 26, 1937, at Huntington Memorial Hospital in Pasadena. Her body was cremated and her remains were sent to New York where they were buried on June 8, 1938, in the Moravian Cemetery on Staten Island.

== Cultural references ==
In 2013, director and animator Kristina Yee created a short film entitled "Miss Todd" with a student team at the National Film and Television School. "'Miss Todd' is a short, stop-motion, musical animation about the first woman in the world to build and design an airplane." The film is inspired by E. Lillian Todd. The film won the Foreign Film Award Gold Medal at the 2013 Student Academy Awards. Additionally, the team put out a book entitled "Miss Todd and Her Wonderful Flying Machine," published by Compendium, Inc.

In 2015, the music artist Elizaveta released the video "Icarus," which entirely features animation from "Miss Todd."

In 2020, Calkins Creek published a non-fiction picture book about Lilian Todd, WOOD, WIRE, WINGS: Emma Lilian Todd Invents an Airplane, by Kirsten W. Larson, illustrated by Tracy Subisak. The book is for ages seven and up.
