= Timeline of Grand Central Terminal =

Coordinates: 40°45′10″N 73°58′38″W

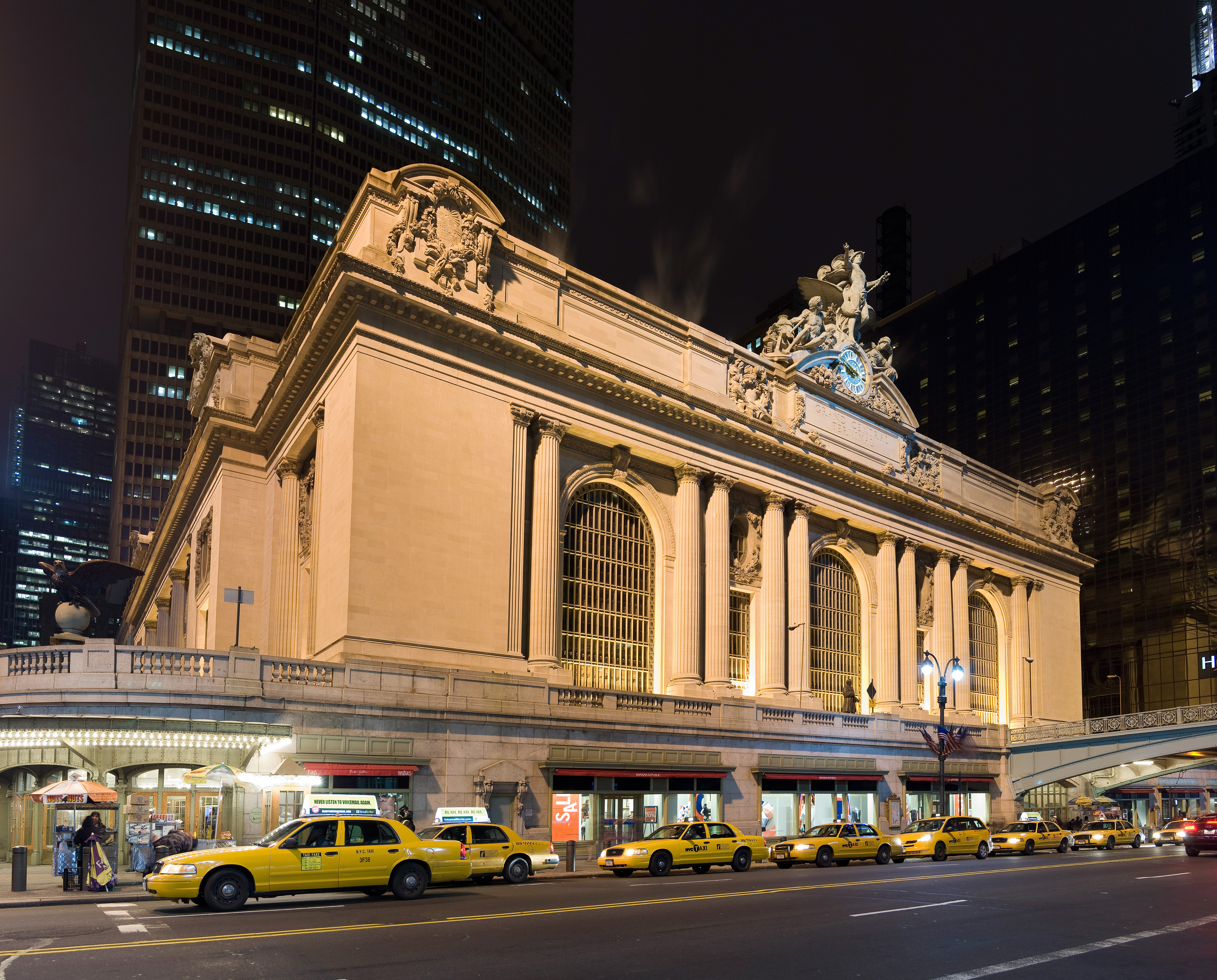
42nd Street exterior at night

Grand Central Terminal is a major commuter rail terminal in Midtown Manhattan, New York City, serving the Metro-North Railroad's Harlem, Hudson and New Haven Lines. It is the most recent of three functionally similar buildings on the same site. The current structure was built by and named for the New York Central Railroad, though it also served New York Central's successors as well as the New York, New Haven and Hartford Railroad.

== 19th century ==
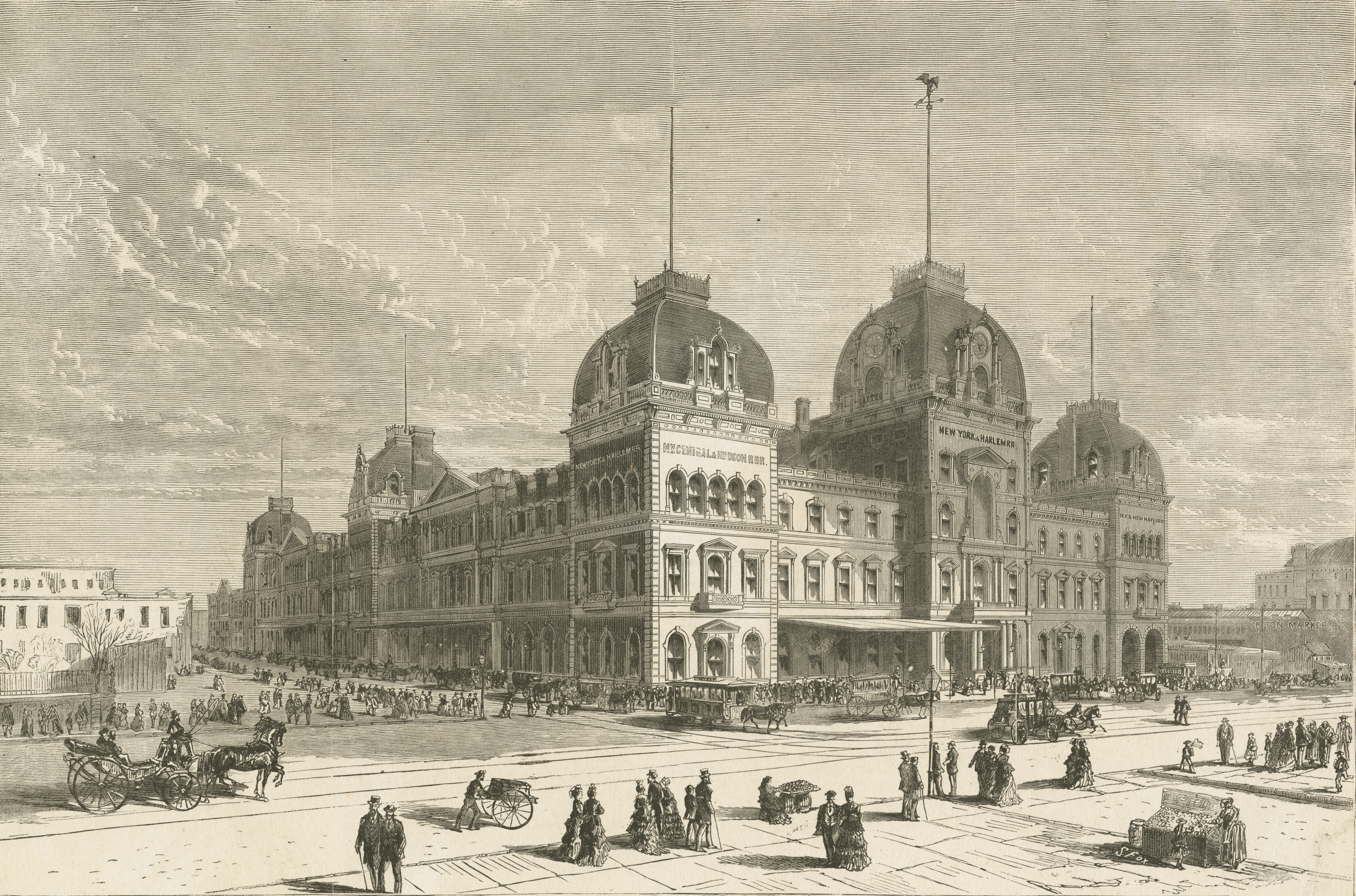
Grand Central Depot

- September 1, 1869 – October 1871: Grand Central Depot is constructed.
- November 1, 1869: The Hudson River Railroad merges with the New York Central Railroad, forming the New York Central & Hudson River Railroad.
- July 1872: The New York & New Haven Railroad merges with the Hartford & New Haven Railroad, forming the New York, New Haven and Hartford Railroad.
- April 1, 1873: The New York & Harlem Railroad merges into the New York Central & Hudson River Railroad.

== 20th century ==
- 1900: Grand Central Depot is redesigned and reopens as Grand Central Station.
- 1902: A crash in the Park Avenue Tunnel spurs the railroad's electrification and a new terminal.
- 1903: Architecture firms are invited to compete in designing Grand Central Terminal.
- June 19, 1903: Grand Central Terminal's construction begins.
- February 1904: Warren and Wetmore, along with Reed and Stem, agree to become the "associated architects of Grand Central Terminal", co-designing the terminal.
- June 5, 1910: The last train departed the old Grand Central Station; demolition of the building was to start later that day.
- February 1, 1913: Grand Central Terminal's opening is celebrated with a private dinner for the architects at the Grand Central Terminal Restaurant.
- February 2, 1913: Grand Central Terminal opens.

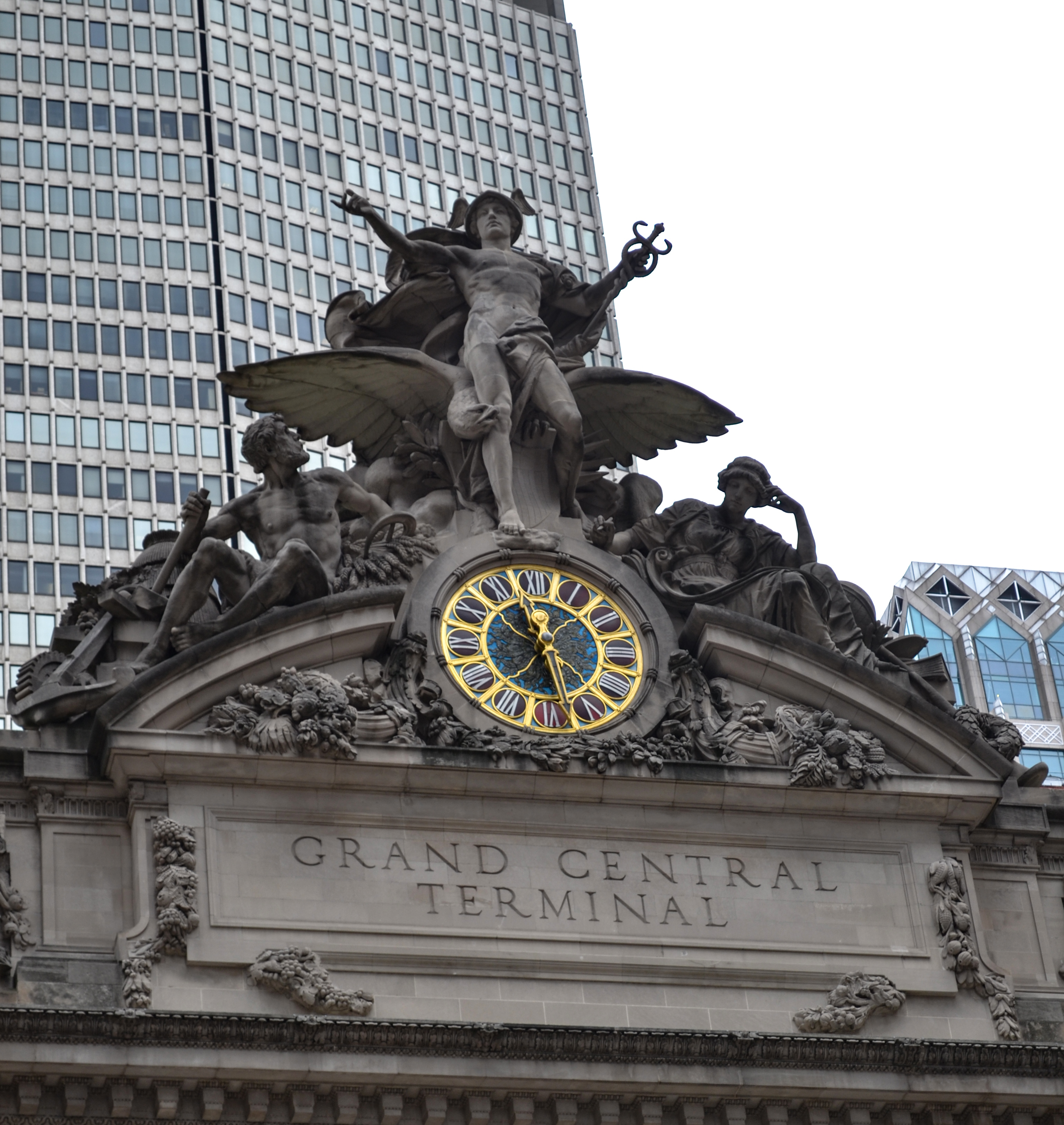
Glory of Commerce, a sculptural group by Jules-Félix Coutan

- 1914: The Glory of Commerce sculpture is installed on the terminal's facade.
- December 1914: The "New York Central Railroad" is reestablished with the merging of various railroads into the New York Central & Hudson River Railroad.
- 1919: One leg of the Park Avenue Viaduct opens.
- 1923–24: The Grand Central Art Galleries and the Grand Central School of Art open in the terminal, both remaining there until the 1950s.
- 1926: The Graybar Passage opens, built on the first floor of the newly-opened Graybar Building.
- 1928: The other leg of the Park Avenue Viaduct opens.
- 1929: Ernst Plassmann's statue of Cornelius Vanderbilt is moved to Grand Central Terminal.
- 1944: The Main Concourse ceiling is irreparably damaged and covered over with boards, replicating the original celestial design.
- 1966: The Vanderbilt Tennis Club opens in a space directly above Vanderbilt Hall.
- February 1, 1968: The New York Central Railroad merges with the Pennsylvania Railroad, forming the Penn Central Railroad.
- December 31, 1968: The New York, New Haven & Hartford Railroad merges into the Penn Central Railroad.
- September 11, 1976: Croatian nationalists plant a bomb in a coin locker in Grand Central; its deactivation kills a bomb squad specialist and injures three others.
- April 7, 1991: Amtrak stops service at Grand Central, ending its 78-year role as an intercity rail terminal.
- 1994–1999: Grand Central North, a series of tunnels between the terminal and streets to its north, is constructed.

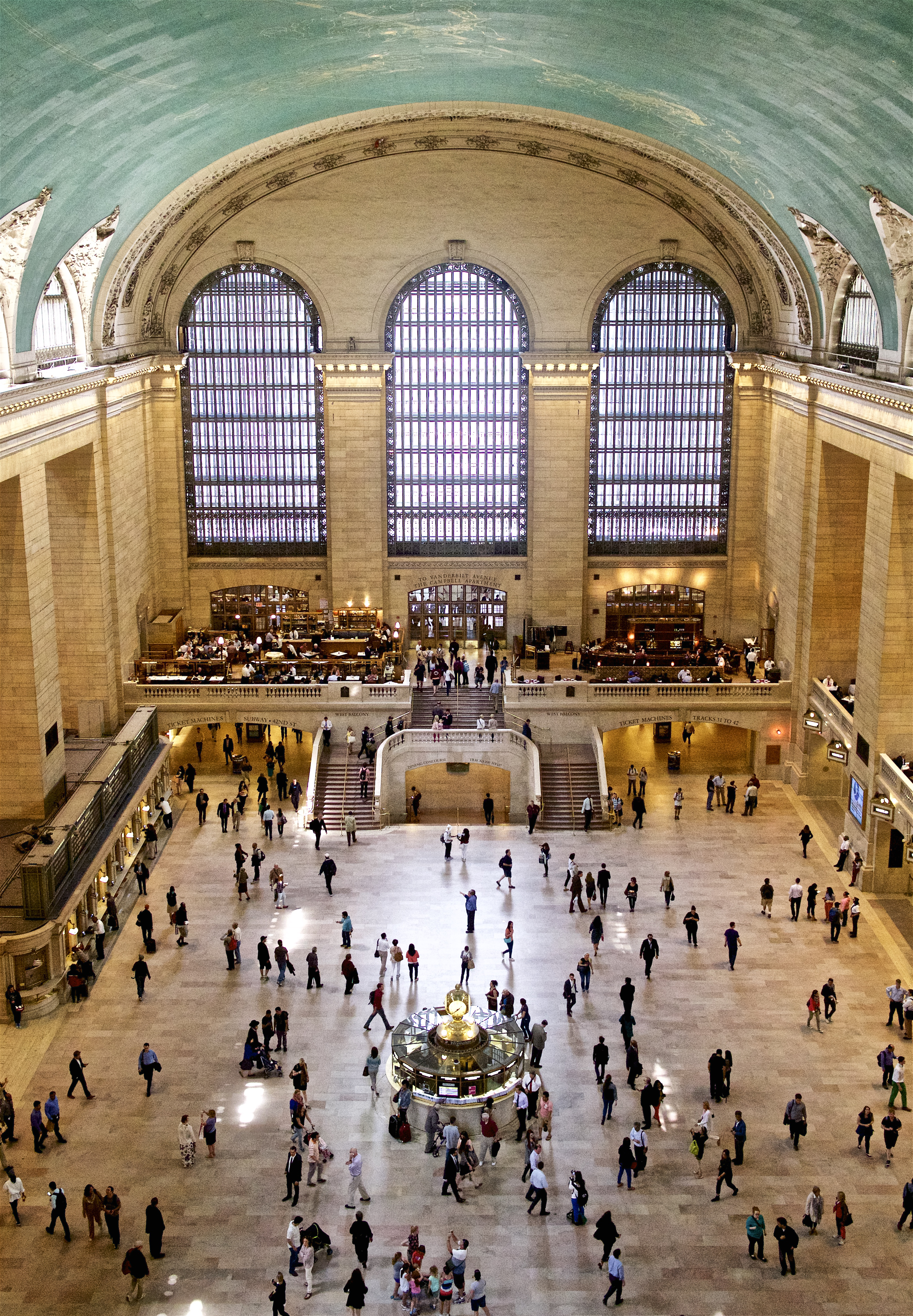
A late-1990s renovation brought the main concourse of Grand Central Terminal to its current configuration, shown here in 2014.

- 1995–1998: The terminal is renovated close to its original appearance; all billboards are removed, the 1944 celestial ceiling is cleaned, the waiting room is renovated and reopens to become Vanderbilt Hall, Grand Central Market opens, and the East Stairs are built in the Main Concourse, replicating the design of the West Stairs.
- 1999: The Campbell Apartment first opens as a bar and cocktail lounge, following an extensive renovation.

== 21st century ==
- 2007: East Side Access, a project to bring Long Island Rail Road trains into a new station beneath the terminal, begins.
- February 1, 2013: Numerous displays, performances, and events are held to celebrate the terminal's centennial.
- November 2018: The MTA proposes and confirms its purchase of the terminal, along with the Hudson and Harlem Lines, for $35 million.
- January 25, 2023: Grand Central Madison opens, bringing Long Island Rail Road trains into service beneath Grand Central Terminal.

== See also ==
- History of Grand Central Terminal
- History of New York City
