= First Presbyterian Church of Far Rockaway =

Church in Queens, New York

- Russell Sage Memorial Church
- U.S. National Register of Historic Places
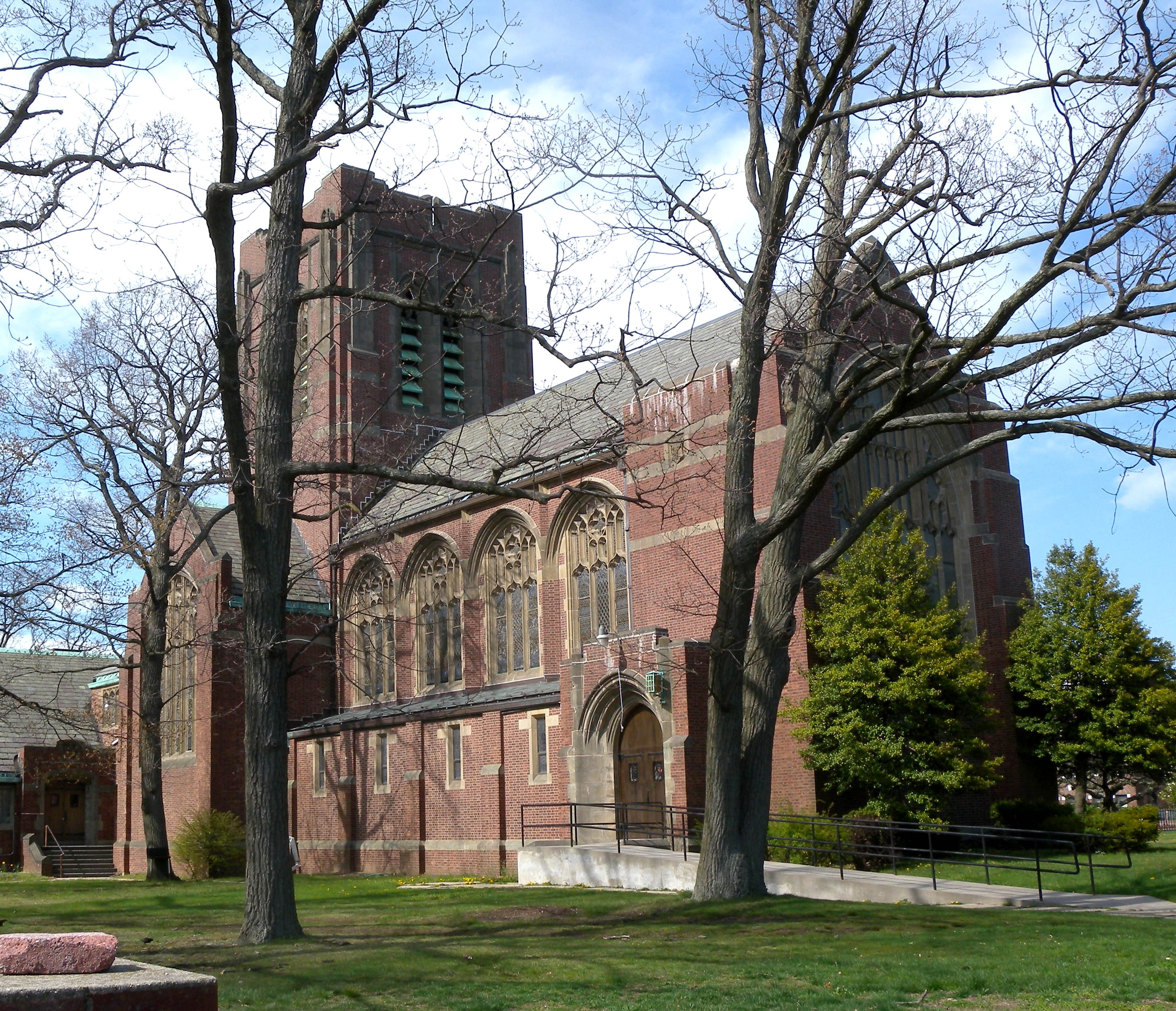
- First Presbyterian Church of Far Rockaway, April 2009

- Location within New York City Location within New York Location within the United States
- Location: 1324 Beach Twelfth St., New York, New York
- Coordinates: 40°36′34″N 73°44′51″W
- Area: 3 acres (1.2 ha)
- Built: 1910
- Architect: Cram, Goodhue & Ferguson; Olmsted Brothers
- Architectural style: Late Gothic Revival, Neo-Gothic style
- NRHP reference No.: 86002678
- Added to NRHP: September 22, 1986

The First Presbyterian Church of Far Rockaway, formerly known as the Russell Sage Memorial Church, is a historic Presbyterian church in the Far Rockaway neighborhood of Queens in New York City. It was commissioned by Olivia Slocum Sage as a memorial to her late husband, Russell Sage (1816–1906), as they used to summer in the area. She also commissioned a large, memorial stained glass window of a landscape, designed by Tiffany Studio.

Designed by the architect Ralph Adams Cram (1863–1942), the church was built between 1908 and 1910 and is a Neo-Gothic-style building laid out in a traditional cruciform plan. It is constructed of brick with concrete trim and a steeply sloping slate-covered roof. Connected to the church are a parish hall and manse. The surrounding landscape, designed by the Olmsted Brothers, is a contributing element to its designation of historic significance.

The church was listed on the National Register of Historic Places in 1986.
