= John Jermain =

John Jordan Jermain
- Born: May 20, 1758
- Died: February 17, 1819 (aged 60)
- Military career
- Rank: Major

Major John Jordan Jermain (May 20, 1758 – February 17, 1819) served in the Westchester Militia during the American Revolution. A library in Sag Harbor, New York was built and named in his honor in 1910.

== Biographical information ==
Jermain was born in White Plains, New York. He joined the Westchester Militia and fought in the American Revolution. Following the war, he moved to Sag Harbor and married Margaret Pierson of Bridgehampton, New York. Together, they had nine children. One of their daughters, Margaret Pierson Jermain, was the mother of Margaret Olivia Slocum Sage, who married Russell Sage, a financier and politician from New York. Major John Jermain died in 1819 in Sag Harbor.

== Memorial library ==
Margaret Sage organized the effort to fund and build the John Jermain Memorial Library in Sag Harbor in honor of her grandfather. The library was designed by Augustus N. Allen and presented as a gift to the people of Sag Harbor in 1910. The property was bought at a cost of $10,000, and was directly across from Mrs. Sage's then summer home on Main Street. At that time, it was the highest price ever paid for a piece of real estate in Sag Harbor.

In 1912, a deed of trust was executed by Mrs. Sage in which the library, its grounds and equipment were deeded to a body of trustees under the laws of New York State. The John Jermain Memorial Library was permanently endowed by Mrs. Sage that it might forever be secured to the people of Sag Harbor and vicinity. She became known as Sag Harbor's greatest benefactor, also providing the village with Pierson High School and Mashashimuet Park. In total, she gave Sag Harbor a total of between $300,000 and $400,000, just a small portion of the $23 million she gave to philanthropy in her lifetime.
