= SS Russell Sage =

World War II Liberty ship of the United States

History

United States
- Name: Russell Sage
- Namesake: Russell Sage
- Owner: War Shipping Administration (WSA)
- Operator: Marine Transport Lines, Inc.
- Ordered: as type (EC2-S-C1) hull, MC hull 1545
- Builder: J.A. Jones Construction, Panama City, Florida
- Cost: $1,333,089
- Yard number: 27
- Way number: 6
- Laid down: 25 November 1943
- Launched: 5 January 1944
- Completed: 29 February 1944
- Identification: Call Signal: KVQK
- Fate: Sold for commercial use, 26 February 1947

Panama
- Name: Glen I
- Owner: Caribbean Land & Shipping Corp, Cristóbal, Colón, Panama
- Operator: T. Gotaas & Co., New York City
- Acquired: 26 February 1947
- Fate: Sold, 1950

Panama
- Name: Glen I (1950–1955); Maria Dolores (1950–1955)
- Owner: Cia. de Nav. La. Cordillera, Chiriquí, Panama (1950–1954); Flamengo Cia. de Nav. Transoceanica (1954–1958); D'Amico Soc. di Nav., Rome (1958–1965)
- Operator: D'Amico Soc. di Nav., Rome (1950–1965)
- Acquired: 1950
- Fate: Sold, 1965

Greece
- Name: Nikolis M
- Owner: Miltiades Navegaceon
- Operator: Mattheos Mavridoglou, Piraeus, Greece
- Acquired: 1965
- Fate: Wrecked, 1967

General characteristics
- Class & type: Liberty ship; type EC2-S-C1, standard
- Tonnage: 10,865 LT DWT; 7,176 GRT
- Displacement: 3,380 long tons (3,434 t) (light); 14,245 long tons (14,474 t) (max)
- Length: 441 feet 6 inches (135 m) oa; 416 feet (127 m) pp; 427 feet (130 m) lwl
- Beam: 57 feet (17 m)
- Draft: 27 ft 9.25 in (8.4646 m)
- Installed power: 2 × Oil fired 450 °F (232 °C) boilers, operating at 220 psi (1,500 kPa); 2,500 hp (1,900 kW)
- Propulsion: 1 × triple-expansion steam engine, (manufactured by Filer and Stowell, Milwaukee, Wisconsin); 1 × screw propeller
- Speed: 11.5 knots (21.3 km/h; 13.2 mph)
- Capacity: 562,608 cubic feet (15,931 m^{3}) (grain); 499,573 cubic feet (14,146 m^{3}) (bale)
- Complement: 38–62 USMM; 21–40 USNAG
- Armament: Varied by ship; Bow-mounted 3-inch (76 mm)/50-caliber gun; Stern-mounted 4-inch (102 mm)/50-caliber gun; 2–8 × single 20-millimeter (0.79 in) Oerlikon anti-aircraft (AA) cannons and/or, 2–8 × 37-millimeter (1.46 in) M1 AA guns

SS Russell Sage was a Liberty ship built in the United States during World War II. She was named after Russell Sage, a member of the U.S. House of Representatives from New York, financier, and railroad executive.

== Construction ==
Russell Sage was laid down on 25 November 1943, under a Maritime Commission (MARCOM) contract, MC hull 1545, by J.A. Jones Construction, Panama City, Florida; she was launched on 5 January 1944.

== History ==
She was allocated to Marine Transport Lines, Inc., on 29 February 1944. On 26 February 1947, she was sold for $544,506 to Caribbean Land & Shipping Corp., for commercial use.

After going through several owners, in 1967, she was named Nikolis M and owned by Miltiades Navegaceon and sailing under a Greek flag when she stranded in Isabela de Sagua. Her wreck is located at 22.924244°N 79.949208°W.

== Bibliography ==
- "Jones Construction, Panama City FL". www.ShipbuildingHistory.com. 13 October 2010.
- "Liberty Ships – World War II".
- Maritime Administration. "Russell Sage". Ship History Database Vessel Status Card. U.S. Department of Transportation, Maritime Administration. Archived from the original on 12 December 2019.
- Davies, James (May 2004). "Specifications (As-Built)" (PDF). p. 23.
- "SS Russell Sage".
- "Historia del Nikolis M".
- "LIBERTY SHIPS - R".
