= Didier Masson =

French aviator

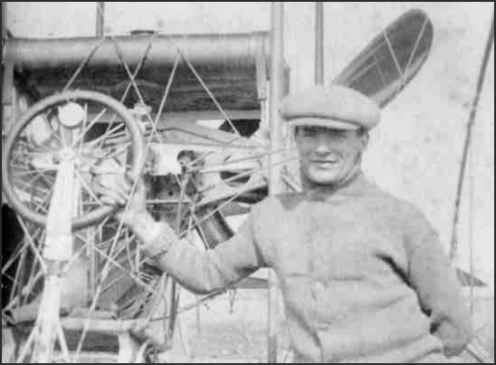
- Born: 23 February 1886; Asnières, France
- Died: 2 June 1950 (aged 64); Merida, Yucatan, Mexico
- Military career
- Allegiance: France/United States
- Branch: Infantry; aviation
- Rank: Adjutant
- Units: 129eme Regiment d'Infanterie, 36eme Regiment d'Infanterie, Escadrille 18, Escadrille 16, Lafayette Escadrille

Didier Masson (23 February 1886 – 2 June 1950) was a pioneering French aviator. He was born in Asnières, France. He died and was buried in Mérida, Yucatan, Mexico. Among his adventures was his life as a pioneering barnstormer, being the second flier in history to bomb a surface warship, as well as combat service in the Lafayette Escadrille with Edwin C. Parsons and Charles Nungesser. In one of the more unusual aerial victories of history, Masson shot down an enemy plane after his own plane's motor quit running. Later in life, he was a manager for pioneer Pan American World Airways, as well as a French consular officer.

== Early life and flying career ==
Didier Masson apprenticed as a jeweler for a short while in 1903 before joining the French army. He served in the 129e Regiment d'Infanterie from 1904 to 1906. After his enlistment ended, he worked for a magneto manufacturer for some years. In 1909, he hired on as a mechanic with Louis Paulhan. Masson claimed to have soloed in 1909 while still in his native country.

== Pioneering barnstormer ==
When Paulhan made a barnstorming tour of the United States in 1910, Masson went with him. The two of them were advertised as appearing at an air meet in Boston on 19 August 1910. At Garden City, New York, Masson successfully test-hopped a biplane built by aviation pioneer E. Lilian Todd in the latter part of 1910. With Paulhan's help, Masson continued to accumulate both solo and dual flight time even though too poor to own his own airplane.

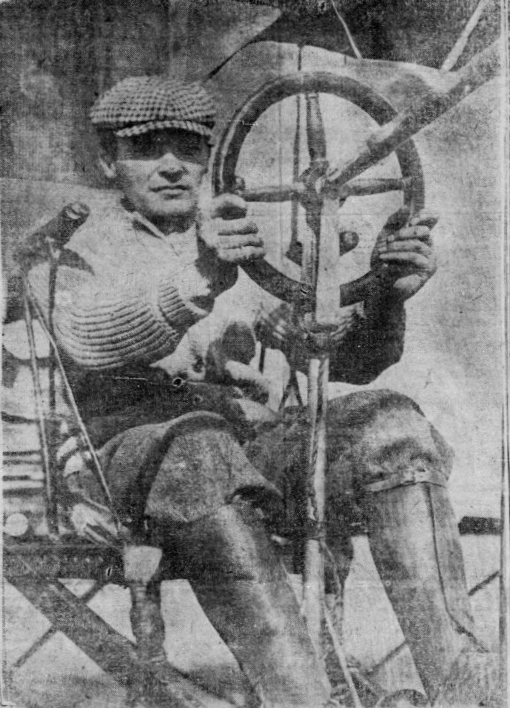
Masson in Pegasus in January 1911

In January 1911, he set out to simultaneously be the first aviator to deliver newspapers by air and to set a world's nonstop distance record in the process. The projected hour and 45-minute flight was planned to carry the Los Angeles Times to San Bernardino, with an en route flyover of Pomona. On 7 January 1911, Masson took off from Los Angeles in the aircraft Pegasus at 0700 hours. After a navigational error of 180 degrees, high winds, and an eventful forced landing, he finally arrived at San Bernardino at 1240; his actual flight time was about 80 minutes. Also in January 1911, Masson won a prize for amateur pilots at Tanforan Racetrack in San Francisco, California.

He continued to fly in California, including a flight over Santa Barbara and an exhibition at Watsonville for May Day. He then relocated to Hawaii.

On 3 June, Masson arrived in Honolulu accompanied by Clarence H. Walker and the latter's bride and Curtiss biplane. Walker staged an exhibition on 11 June that lost money for its promoter, although the pilot received his contracted fee of $1,250. On 16 June, Masson's two monoplanes arrived on the ship Sierra. At 0611 hours, 18 June 1911, Masson took off on the first of ten promised flights, from Leilehua to Kapiolani Park. As he had promised, he flew over Schofield Barracks to let the army officers see him. The return flight from Kapiolani Park at 1330 hours did not go smoothly. Even after servicing, Masson's new and untested plane did not depart, angering a crowd of spectators. Invidious comparison to an earlier barnstormer, J. C. "Bud" Mars, was made; however, Masson was saved from the perturbed mob by local police and soldiers. Four days later, the French pilot crashed that same plane from 100 feet altitude, destroying the plane but sparing him injury.

In October 1911, Masson wowed Canadians in Alberta with his exhibition of flying despite a paucity of aviation gasoline. After several foiled attempts, on 20 October, he finally succeeded in flying over Victoria Park, and after buzzing several grazing horses to frighten them from a field, landed to greet a crowd of spectators. Towards the end of October, Masson planned a Canadian record distance flight following the railroad from Edmonton to Calgary. A special train full of paying spectators had paid $20 each to accompany Masson's epic flight. After several days of cold windy snowy weather, Masson took off, only to have his fuel tank break its mountings and drop on his head. The dazed aviator managed to land safely.

On 18 and 19 May 1912, Masson appeared at the fairgrounds at Lyons, Iowa, as a member of the Ivan Gates flying circus.

By January 1913, he could qualify for Aero Club of America Certificate No. 202 at the Glenn L. Martin Flying School.

== Mercenary ==
Masson was working as an instructor for Martin in California when he was contracted by an agent of [gob of the state of sonora Ignacio pesqueira Gallegos and formal gob representative. to become a mercenary soldier. Masson hired on with the Mexican revolutionary leader for $5,000 as an airplane purchase fee, an allotment of $750 for equipment costs, $300 per month salary, $50 per flight for sorties flown in Mexico, and at least $250 for every bombing sortie flown. Masson flew a pusher airplane bought from Glenn Martin in 1912 and smuggled into Mexico through Arizona. The armed smugglers who forced their way into Mexico at the Nogales crossing included Masson and his mechanic, as well as the promote of Sonora Air force Eduardo Hay . officials Camberos oficial Piña and the brothers Manuel Bauche Alcalde and Joaquín Bauche Alcalde.

The name of the aeroplane was Sonora. It could carry two people, or one person and 150 lb (68 kg) of bombs. After a reconnaissance flight by Masson over Guaymas Harbor, he and Bauche used the aircraft to attack Federalist gunboats for the first aerial bombing of a surface ship. On 10 May 1913, Masson and Bauche overflew at least five Mexican gunboats and dropping four improvised pipe bombs containing 15 kg (33 lb) of explosives. They missed, but the gunboats, seeing themselves as defenseless, steamed out of Guaymas Harbor to safety; indeed, some crew members leaped overboard in panic caused by the explosions. Masson also flew an unknown number of follow-up bombing missions.

Masson's Mexican adventure came to an end when Masson quit flying for the Mexican Revolutionists on 5 August, claiming he had not been paid in a month, and that he had reservations about bombing cities. Masson returned to his newly adopted United States.

== World War I service ==
On 8 September 1914, Masson re-enlisted in his old unit. After being transferred to the 36eme Regiment d'Infanterie for a short while, Masson began military pilot's training at Pau. He earned his Military Pilot's Brevet on a Caudron on 10 May 1915. He was then assigned to Escadrille 18, which was operating Caudrons. In September 1915, he received additional training, learning to fly Nieuports. He was then forwarded to a Nieuport squadron, Escadrille 16, in April 1916, and passed through to start instructing at Cazeau on the 16th. He was in this assignment only two months, checking into the famed Lafayette Escadrille, Escadrille N124, on 16 June 1916. Though he never became an ace, Masson did manage the remarkable feat of having his Nieuport 17's engine cut out while in a dogfight and still downing his German opponent, gliding to safety near the French front lines afterwards. His hasty departure from the wrecked airplane saved him from the German artillery fire that was rained down upon it. By the time Masson departed N124, he was an Adjutant.

== Post World War I ==
Masson returned to Mexico and married. He worked as an airport manager for Pan American in Central America. He also served as a French consular officer until the German invasion of France in 1940.

== Death ==
Didier Masson died in Mérida, Yucatan, Mexico in June 1950.

== See also ==
- List of firsts in aviation
