= Margaret Olivia Slocum Sage =

American philanthropist (1828–1918)

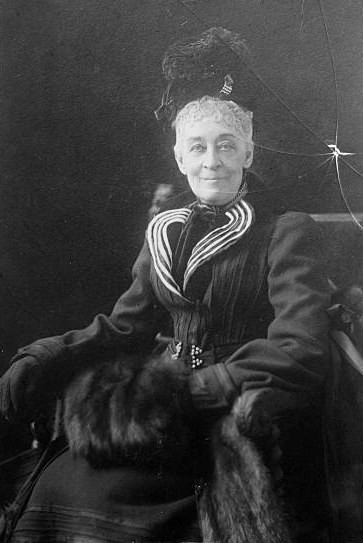
- Sage in 1910
- Born: Margaret Olivia Slocum; September 8, 1828; Syracuse, New York, U.S.
- Died: November 4, 1918 (aged 90); New York City, New York, U.S.
- Education: Troy Female Seminary
- Known for: Founding Russell Sage College
- Spouse: Russell Sage (m. 1869; died 1906)
- Parent(s): Joseph Slocum; Margaret Pierson Jermain
- Relatives: John Jermain (grandfather)

Margaret Olivia Slocum Sage, known as Olivia Sage (September 8, 1828 – November 4, 1918), was an American philanthropist known for her contributions to education and progressive causes. In 1869 she became the second wife of industrialist Russell Sage. At his death in 1906, she inherited a fortune estimated at more than $63,000,000, to be used at her discretion.

A former teacher, Sage strongly supported education, both with program and building grants to Syracuse and other universities. She established the Russell Sage Foundation in 1907 and founded Russell Sage College in 1916, as well as endowing programs for women.

She was a close personal friend and mentor of Helen Miller Gould Shepard, another prominent philanthropist of the time.

== Early life and education ==
Margaret Olivia Slocum, known as Olivia, was born in Syracuse, New York, to Margaret Pierson (née Jermain) and Joseph Slocum. After the Panic of 1837 and the decline of canal traffic following construction of railroads across the state, her father's businesses and warehouses began to fail. Despite her father's financial struggles, Olivia was educated in private schools and graduated in 1847 from the Troy Female Seminary (later called the Emma Willard School, a preparatory school).

== Career ==
Olivia Slocum supported herself by teaching for 20 years in Syracuse, New York, where she lived with her parents, and in Philadelphia. Her father continued to struggle and in 1857, fatally ill with tuberculosis, sold their family home in Syracuse. Olivia and her mother had to move in with relatives.

During the Civil War, Olivia Slocum moved to Philadelphia, where she worked as a governess for a wealthy family. She also volunteered in a military hospital.

== Marriage and family ==
In 1869, at age 41, Olivia Slocum married 53-year old Russell Sage, a widower, financier and railroad executive. He was a cousin of Colonel Ira Yale Sage of the Yale family. They had no children. She became involved in activities defined by her role as his wife.

In 1906, Sage died and left his entire fortune of about $70 million to Olivia, with no stipulations on how she may use it.

== Philanthropy ==
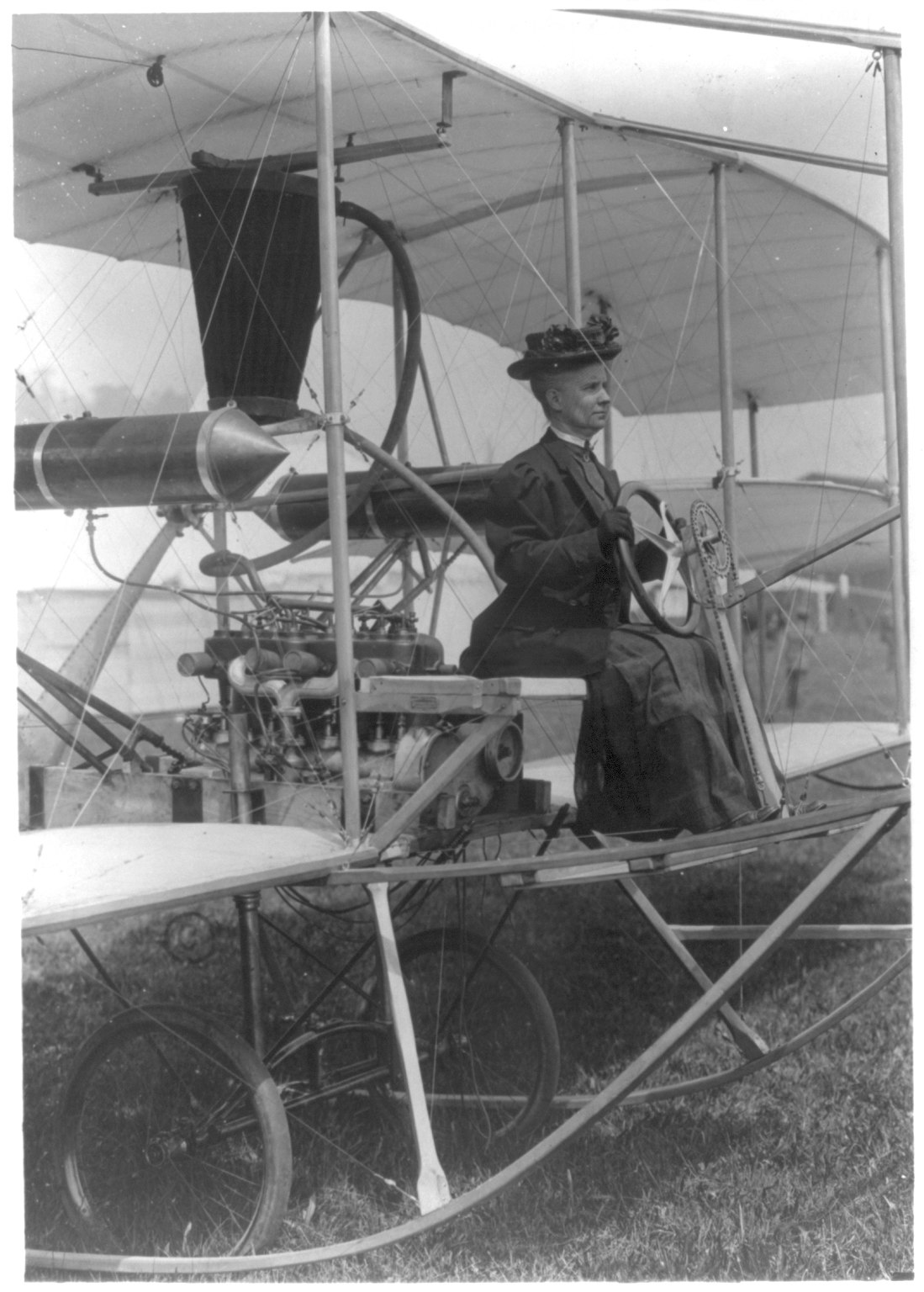
Miss Todd in cockpit of her plane

Sage's philosophy was encapsulated in her article, "Opportunities and Responsibilities of Leisured Women", including "helping the unfortunate by providing them with a good environment, opportunity for self-support and individual responsibility, and protection from the unscrupulous." Mrs. Sage donated Constitution Island to the federal government as an addition to West Point.

In 1905, Olivia Sage told Syracuse University that she would purchase Yates Castle and its surrounding property to house a teachers' college. This independent project demonstrated her attachment to Syracuse, her identification as a teacher, and her commitment to women's education. In 1909, she donated $50,000 to Syracuse on her birthday.

Sage became a patron of E. Lilian Todd (the first woman in the world to design airplanes) after seeing Todd's first airplane design at an exhibition at Madison Square Gardens in 1906. From 1912 Todd, a highly skilled secretary, dealt with Sage's correspondence on a daily basis, working in an office at the Sage house on Fifth Avenue. She came to have some influence on her employer's philanthropic decisions.

In 1915, Mrs. Russell Sage (as she is referred to in records) purchased the National Training School in Durham, North Carolina from Thomas A. Gorman. Gorman had previously acquired the school for $25,100. The institution, which is now known as North Carolina Central University, had originally belonged to Dr. James E. Shepard, who lost ownership due to debt. After buying the school from Gorman, Mrs. Sage returned control of the institution to Dr. Shepard and a new board of trustees.

=== Russell Sage Foundation ===
Her greatest single gift was $10,000,000 in 1907 to establish and endow the Russell Sage Foundation. It commissions studies of social issues and recommends solutions.

In 1908 Slocum Sage donated $650,000 to Yale University, enabling the purchase of the Hillhouse property for what was developed as the university's Science Hill. In 1909, Sage donated Holder Hall to Princeton University, named after her Quaker ancestor Christopher Holder. He had been persecuted in colonial Massachusetts for his religion.

=== Cornell University ===
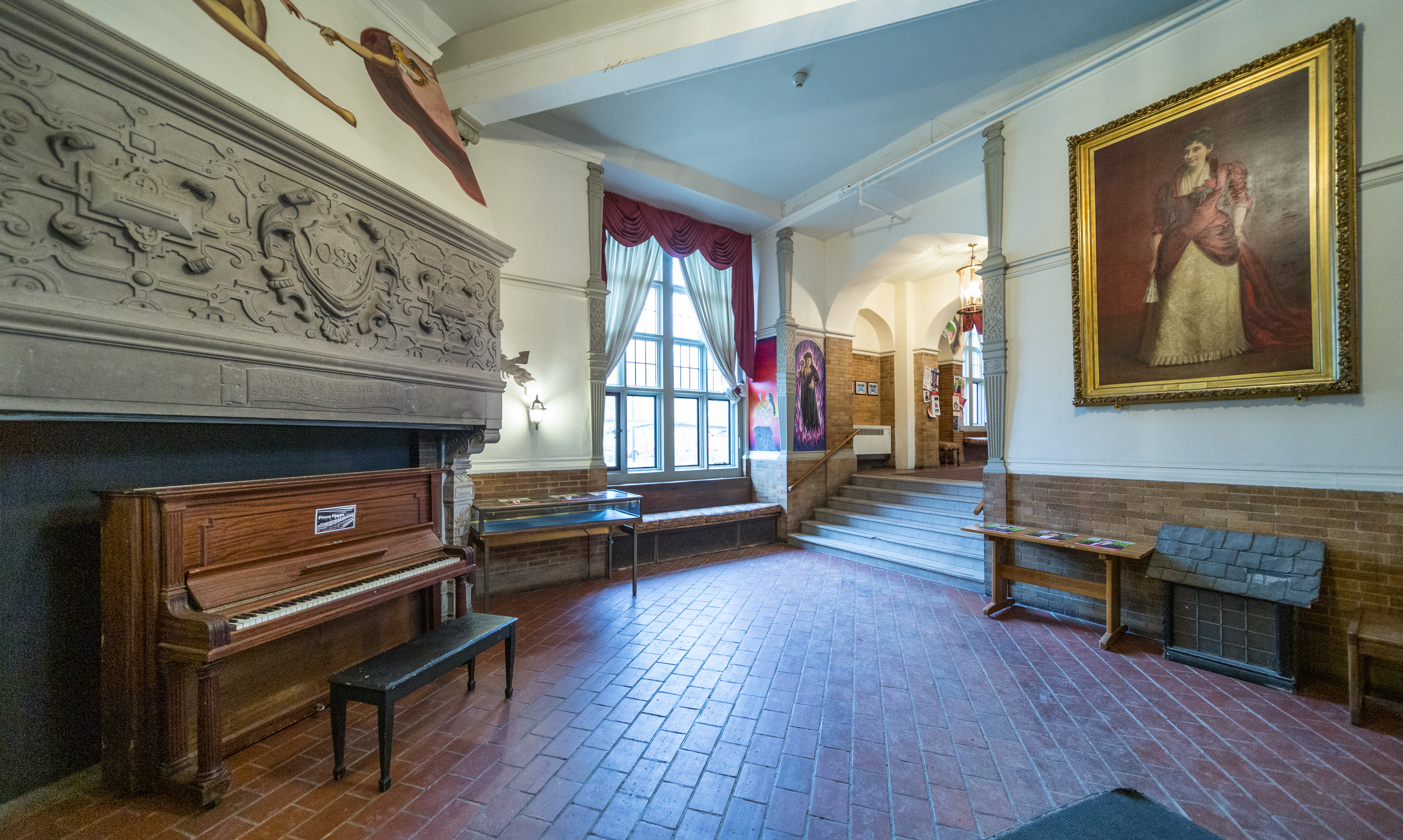
A portrait of Mrs. Sage inside Risley Hall at Cornell

Two years later, Sage gave $300,000 to Cornell University for the construction of a women's dormitory, Risley Hall, named after her mother-in-law. Her promotion of women's education also included funding the construction of the Olivia Josselyn House in 1912, named for her grandmother, at Vassar College, a women's college.

=== Marsh Island ===
In 1912, Sage acquired Marsh Island in the Gulf of Mexico, dedicating it as a refuge for birds and other wildlife. She gifted the island to the state of Louisiana in 1920, which continued the preservation of habitats and wildlife.

=== Russell Sage College ===
In 1916, Sage founded Russell Sage College in Troy, New York as a comprehensive college for women. The college is located within what has since been designated as the historic district of Troy, an area that is listed on the National Register of Historic Places. RSC offers liberal arts and professional degree programs.

=== Pierson Middle-High School ===
Financing to build Pierson Middle-High School was gifted by Sage. It was named for her maternal ancestor Abraham Pierson, one of the early European settlers of Long Island. The school was completed in 1908 at the cost of $102,000.

=== Sag Harbor ===
Olivia Slocum Sage regularly spent her summers at a house in Sag Harbor, New York, a former whaling and fishing village on eastern Long Island. She organized the effort to build a library in the village, and donated most of the funds. She named the library in honor of her grandfather Major John Jermain, who fought in the American Revolution. The library was designed by Augustus N. Allen; she presented it in 1910 as a gift to the people of the village. The land cost $10,000, and was directly across from Sage's summer home on Main Street.

Olivia Sage's summer residence for many years in the village was later adapted for use as the town's Sag Harbor Whaling Museum. In 2017, in honor of the 100th anniversary of women receiving the right to vote in New York State, the William G. Pomeroy Foundation gained approval for installation of a historic roadside marker outside Sage's former Sag Harbor home to acknowledge her contributions to the suffragist movement.

=== Estate ===
The historian Ruth Crocker has studied how Sage provided in her will for distribution of more wealth: her legacy had fifty-two equal parts. Nineteen named educational institutions received one part, or about $800,000 each. She made larger bequests to the following of $1.6 million each: the Emma Willard School, the Woman's Hospital, the Children's Aid Society, the Charity Organization Society, the Metropolitan Museum of Art, the American Museum of Natural History, and Syracuse University. She also provided large donations in her will to a variety of churches, missions, and other religious causes.

By her bequest, Sage donated $2,750,000 posthumously for the development of the Russell Sage Foundation Homes in 1919, a suburban community at Forest Hills Gardens, Queens. In addition she gave extensively to the Rensselaer Polytechnic Institute (RPI) and the Emma Willard School, both in Troy. These contributions included funds donated by Sage that supported major improvements on Rensselaer Polytechnic Institute's campus: construction of the Russell Sage Dining Hall in 1916, named after Sage's nephew who graduated in 1859; and $1,000,000 for the development of Russell Sage Laboratory. This was the base of Rensselaer's Department of Electrical and Mechanical Engineering.

Sage also contributed to the National Training School in Durham, North Carolina (now North Carolina Central University), founded by James E. Shepard for black teachers and affiliated with the Chautauqua movement. Up to 1915, the sum total of Sage's gifts surpassed $23,000,000.
