= Campbell Apartment =

Cocktail bar in New York City

Coordinates: 40°45′9.26″N 73°58′40.13″W

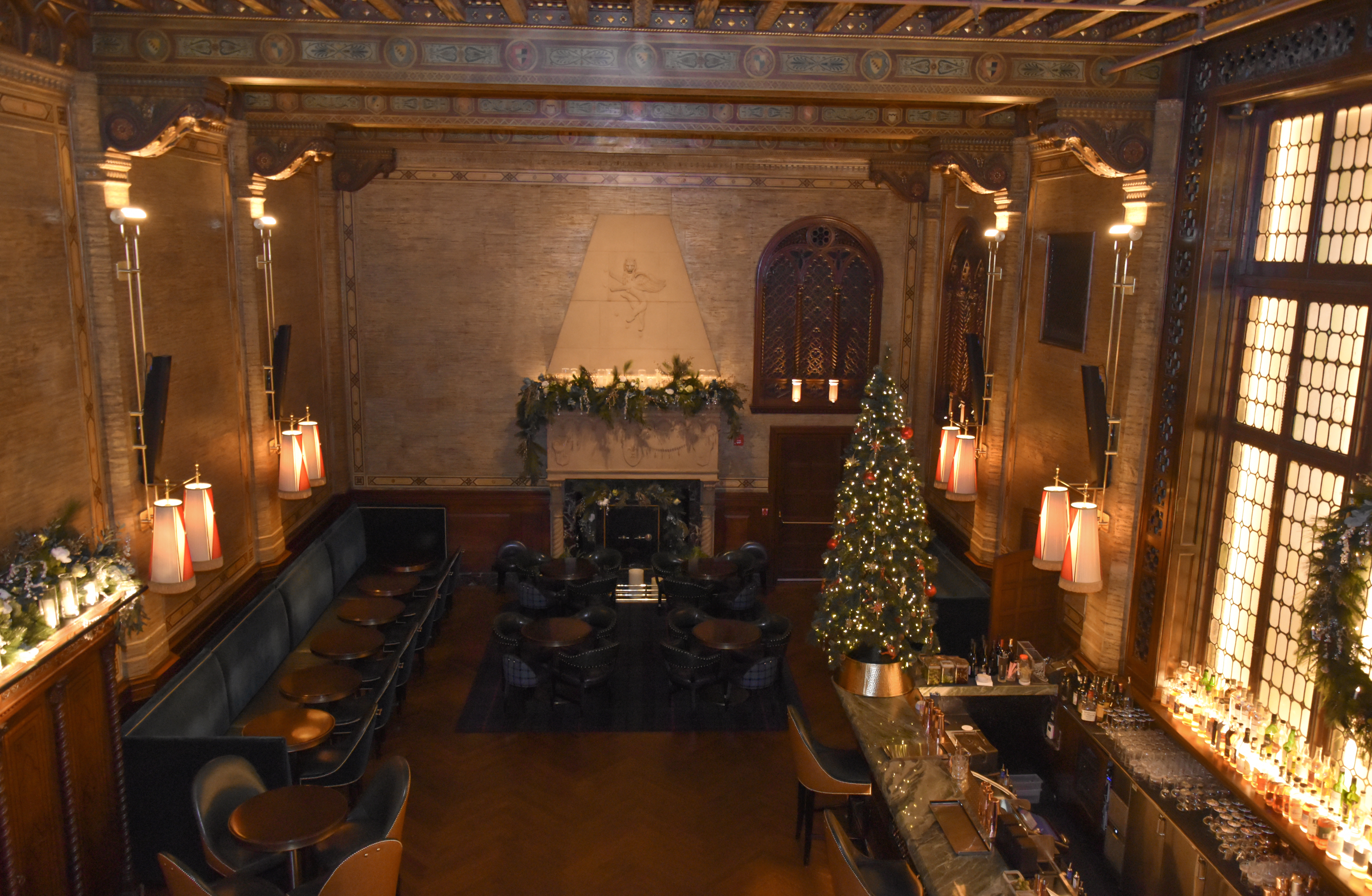
The Campbell Bar

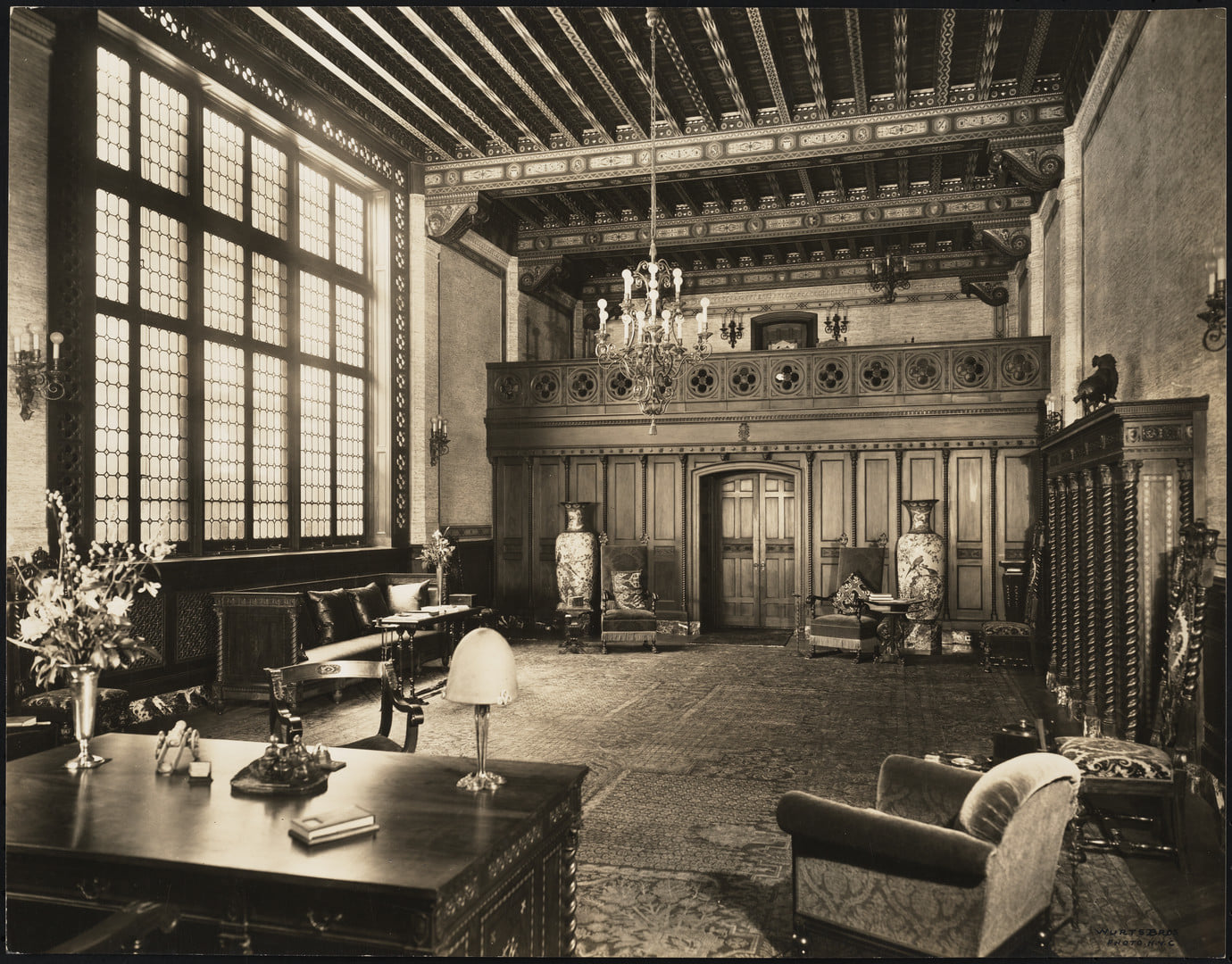
The space as John Campbell's office, c. 1926

The Campbell is a bar and cocktail lounge in Grand Central Terminal in Midtown Manhattan, New York City. The space, long known as the Campbell Apartment, was once the office of American financier John W. Campbell, a member of the New York Central Railroad's board of directors. It was later used as office space, as a studio by CBS and as a jail by Metro-North Railroad. Renovations in 1999 and 2007 restored the space to its original opulence at a total cost of nearly $2 million. Temporarily closed in 2016, the bar was reopened the following year under new management.

Located in the southwestern corner of the Grand Central Terminal building—above the northeastern corner of 42nd Street and Vanderbilt Avenue—the space was once reached by a staircase from the terminal's balcony level. Entry now is from the street.

== History ==
The space was first leased in 1923 by John W. Campbell from William Kissam Vanderbilt II, whose family built the terminal. The 3,500-square-foot (330 m^{2}) space was a single room 60 feet (18 m) long by 30 feet (9.1 m) wide with a 25-foot (7.6 m) ceiling and an enormous faux fireplace in which Campbell kept a steel safe. At that time, it was the largest ground-floor space in Manhattan. Campbell commissioned Augustus N. Allen, an architect known for designing estates on Long Island and town houses in Manhattan, to build an opulent office, transforming the room into a 13th-century Florentine palace with a hand-painted plaster of paris ceiling, leaded windows, and a mahogany balcony with a quatrefoil design. The Persian carpet that took up the entire floor was said to have cost $300,000, or roughly $3.5 million today. Campbell added a piano and pipe organ, and at night turned his office into a reception hall, entertaining 50 or 60 friends who came to hear famous musicians play private recitals.

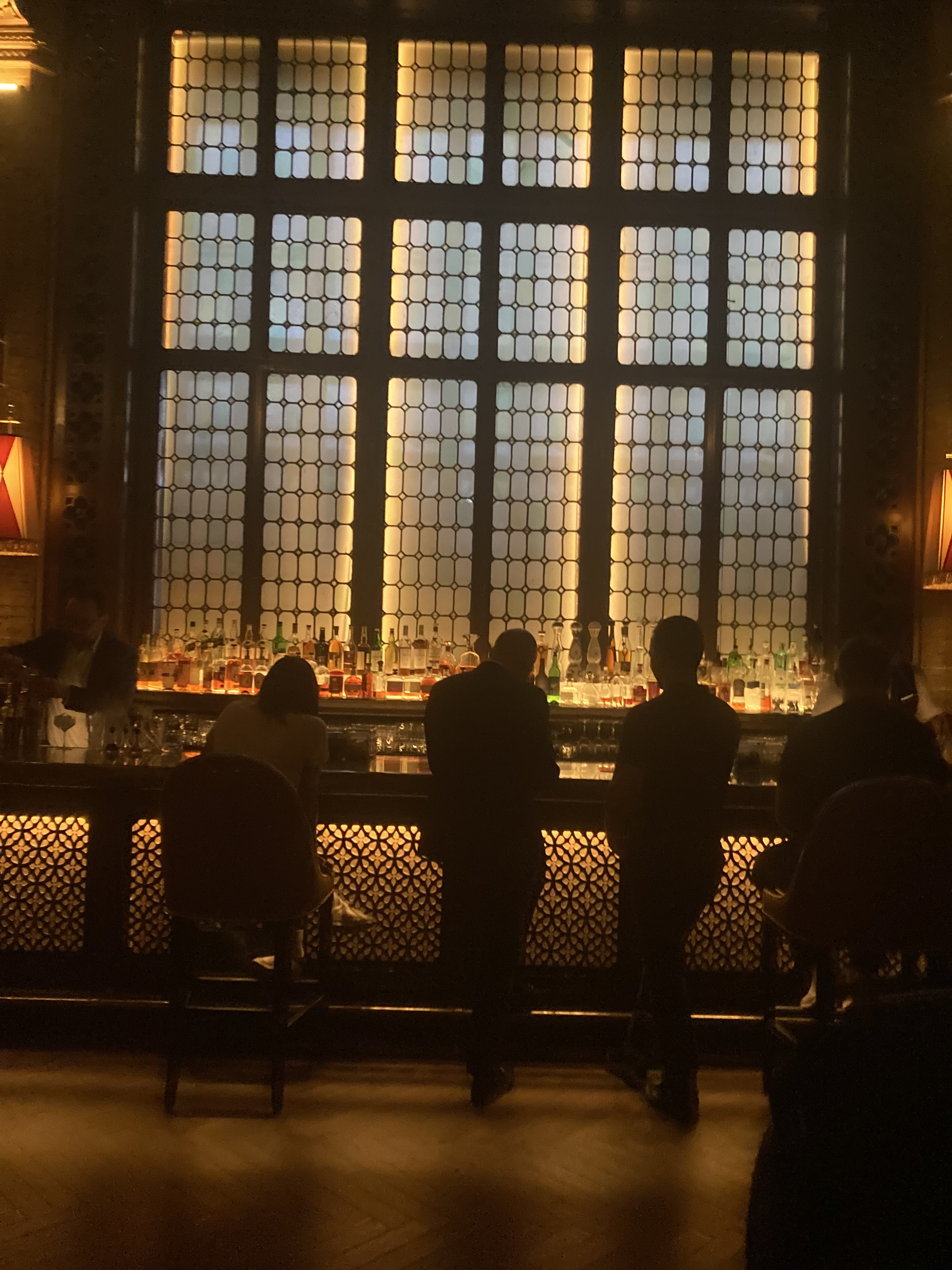
View of the modern bar

After Campbell's death in 1957, the rug and other furnishings disappeared from his office and the space eventually became a signalman's office and later an MTA Police office, where officers stored guns and other equipment. It also had a small jail, in the area of the present-day bar.

After falling into disrepair, the space was restored and renovated in 1999. The walls and ceiling were brought back to their former glory and the original steel safe, once hidden behind a wall, now sits in the massive fireplace as a reminder of Campbell's wealth. The new bar is done in the same quatrefoil mahogany style as the balcony. The renovation cost an estimated $1.5 million. A 2006 renovation replaced a largely blue palette with a largely red one, including new carpet, bar stools and chairs. To avoid closing for even one night, it took place in less than 12 hours and cost $350,000.

The Campbell Apartment lost its lease in June 2016 after a protracted battle with its landlord and closed its doors at the end of the following month.

In May 2017, the bar reopened as The Campbell.

== Popular culture ==
The Campbell Apartment was seen in the premiere episode, "Return of the Ring" (the Season Five finale), and in the final season episode "Monstrous Ball" (via video at cotillion), of the television series Gossip Girl in 2007. The bar is also mentioned in Nell Zink's novel Doxology.

== Gallery ==
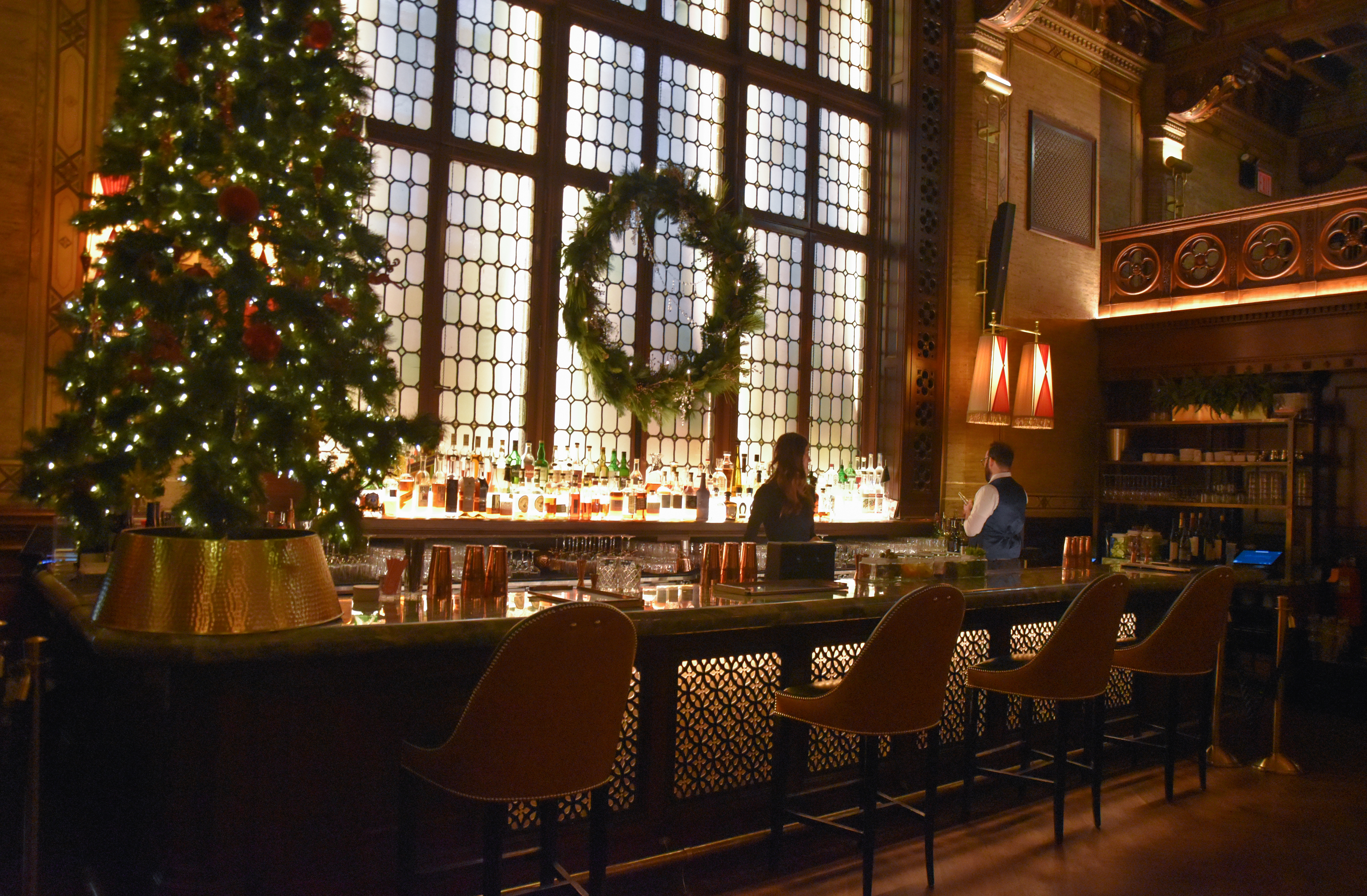
Main bar

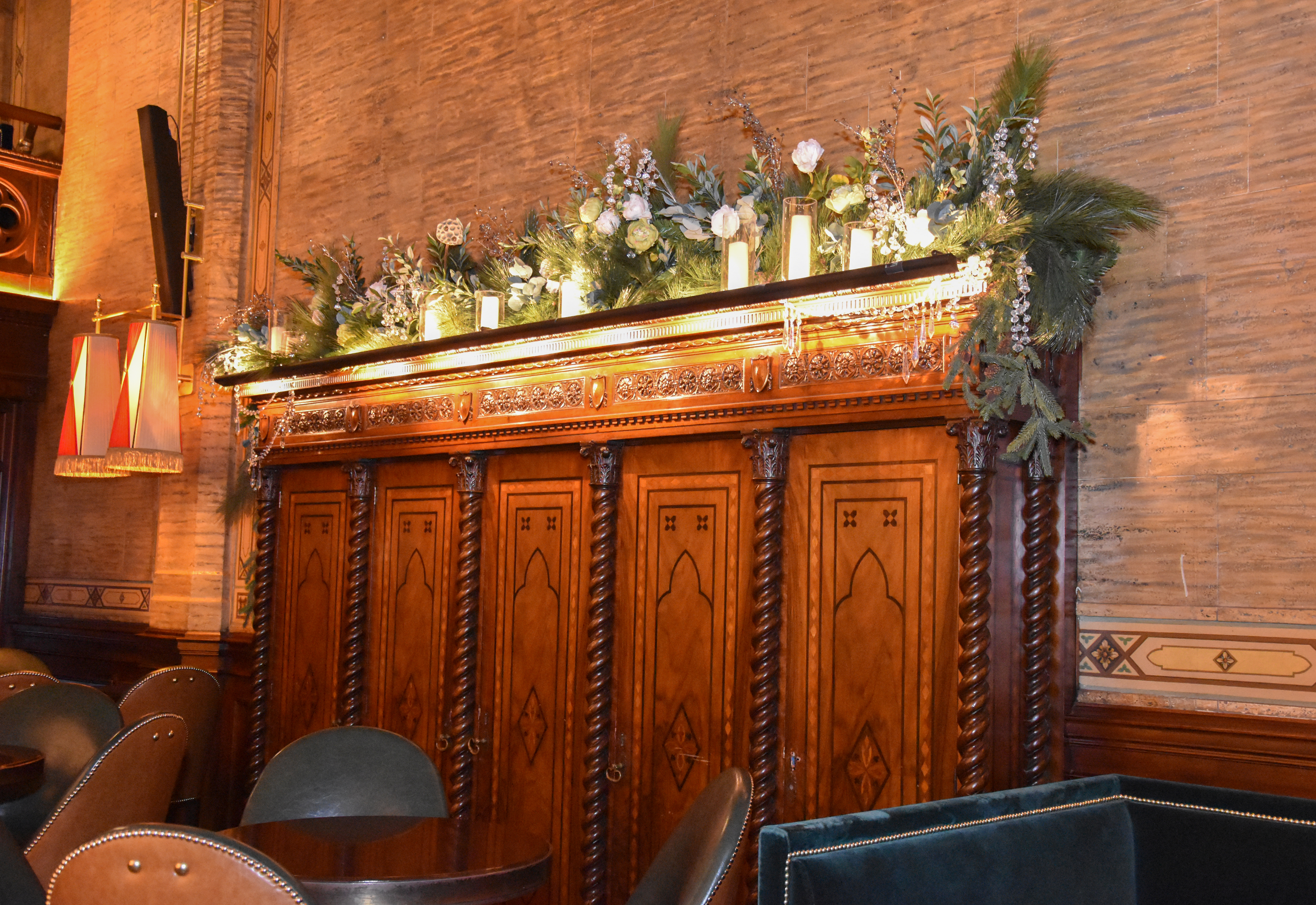
Curio cabinet once used as a gun cabinet

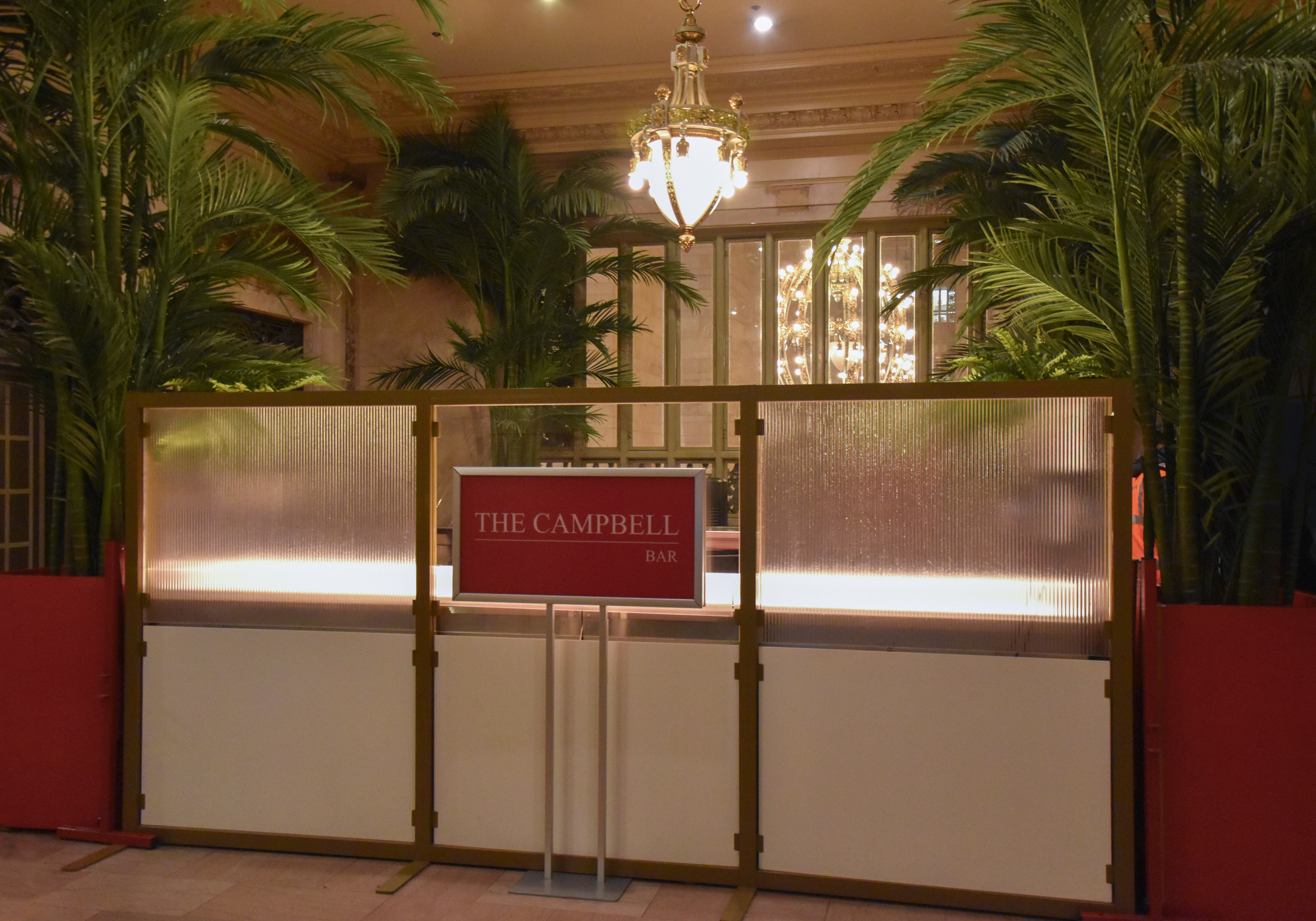
Campbell Palm Court, a satellite bar

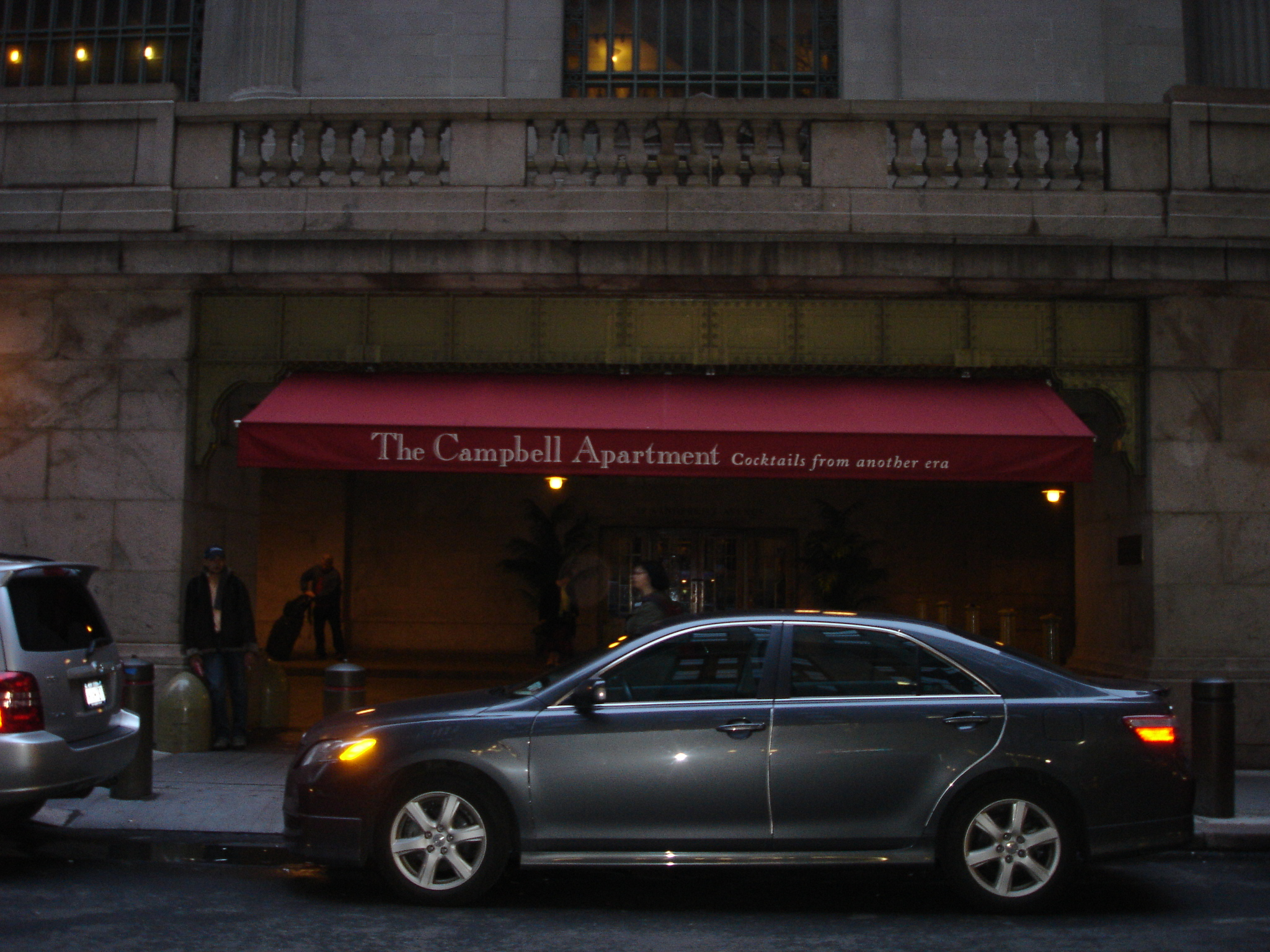
Front entrance, to the street
