= Sag Harbor Whaling Museum =

Coordinates: 40.9977°N 72.2974°W

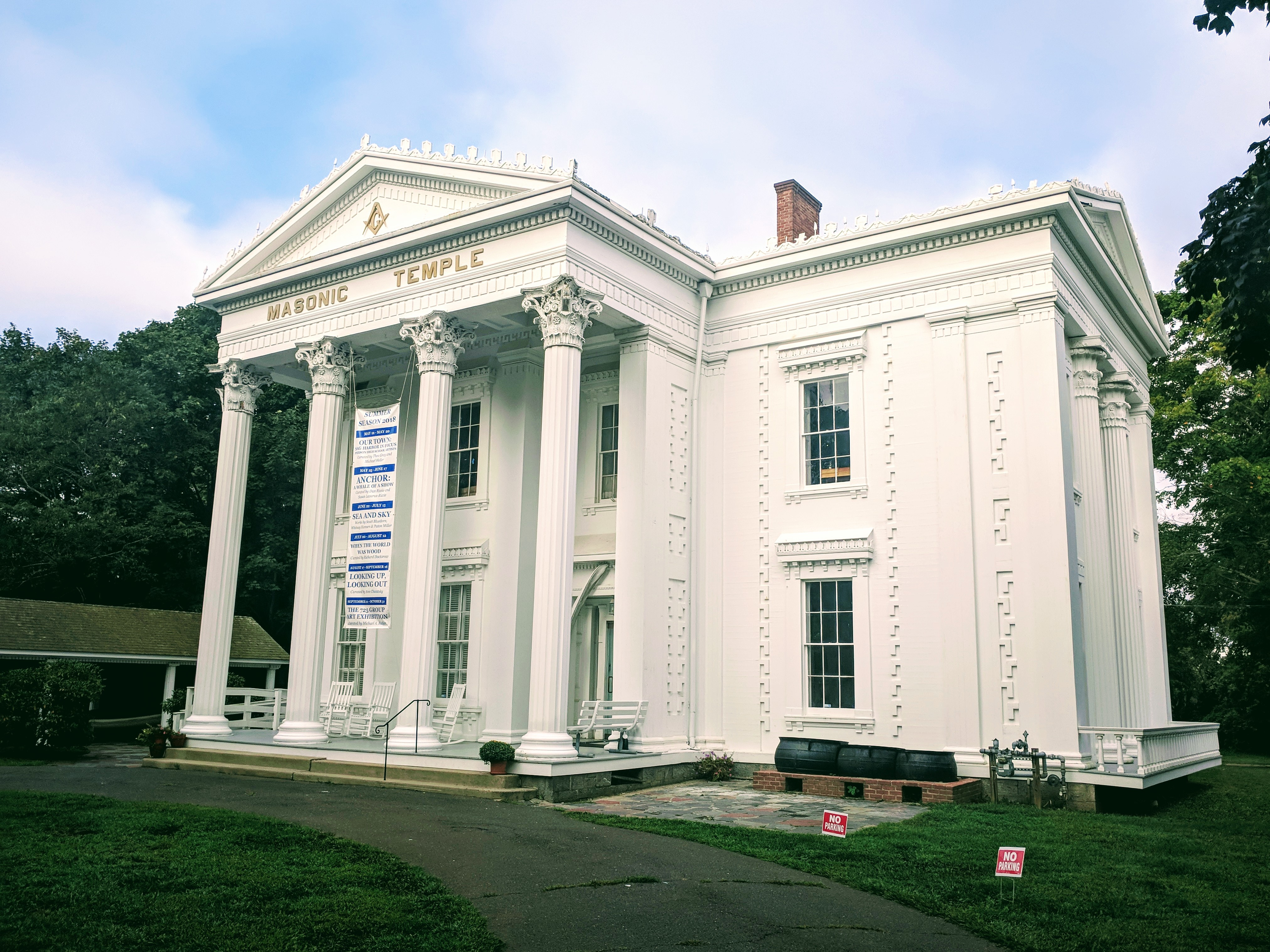
The Sag Harbor Whaling and Historical Museum, which still functions as a Masonic Building

Sag Harbor Whaling and Historical Museum is dedicated to the port town's past within the American whaling industry. It houses the largest collection of whaling equipment in the state of New York.

== Building ==
The building that now houses the museum was built in 1845 by prosperous merchant whaler Benjamin Huntting II at the height of the town's maritime prosperity. Designed by Minard Lafever, the house is an elaborate Greek revival structure with a temple-front portico and fluted Corinthian columns. In an unusual homage to the source of Huntting's fortune, Lafever edged the roof line with a row of decorative crenellation in the form of alternating flensing knives and blubber spades. An enormous pair of whale jawbones frame the front door. Inside, an elegant staircase spirals upward toward a domed skylight. The AIA Architectural Guide calls it "Long Island's finest example of high style Greek revival architecture." The house is "enormous in scale" compared to the usual American Greek Revival houses of the era, and the architect embellished it with some eclectic touches.

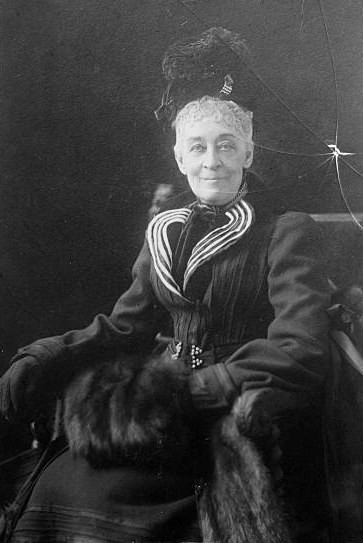
Former owner, philanthropist Mrs. Russell Sage

In 1907 the house was purchased by philanthropist Margaret Olivia Slocum Sage (Mrs. Russell Sage), who lived there in the summers until her death in 1918.

It then became a Masonic Temple in 1920. In 1945 the building was bought by the Whaling Museum; the upper floor is still used by the Freemasons. The building has been open to the public since 1945 as the Sag Harbor Whaling Museum.

== Whaling museum ==
The museum is filled with the equipment of the whaling ships: guns, try pots, flensing knives, blubber spades, figureheads, and a large collection of scrimshaw carvings etched on whale ivory. In the Harpoon Room, harpoons line the walls along with whale vertebrae and shipbuilding tools. Elsewhere are paintings of 19th-century whale hunts. The museum owns the entire building, allowing the Masonic Lodge to meet upstairs.

== See also ==
- List of maritime museums in the United States
