= John W. Campbell (financier) =

American businessman (1880–1957)

- Born: John William Campbell; 1880; Brooklyn, New York, U.S.
- Died: March 15, 1957 (aged 76–77); Manhattan, New York, U.S.
- Occupations: Railroad executive; financier
- Spouse: Rosalind Danhauser Casanave

John William Campbell (1880 – March 15, 1957) was a millionaire American financier and railroad executive. He kept an office at Grand Central Terminal in New York City, which was later converted into a bar called the Campbell Apartment, a gathering spot for commuters and others after work.

== Biography ==
John William Campbell was born in 1880 in Brooklyn, New York, to Wilhelmina (née Van Loon) and John Campbell, an emigrant from Ireland and the treasurer of Alexander Campbell Milk Company and later treasurer of Credit Clearing House, a credit-reference firm specializing in the garment industry. He had two sisters and an older brother. The family lived on Cumberland Street in The Hill, a Brooklyn neighborhood now called Fort Greene.

Campbell did not attend college. He started work at Credit Clearing House as an office boy. At the age of 25, he became an executive and later president and chairman. In 1941, Credit Clearing House merged with Dun & Bradstreet.

Campbell married Rosalind Danhauser "Princess" Casanave, who was once listed in The New York Times as a "patroness" of a "Monte Carlo party and dance" at the Westchester Country Club.

In 1920, at the age of 40, Campbell was appointed to the board of New York Central Railroad, where he crossed paths with William Kissam Vanderbilt II, the railroad scion whose office was in Grand Central Terminal. It is probable that Vanderbilt showed Campbell the space. Campbell became chairman of the board of the Hudson and Manhattan Railroad, keeping the position until his death on March 15, 1957, at Mount Sinai Hospital in Manhattan. He lived in Harrison, New York, for 25 years.

== Office in Grand Central ==
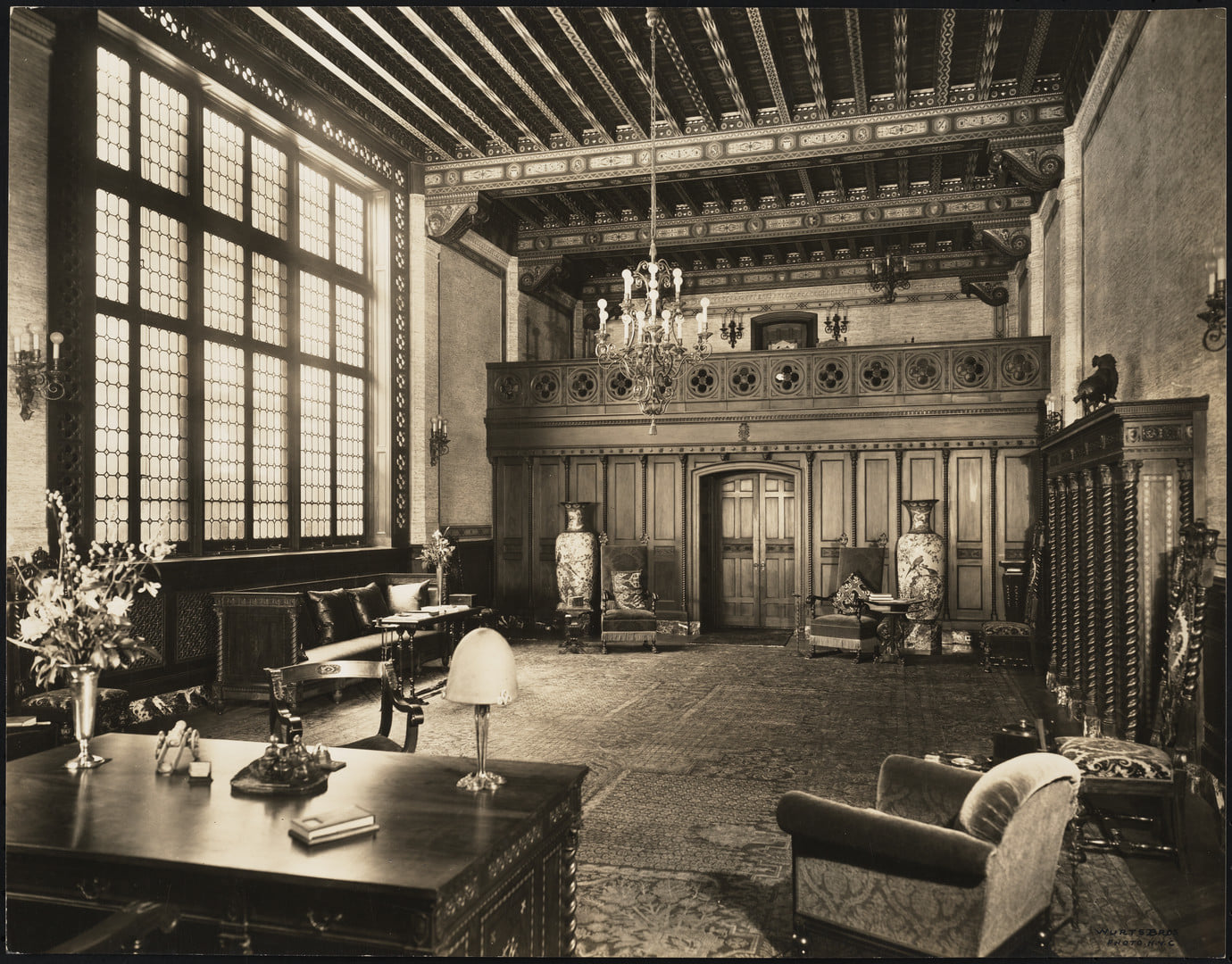
Campbell's office c. 1926

Like other successful tycoons of the day, Campbell demanded a grand office, one convenient to his clients and close to the railroad so he could commute, first from a nearby apartment at 270 Park Avenue, and later, from the Westchester Country Club to the north. To satisfy these needs, he leased 3,500 square feet (330 m^{2}) of space from Grand Central Terminal. It was a single room 60 feet (18 m) long by 30 feet (9.1 m) wide with a 25-foot (7.6 m) ceiling and an enormous fireplace in which he kept a steel safe.

In 1923, Campbell commissioned Augustus N. Allen, an architect known for designing estates on Long Island and townhouses in Manhattan, to build an office in the leased space in Grand Central. He transformed a room into a 13th-century Florentine office with a hand-painted plaster of Paris ceiling and leaded windows. He installed 19th-century Italian chairs and tables, an art collection worth more than $1 million ($18,896,484 today), and a massive desk from which he conducted business. One of the most striking features was a Persian carpet that took up the entire floor and was said to have cost $300,000. Campbell added a piano and pipe organ, and at night turned his office into a reception hall, entertaining 50 or 60 friends who came to hear famous musicians play private recitals.

After Campbell's death in 1957, the rug and other furnishings disappeared from his office and the space eventually became a signalman's office and later a closet at Grand Central, where transit police stored guns and other equipment. It also held a small jail, in the area of the present-day bar. The room was restored in 1999 and turned into a bar, today called The Campbell.
