= Russell Sage =

American financier, politician (1816–1906)

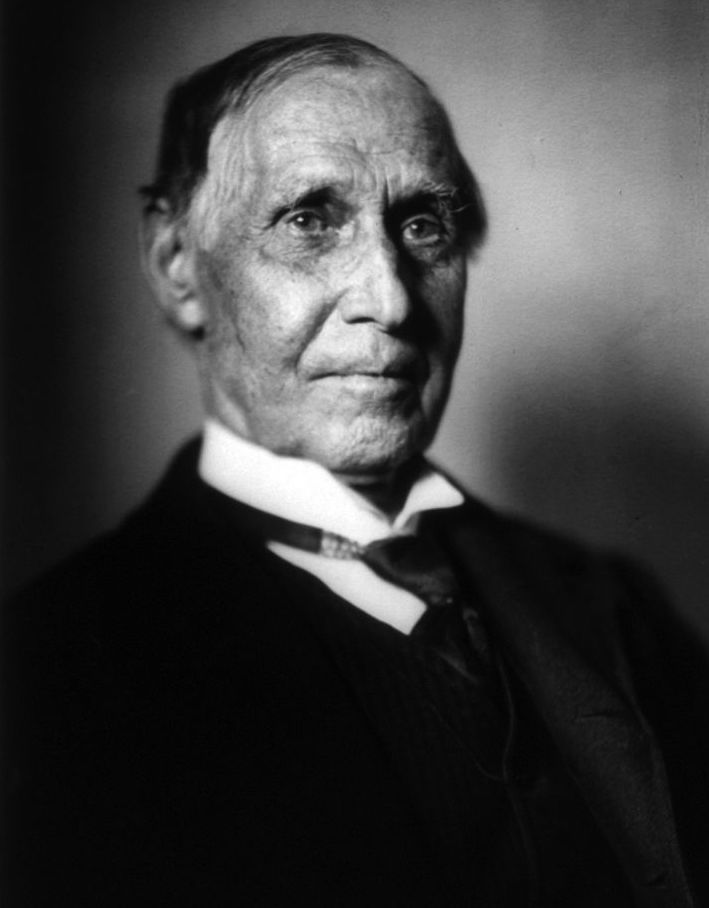
- Russell Sage in 1903

Member of the U.S. House of Representatives from New York's 13th district
- In office March 4, 1853 – March 3, 1857
- Preceded by: John L. Schoolcraft
- Succeeded by: Abram B. Olin

Member of the Troy City Council
- In office 1841–1848

Personal details
- Born: August 4, 1816 Verona, New York, U.S.
- Died: July 22, 1906 (aged 89) New York City, U.S
- Resting place: Oakwood Cemetery, Troy, New York
- Party: Whig
- Spouses: Marie-Henrie Winne (m. 1840; died 1867) Olivia Slocum (m. 1868)
- Profession: Businessman, socialite
- Net worth: US$70 million (1906)
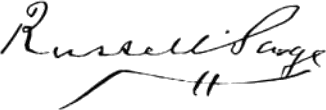
- Signature

Russell Risley Sage (August 4, 1816 – July 22, 1906) was an American financier, railroad executive and Whig politician from New York, who became one of the richest Americans of all time. As a frequent partner of Jay Gould in various transactions, he amassed a fortune. Olivia Slocum Sage, his second wife, inherited his fortune, which was unrestricted for her use. In his name she used the money for philanthropic purposes, endowing a number of buildings and institutions to benefit women's education: she established the Russell Sage Foundation in 1907 and founded the Russell Sage College for women in 1916.

== Early life and family ==
Sage was born at Verona in Oneida County, New York to Elisha Sage Jr. and Prudence Risley. His grandfather Elisha Yale Sr. was a construction contractor, and his uncle, Barzillai Sage, was the grandfather of railroad magnate Col. Ira Yale Sage of the Yale family. Russell Sage's nephew, Earl Chapin, also married to Cecilia A. Yale, sister of Col. John Wesley Yale, and mother of editor Charles Chapin.

Through his granduncles Capt. William Sage and Capt. Nathan Sage, distant cousins included Princess Kay Sage, wife of the Prince of San Faustino, Admiral Francis M. Bunce, Cornell benefactor Henry W. Sage, and Senators Henry M. Sage and Josiah B. Williams.

Princess Kay Sage, member of American royalty, was related by marriage to the Agnelli family, founders of Fiat S.p.A. and owners of Ferrari, with family members including Donna Virginia Bourbon del Monte, Princess Clara von Fürstenberg, Senator Giovanni Agnelli, minister Susanna Agnelli, and Italy's richest man, Gianni Agnelli of Villa Leopolda.

Sage received a public school education and worked as a farmhand until he was 15. He started as an errand boy in his brother Henry's grocery in Troy, New York. He had a part interest in 1837–1839 in a retail grocery in Troy, and in a wholesale store there in 1839–1857.

== Political career ==
In 1841, Sage was elected as alderman in Troy. He was re-elected to this office until 1848, while also serving for seven years as treasurer of Rensselaer County. He was elected to the U.S. House of Representatives as a Whig. He was re-elected in 1854 and served from March 4, 1853, until March 3, 1857. He served on the Ways and Means Committee. Sage was the first person to advocate in Congress for the purchase of George Washington's plantation, Mount Vernon, by the government.

== Financial career ==
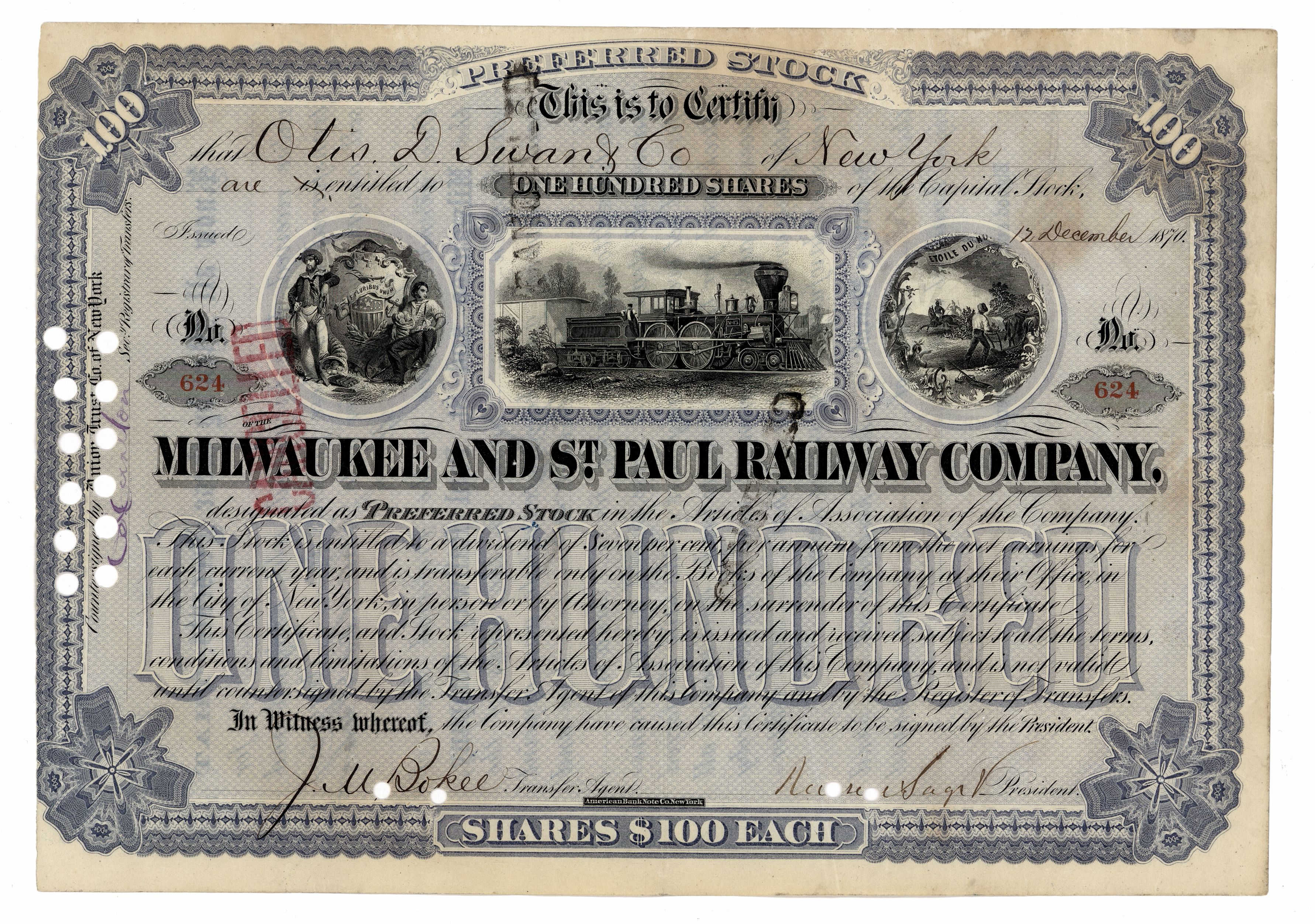
Share of the Milwaukee and St. Paul Railway Company, issued 12. December 1870, signed by Russell Sage

After retiring from politics Sage settled in New York City, where he engaged in the business of selling puts and calls, as well as short-term options known as privileges. He has been credited with developing the market for stock options in the United States and inventing the "spread" and "straddle" option strategies, for which he was dubbed "Old Straddle" and the "Father of Puts and Calls." He used the options to synthesize loans at a higher interest rate than state usury laws allowed, for which he was convicted in 1869 and fined $500, with a suspended jail sentence.

Sage bought a seat on the New York Stock Exchange in 1874, and became known as a financier. At the same time he saw the future of railroads, and secured stocks in western roads, notably the Chicago, Milwaukee and St. Paul Railway. He was president and vice-president for twelve years. By selling such investments, as the smaller roads were bought by major trunk-lines, he became wealthy. In his later years he was closely associated with Jay Gould in the management of the Wabash Railway, St. Louis and Pacific, Missouri Pacific Railroad, Missouri–Kansas–Texas Railroad, Delaware, Lackawanna and Western Railroad, and the St. Louis–San Francisco Railway, for which he was director of the corporations.

He also served as director for the American cable company, the Western Union telegraph company, and the Manhattan consolidated system of elevated railroads in New York City. He was a director of the Union Pacific Railroad, which was part of constructing the transcontinental railroad. Together with other major investors (and railroad pioneers of the nineteenth century), he made a fortune. He was a director and vice-president in the Importers and Traders' National Bank for twenty years, and also a director in the Merchants' Trust Company and in the Fifth Avenue Bank of New York City.

Following the collapse of the Grant & Ward scheme in 1884, Sage faced a run from holders of put options that he had sold. He honored all demands but withdrew from the sale of options soon afterward.

== Assassination attempt ==
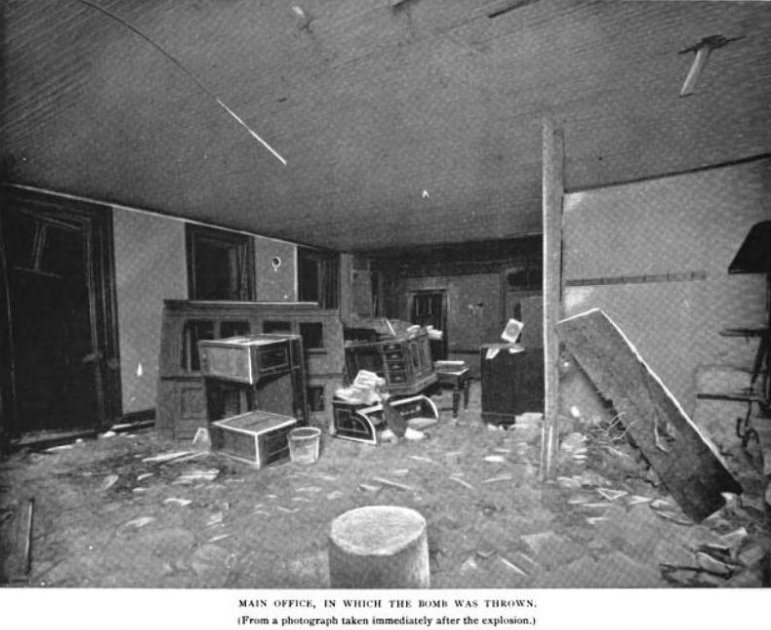
Damage to the interior of the main office after the assassination attempt against Russell Sage

In 1891, Henry L. Norcross entered Sage's office in a six-story 1859 brownstone office building at 71 Broadway in Manhattan, claiming he needed to discuss railroad bonds. Norcross gave Sage a letter demanding $1,200,000, which Sage declined to pay. Norcross was carrying a bag of dynamite, which exploded, killing Norcross, wounding Sage, and severely wounding William R. Laidlaw Jr., a clerk for John Bloodgood and Co. who happened to be in the office. Afterward Laidlaw sued Sage, alleging that he had used him as a shield against Norcross. Disabled for life, Laidlaw aggressively pursued the lawsuits, winning $43,000 in damages after four trials, but a Court of Appeals reversed the award. Sage never paid any settlement and was publicly criticized as a miser because of his great fortune.

== Personal life ==
On January 23, 1840, Sage married Marie-Henrie Winne, who was also known as "Maria Winne". They had no children. She died on May 7, 1867, of stomach cancer. In 1869 at the age of 53, Sage remarried, to Olivia Slocum (1828–1918), who was ten years younger.

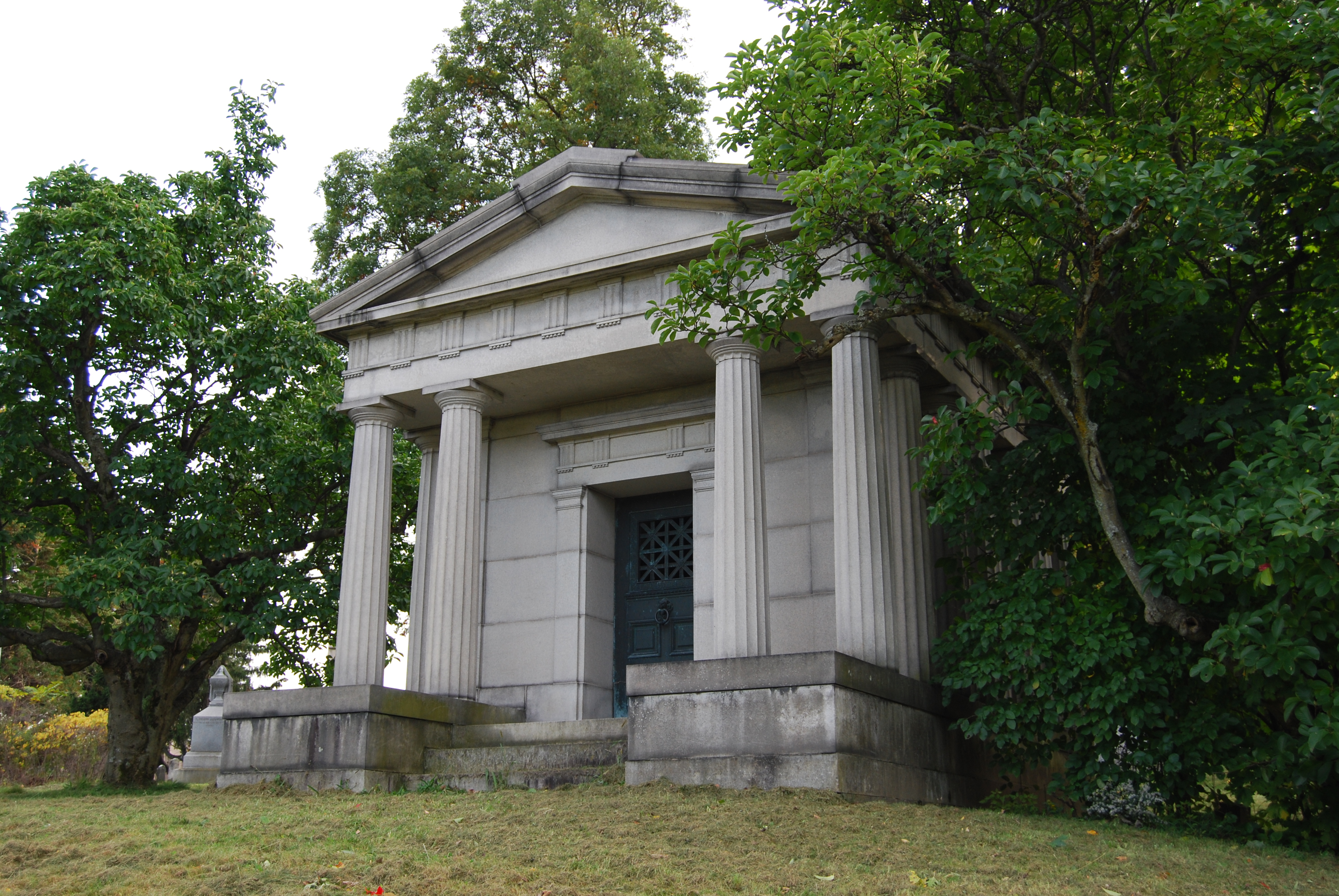
Sage's mausoleum in Oakwood Cemetery

Sage was known to have affairs outside marriage both before and after the death of his first wife. The writer Paul Sarnoff suggested in his biography of Sage that he may have remarried for appearance's sake, and may never have consummated his second marriage. Sage was reported to have had a child by a young chambermaid.

Sage was a member of West Presbyterian Church on West 42nd Street between Fifth and Sixth Avenue, which later merged with Park Presbyterian to form West-Park Presbyterian.

In 1906 Sage died and left his entire fortune of about $70 million (~$1.83 billion in 2024) to his wife, Olivia Slocum Sage. He was buried in a mausoleum in Oakwood Cemetery in Troy, New York. The mausoleum is of a Greek style and is intentionally unnamed. To the left of the memorial is a bench which contains a relief of Medusa on the center of the back, complete with snakes as hair.

== Legacy and honors ==
Olivia Sage devoted a major portion of the money she inherited from her husband to philanthropy, including buildings and other memorials to him. She commissioned Ralph Adams Cram, a leading architect, to design Russell Sage Memorial Church, and for Louis Tiffany to create a large stained glass window as a memorial. Built in 1908, the church was located in Far Rockaway, Queens, where the family had a summer home.

In 1907 she established the Russell Sage Foundation, and in 1916 founded Russell Sage College in Troy. In addition she gave extensively to the Emma Willard School and to Rensselaer Polytechnic Institute (RPI) in Troy, her husband's home town.

In 1917, Russell Sage Dormitory was established at Lawrence University (then Lawrence College) in Appleton, Wisconsin and named in his honor.

During World War II the Liberty ship SS Russell Sage was built in Panama City, Florida, and named in his honor.

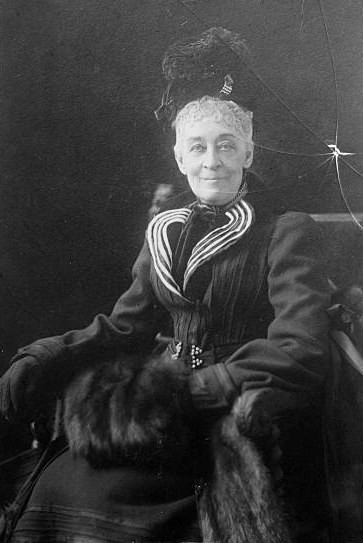
Olivia Slocum Sage in 1910

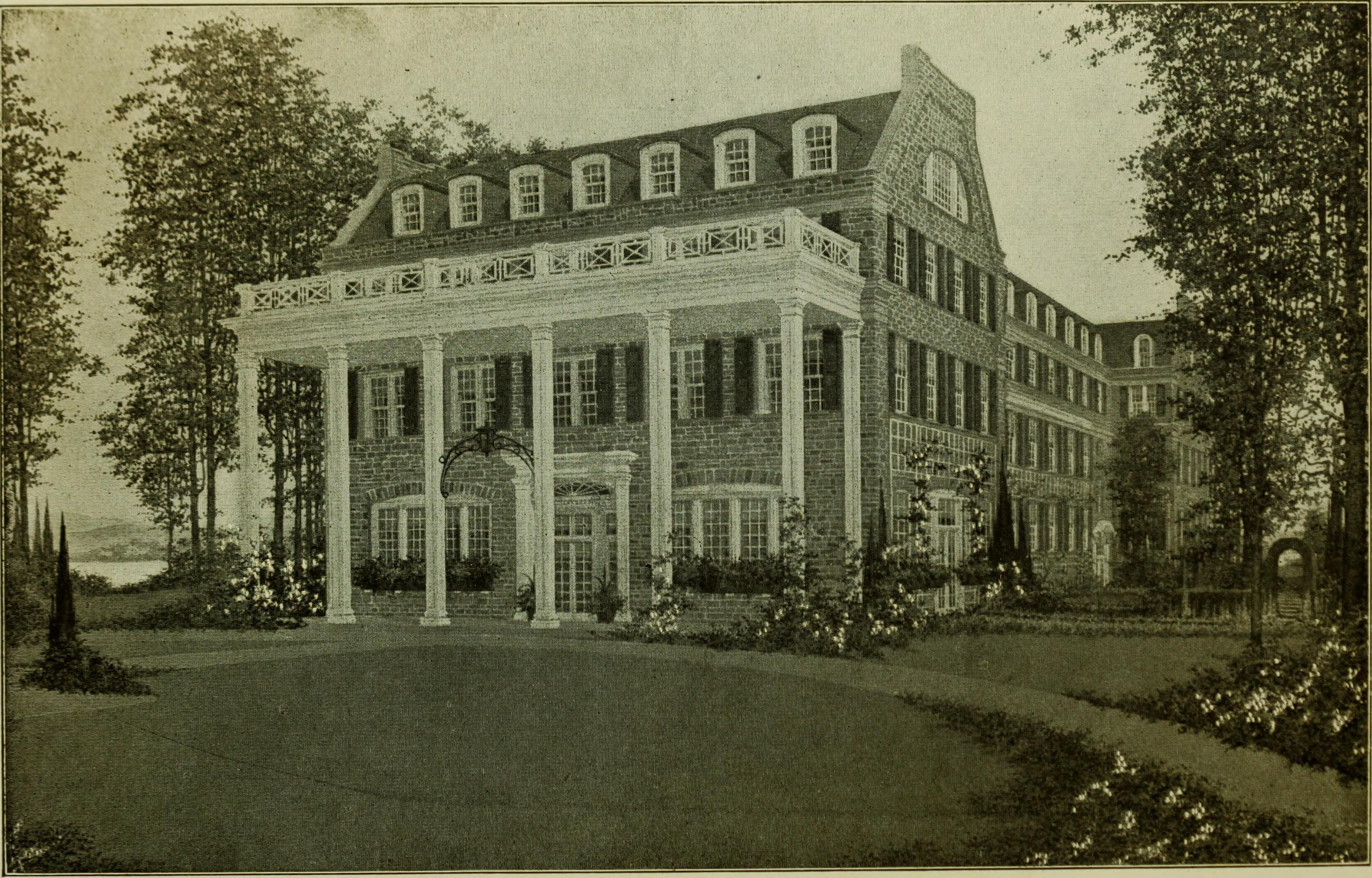
A 1909 drawing of proposed Myra Goodwin Plantz Dormitory, which would later be called Russell Sage Dormitory at Lawrence University.

U.S. House of Representatives
Preceded by John L. Schoolcraft	Member of the U.S. House of Representatives from New York's 13th congressional district March 4, 1853 – March 3, 1857	Succeeded by Abram B. Olin
