= Augustus N. Allen =

American architect

Augustus N. Allen (July 19, 1867 – March 25, 1958) was an architect known for designing buildings on Long Island and in New York City, as well as New Jersey. He also designed the office of American financier and railroad executive John W. Campbell at Grand Central Terminal, which was later converted into a bar called the Campbell Apartment.

== Long Island ==
Allen designed many grand estates on Long Island for wealthy families from New York. He also designed other buildings on the island, including Sag Harbor's library.

=== John Jermain Memorial Library ===
Allen designed the John Jermain Memorial Library in Sag Harbor, built in 1910 with funds donated by Mrs. Russell Sage in memory of her grandfather, Major John Jermain, and presented as a gift to the people of Sag Harbor. The property, located directly across Main Street from Mrs. Sage's then summer home, cost $10,000, at the time the highest price ever paid for a piece of real estate in Sag Harbor. Construction of the building cost $70,000.

Allen designed the library in the Classical revival style. Four stone Doric columns supporting a pediment adorn the front of the 50-foot (15 m) by 50-foot (15 m) brick structure. The trim and base of the building are done in stone. The stone lintels of the windows are designed with the Greek key pattern. Other architectural details include wreaths, torches and egg and dart molding. In the interior, fluted stone columns, and lintels ornamented with medallions form the octagonal third floor reading room. Bronze torches light the entryways and vestibules. A winding marble staircase leads up to this room that is crowned by a brick, copper and stained glass dome rising 60 feet (18 m) above the ground. The dome, constructed by the R. Guastavino Company, is one of the more than 1,000 they built, including those at the library of the University of Virginia in Charlottesville, the Cathedral of St. John the Divine in New York, and the National Museum of Natural History in Washington, D.C.

== New Jersey ==
=== Pleasantdale Chateau ===
Charles W. Nichols of Allied Chemical & Dye Corporation, later AlliedSignal, acquired a number of contiguous farms in 1912 and created a 40-acre (160,000 m^{2}) estate with formal gardens in West Orange, New Jersey. The Nichols family used the property as a summer weekend retreat and occupied a small farmhouse. But after a number of years, the family desired a larger home.

In the 1920s, Nichols set out to build his country estate, preferring the Norman style of architecture from the south of England and the north of France. He hired Allen as his architect and the two toured Europe to seek out Norman style buildings and designed Pleasantdale Chateau. The exterior of the house is of the Norman half-timber and stucco character, while the interior reflects a number of period styles. The entrance has 15th century Spanish tiles on the floor. The chateau was completed in 1933. Pleasantdale Chateau stands today at 757 Eagle Rock Avenue as an example of a French Normandy manor house, and serves as a retreat, catering and conference facility.

== New York City ==
=== Office of John W. Campbell ===
In 1923, Campbell leased 3,500 square feet (330 m^{2}) of space in Grand Central from William Vanderbilt II for his office. It was a single room 60 feet (18 m) long by 30 feet (9.1 m) wide with a 25-foot (7.6 m) ceiling and an enormous fireplace. Campbell commissioned Allen, to design his office, transforming the space into a 13th-century Florentine palace with a hand-painted ceiling and leaded windows. He installed 19th-century Italian chairs and tables, an art collection worth more than $1 million, and a massive desk from which he conducted business.

After Campbell’s death in 1957, the office fell into disrepair. Many years later, in 1999, the space was restored and renovated into a public bar and lounge called the Campbell Apartment. The name is apparently a misnomer, people having assumed that such a grand space was an apartment, not an office. The walls and ceiling were brought back to their former glory at a cost of $1.5 million.

=== 1082 Park Avenue ===
Allen designed this bright, polychromed tile facade in 1925 for a furniture and decoration company that played an unusual part in the development of this section of Park Avenue. The original 1082 Park Avenue was one of a row of eight five-story brick apartment houses covering the entire west side of Park Avenue from 88th to 89th Street. In 1905, Simon Ginsberg, an upholsterer with a shop across the street, bought 1082 Park and relocated to the ground floor.

In 1924, a syndicate developing the co-op apartment house built as 1088 Park Avenue, at the southwest corner of 89th Street, acquired an L-shaped plot surrounding 1082 Park and the corner building, 1080. In 1925, as the new 1088 Park Avenue apartment house was rising, Ginsberg decided on a new look for his building, too. Allen, a veteran rowhouse designer, developed a complicated facade of glazed terra cotta: a ground floor of rusticated blocks, second floor of show windows separated by spiral colonettes, third and fourth floors joined behind double height panels and an attic story of rounded windows under a tiled, projecting roof.

As rebuilt by the upholsterer, 1082 had a band of lettering reading "Ginsberg" at the attic-floor level and another reading "Furniture & Decoration" at the third-floor level. The zoning law of 1916 established this section of Park Avenue as strictly residential, and permitted Ginsberg to rebuild only because the store was already there. By 1935, the Ginsbergs were succeeded as the ground floor tenant by an A&P. The ground floor is now occupied by the Dutch Girl dry cleaning store. The Ginsbergs retained their furniture business upstairs for a while, but by the 1940s the upper floors were used for doctors' and dentists' offices, and they are now apartments.

=== 292 Madison Avenue ===
The original twelve story building at the corner of Madison Avenue and 41st Street was designed by Allen in 1910. It was expanded upwards to 26 stories and to the sides by Ludlow & Peabody in 1923. Today, the building is home to many law firms, as well as the Statue of Liberty-Ellis Island Foundation and the Park Avenue Liquor Shop, which dates back to 1934.

=== Latham Hotel ===
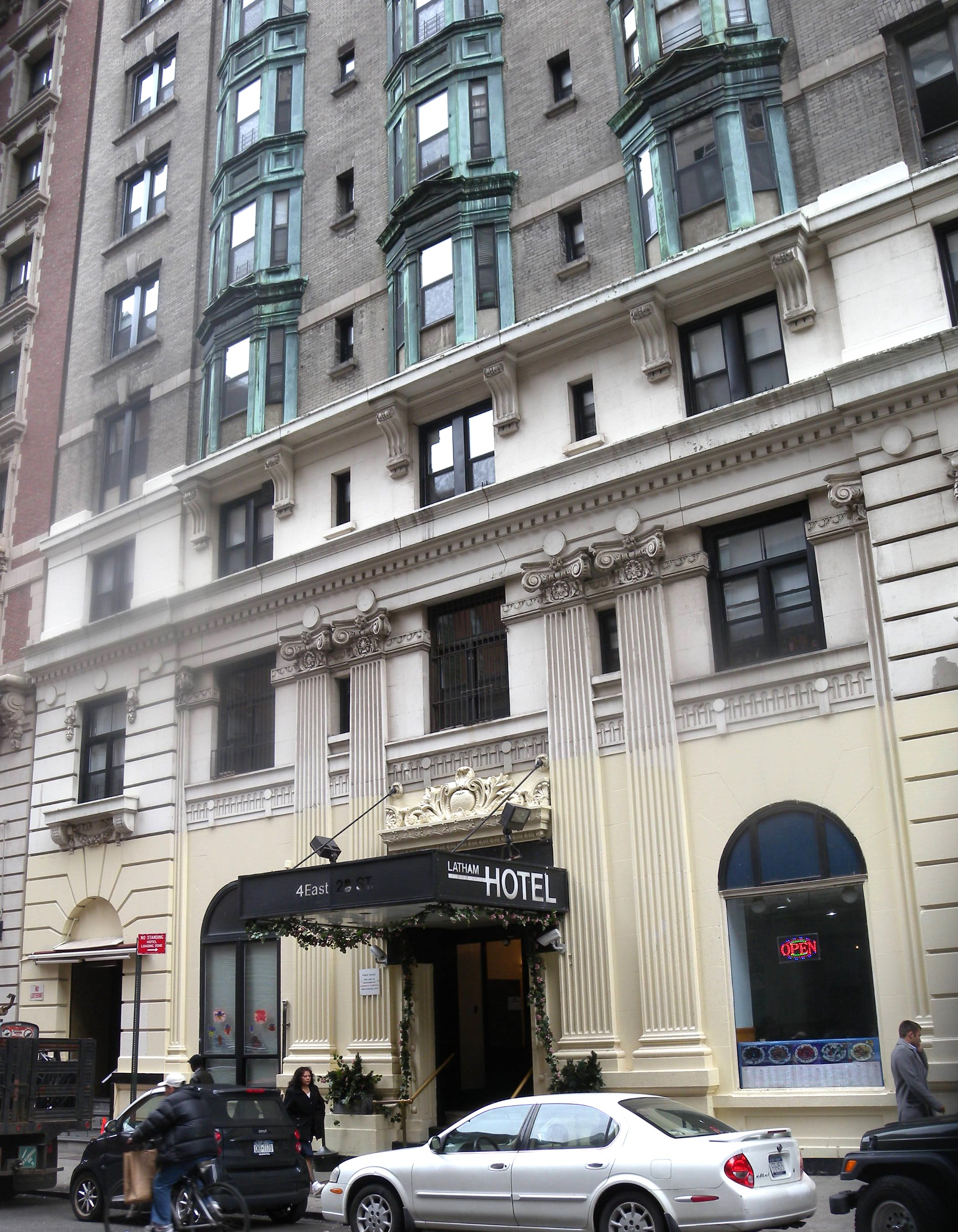
Latham Hotel

Allen designed the Latham Hotel, a 13-story building on East 28th Street, in 1906. It is now a budget hotel, but is ideally located for tourists, near the Empire State Building and convenient to Penn Station and Grand Central. The building is also home to Latham Properties, a full-service real estate firm in existence since 1979 that was active in purchasing hotels in Manhattan and South Beach in the mid 1980s and early 1990s. It still owns and manages a broad portfolio of properties in the New York and Miami metro areas.

== Biography ==
Allen was born on July 19, 1867, in New York City, the son of Baptist minister Adoniram Judson Allen and his wife Marianna. He graduated from the Columbia University School of Architecture in 1891 and was engaged in architectural design until his retirement in 1933.

In later life, Allen was a resident of Manhattan. He died on March 25, 1958, at St. Francis Hospital in The Bronx.
