= Otto Fenn =

American photographer

Otto Fenn Jr. (February 21, 1913 – February 5, 1993) was an American photographer of fashion, celebrity portraits, architecture and food photography. Fenn was an early friend and creative collaborator of artist Andy Warhol. In later years, Fenn became a historic preservationist, known for his efforts to preserve the historically significant architecture of the Village of Sag Harbor, New York.

== Early life and background ==
Otto Fenn was born on February 21, 1913, in New York City. He was the son of Otto Fenn Sr. and Estelle Dupree Fenn, both performers at the New York Hippodrome. His brother, Gene Fenn, became a fashion photographer and painter. Fenn attended the New York School of Design (now called the New York School of Interior Design) from 1931 to 1935 where he studied painting, scenic design and window-display. After graduating, Fenn began working for French-American sculptor Pierre Bourdelle, assisting him on his bas-relief sculptures and murals for the 1936 Texas Centennial Exposition, the 1939 New York World's Fair, and for the transatlantic ocean liner S.S. America(1940). Fenn designed stage sets for summer stock theater in Tamworth, New Hampshire, where he was art director for The Barnstormers Theater between 1938 and 1940.

== Photography career ==
Fenn transitioned into photography work in 1941 when Louise Dahl-Wolfe, a fashion photographer for Harper's Bazaar, hired him as an assistant. In spring 1946, they traveled to Paris, France, to photograph the first post-World War II fashion collections. Fenn remained in Paris for six months to work as a staff photographer for Harper's Bazaar Paris.

In 1948, Fenn opened his own photography studio in the Graybar Building at 420 Lexington Avenue and in 1952 moved to 132 East 58th Street in Midtown Manhattan. Fenn photographed fashion for Town & Country magazine and Bergdorf Goodman, and captured portraits of personalities including Jean Cocteau, Gore Vidal, Mae West, William Saroyan, and Tallulah Bankhead. In 1950, Harry Rodman, director of advertising for Lord & Taylor department store, hired Fenn for their commercial fashion photography account. He continued to work for Lord & Taylor throughout his career as well as for clients Daniel and Charles Advertising Agency, Amelia Earhart Luggage, CBS and NBC television and radio. Fenn's photographs were published in Harper's Bazaar, Vogue, Theatre Arts, The New Yorker, The New York Times and The New York Herald Tribune.

In 1961, Fenn formed a partnership with still life painter Mary Faulconer to produce editorial photographs of food, home interiors, and architectural design. Faulconer/Fenn photographs appeared in House Beautiful, House & Garden, Woman's Day, Look, Better Homes and Gardens, Ladies Home Journal, and This Week Magazine.

== Work with Andy Warhol ==
Andy Warhol, then a young commercial artist, met Otto Fenn in 1951 and began stopping by Fenn's studio frequently. Throughout the 1950s they collaborated on a number of creative projects. Warhol posed for Fenn portraits. Fenn experimented with projections of Warhol drawings of flowers and butterflies onto the faces of models. Warhol drew backdrops for Fenn's fashion sittings, created drawings of Fenn from Fenn's self-portraits, and created a series of drawings of men in drag based on photographs taken by Fenn. According to Whitney Museum of American Art curator, Donna De Salvo, Fenn's studio was a prototype for The Factory, Warhol's studio of the 1960s.

== Historic preservation work ==
In 1961, Fenn purchased and restored the historic David Hand House, dated to the 1600s, in the Village of Sag Harbor on Long Island, New York. In 1972, he was appointed as a technical advisor to the Sag Harbor Historic Preservation Commission. The Sag Harbor Village District was listed on the National Register of Historic Places in June 1973.

== Later life ==
Otto Fenn moved permanently to Sag Harbor in 1975. He died on February 5, 1993, in Sag Harbor, New York.
