= Sag Harbor Village District =

Historic district in New York, United States

- U.S. National Register of Historic Places
- U.S. Historic district
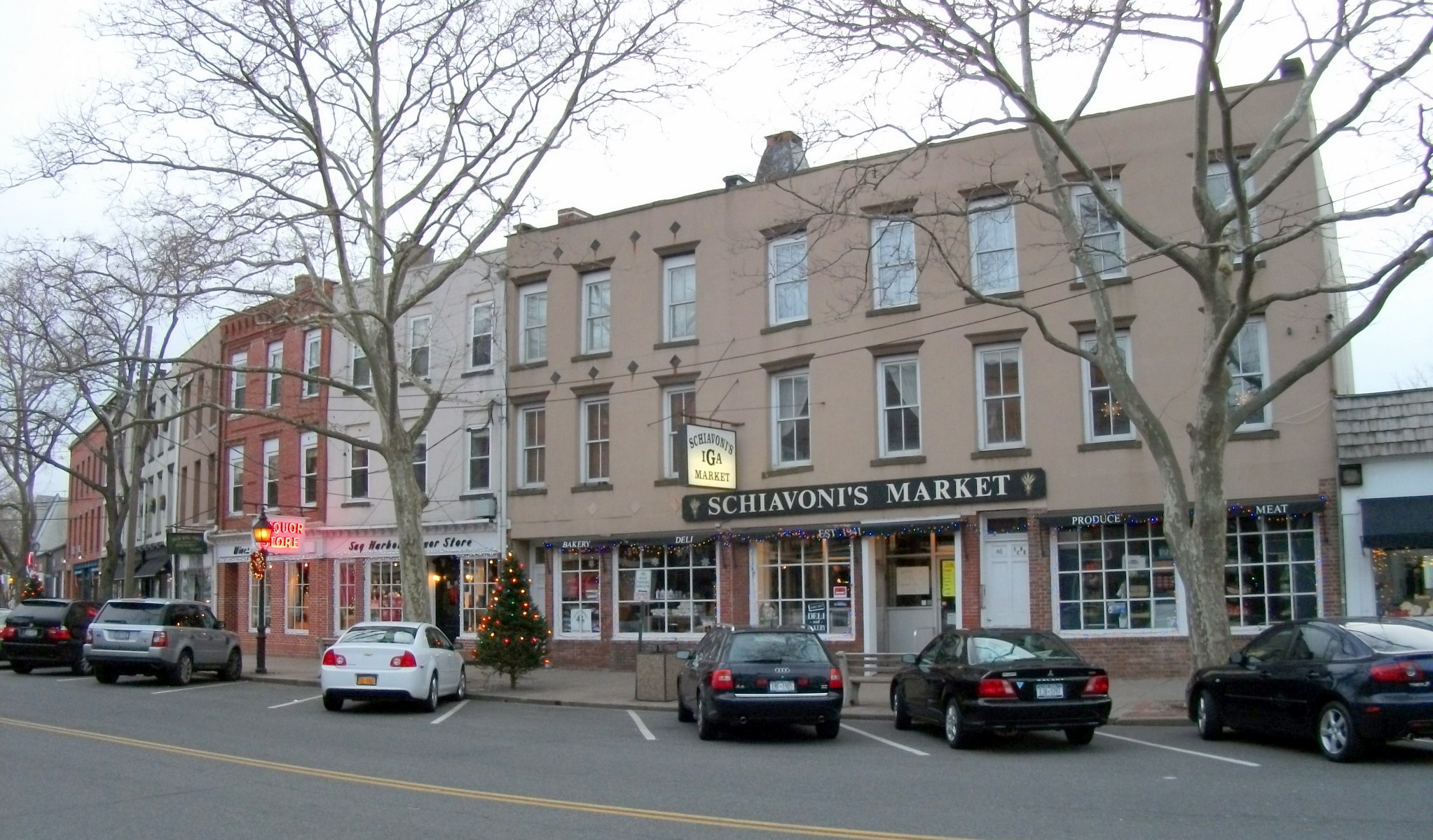
- Sag Harbor Village District, December 2010

- Location within New York Location within the United States
- Location: Roughly bounded by Sag Harbor, Rysam, Hamilton, Marsden, Main and Long Island Ave., (original); Roughly bounded by Sag Harbor, Bay, Eastville, Grand, Joel's Ln., Middle Line Hwy., Main, Glover and Long Island, Sag Harbor, New York
- Coordinates: 40°59′50″N 72°17′44″W
- Architect: Minard Lafever; unknowns
- Architectural style: Early Republic, Greek Revival, Late Victorian (original); Georgian, Federal, Greek Revival (increase)
- NRHP reference No.: 73001274, 94000400
- Added to NRHP: July 20, 1973 (original); May 10, 1994 (increase)

Sag Harbor Village District is a national historic district in Sag Harbor, Suffolk County, New York. It comprises the entire business district of the village. It includes 870 contributing buildings, seven contributing sites, two contributing structures, and three contributing objects. It includes the First Presbyterian Church, a National Historic Landmark building designed by Minard Lafever.

The district was listed on the National Register of Historic Places in 1973 and its boundaries were increased in 1994.

== Contributing properties ==
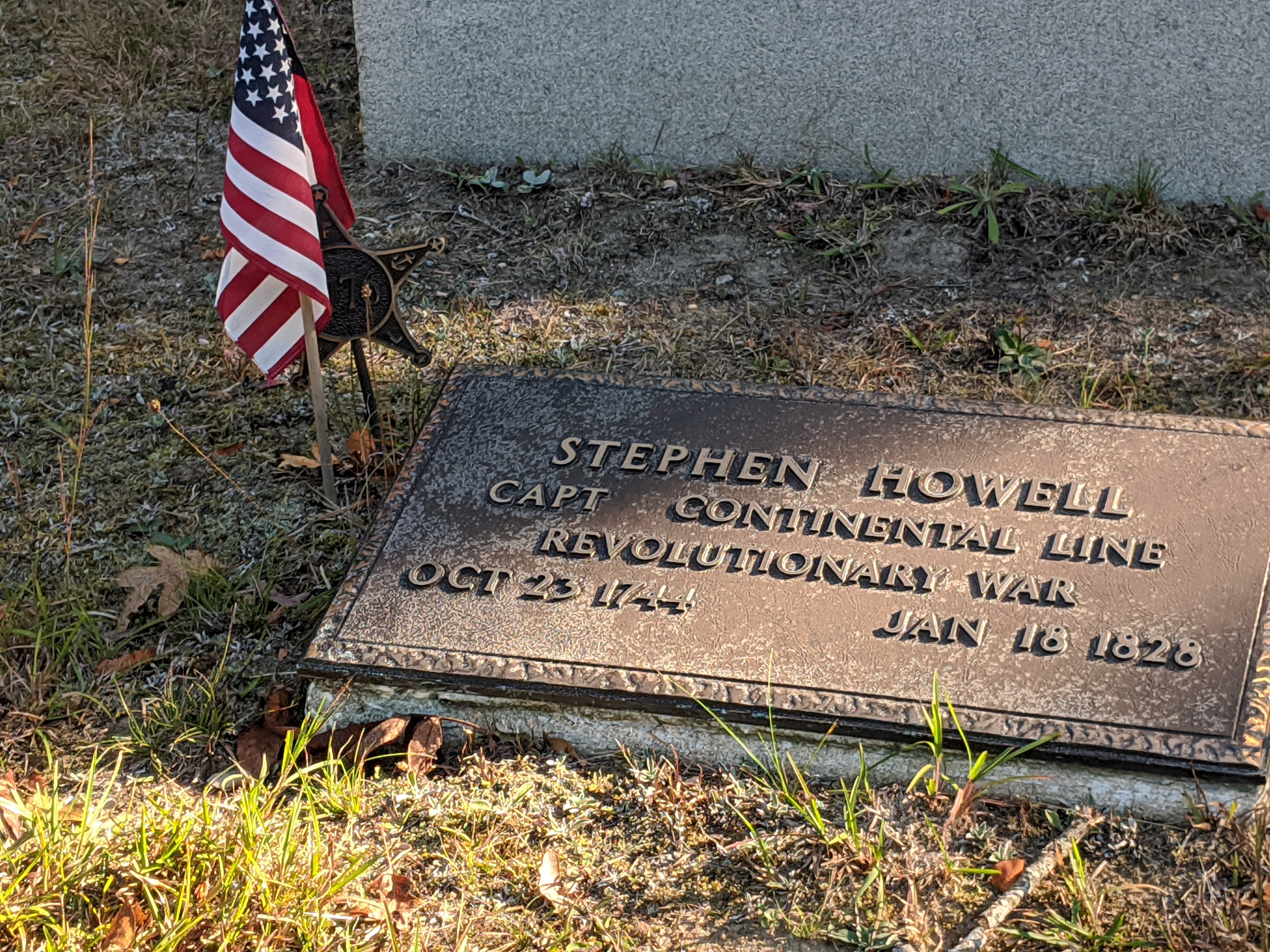
Capt Howell - Continental Army

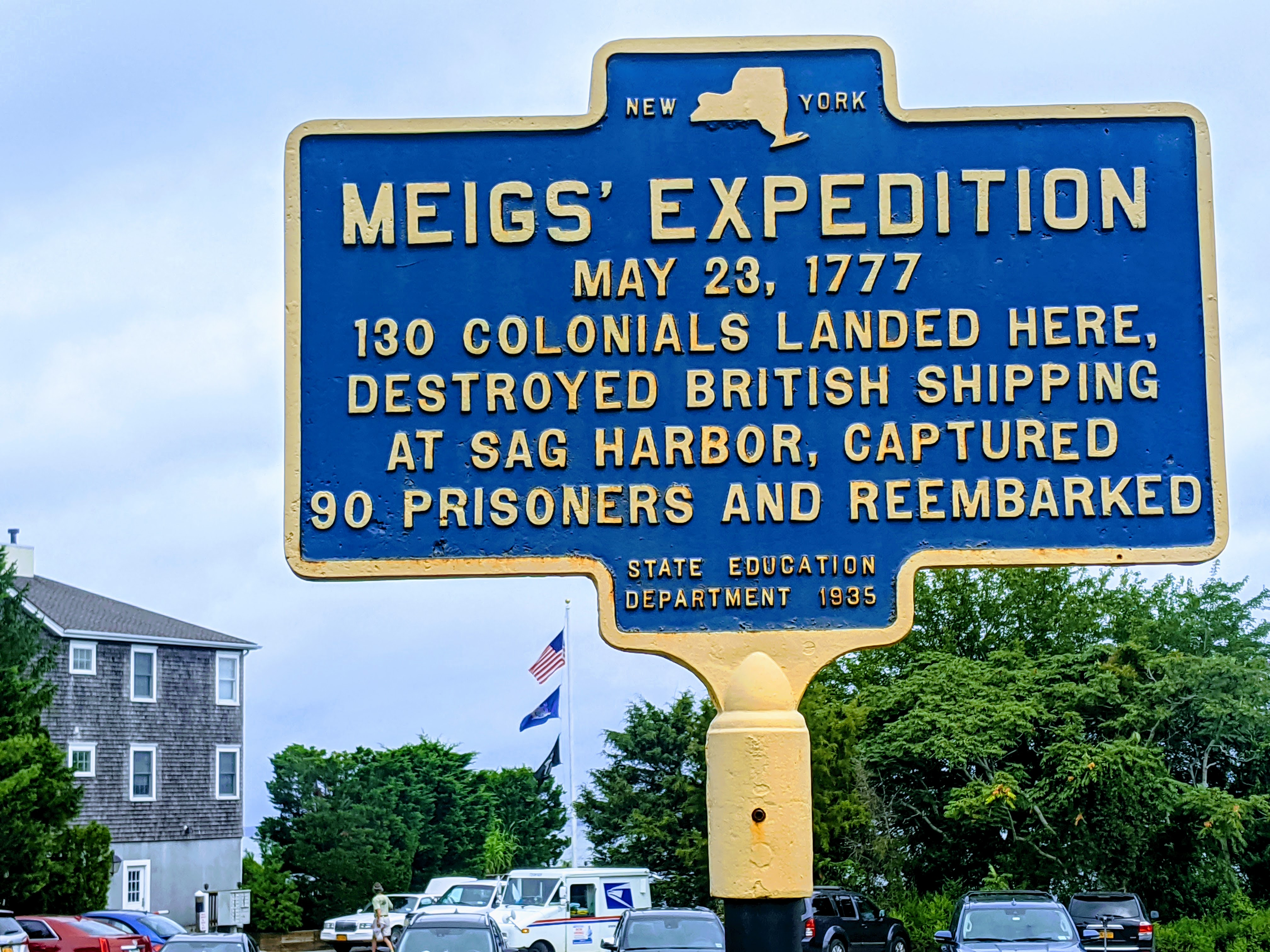
landmark marker Meigs' Expedition 20200829 110228

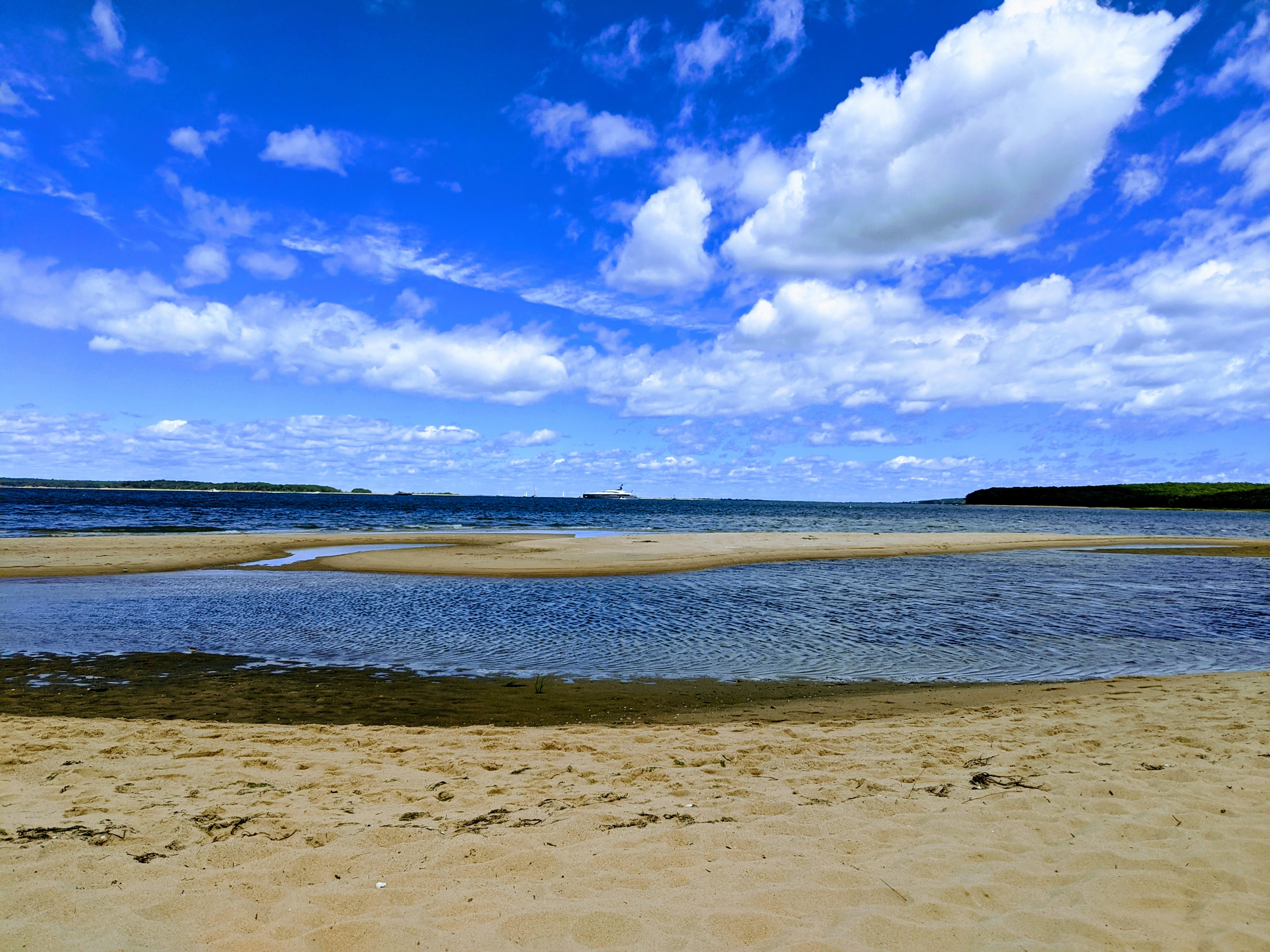
Ninevah Beach 20200830 121846

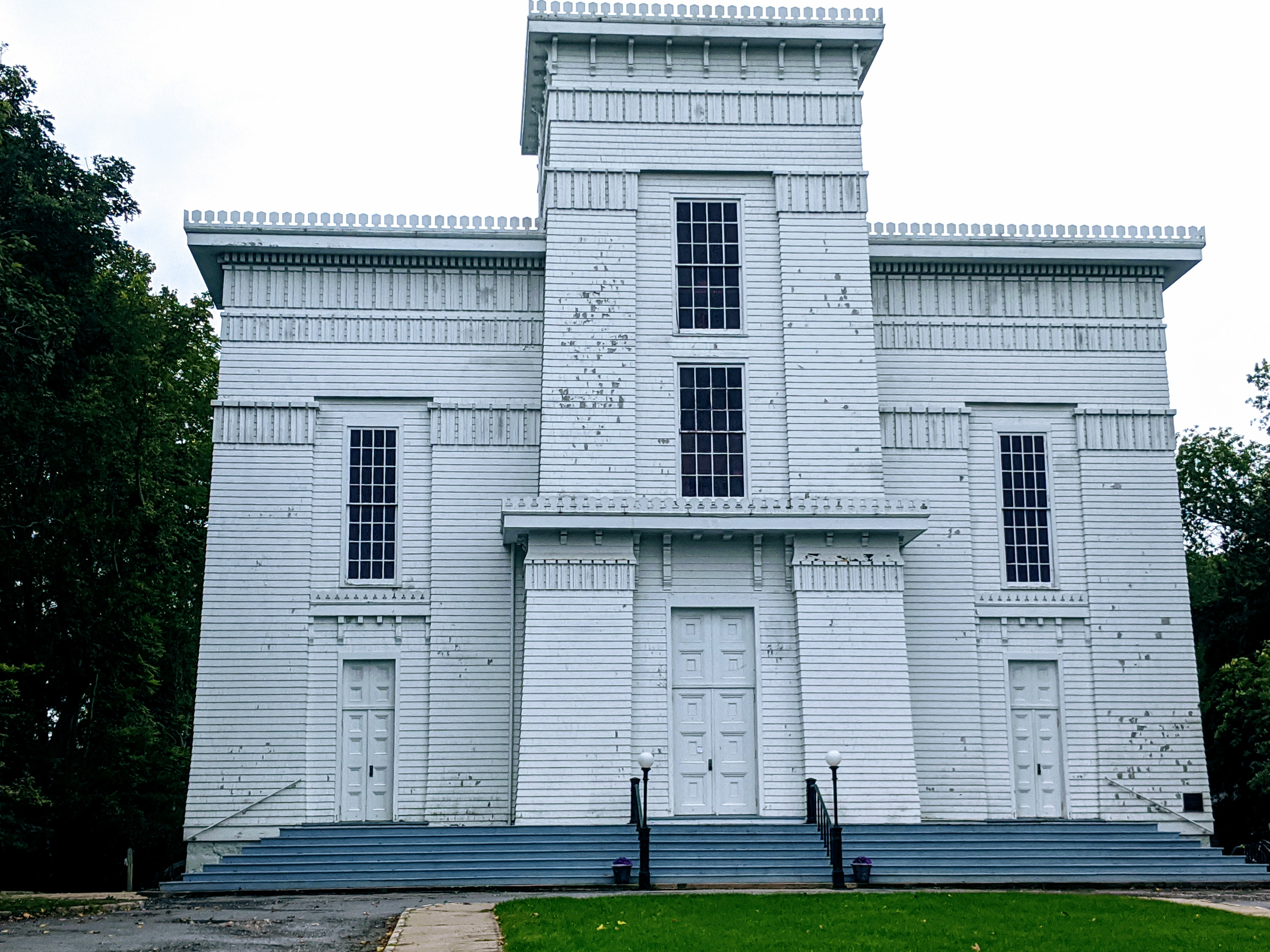
Whaler's Church 20200918 091348

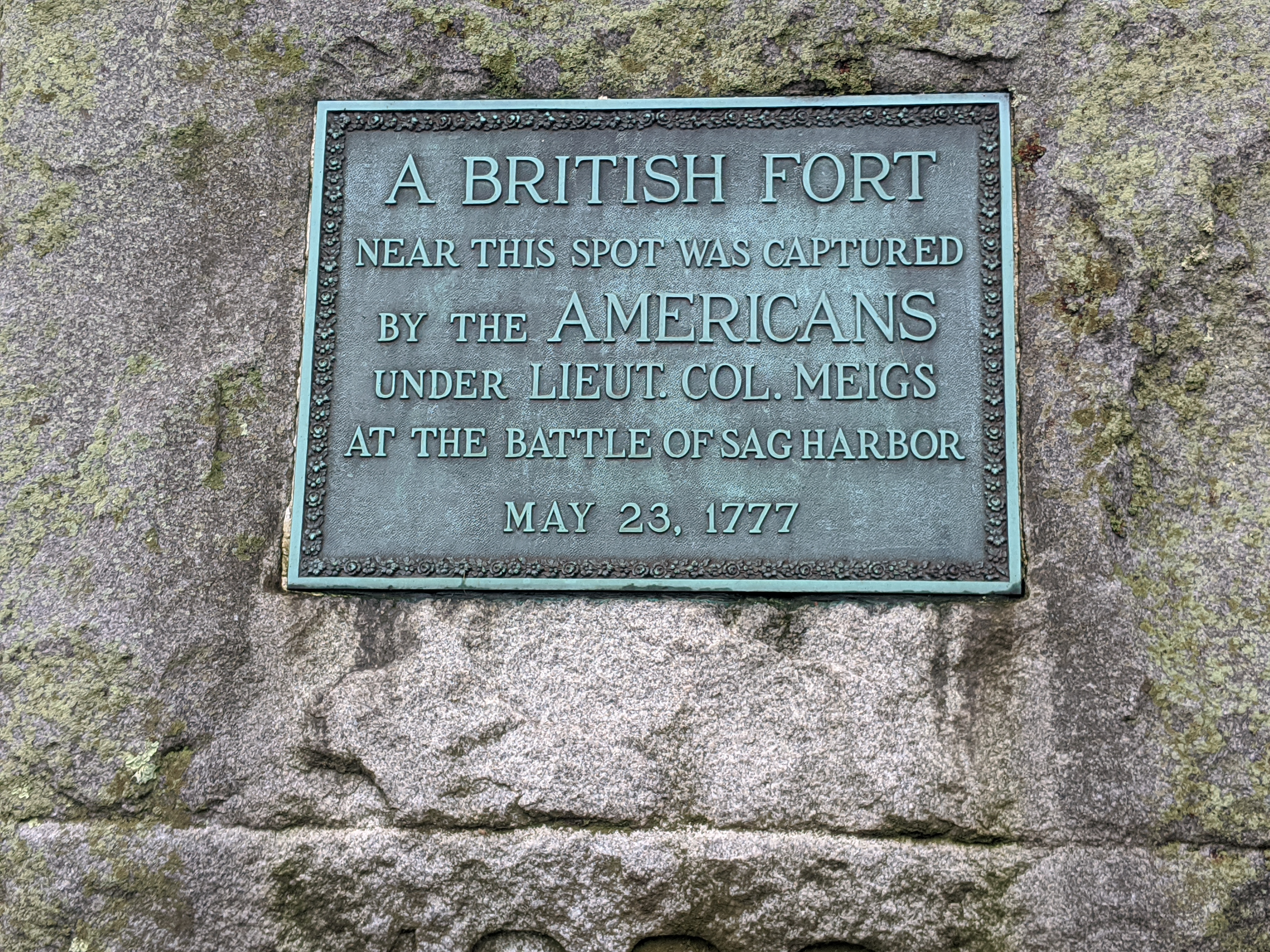
Marker at Old Burying Ground 20200918 091916

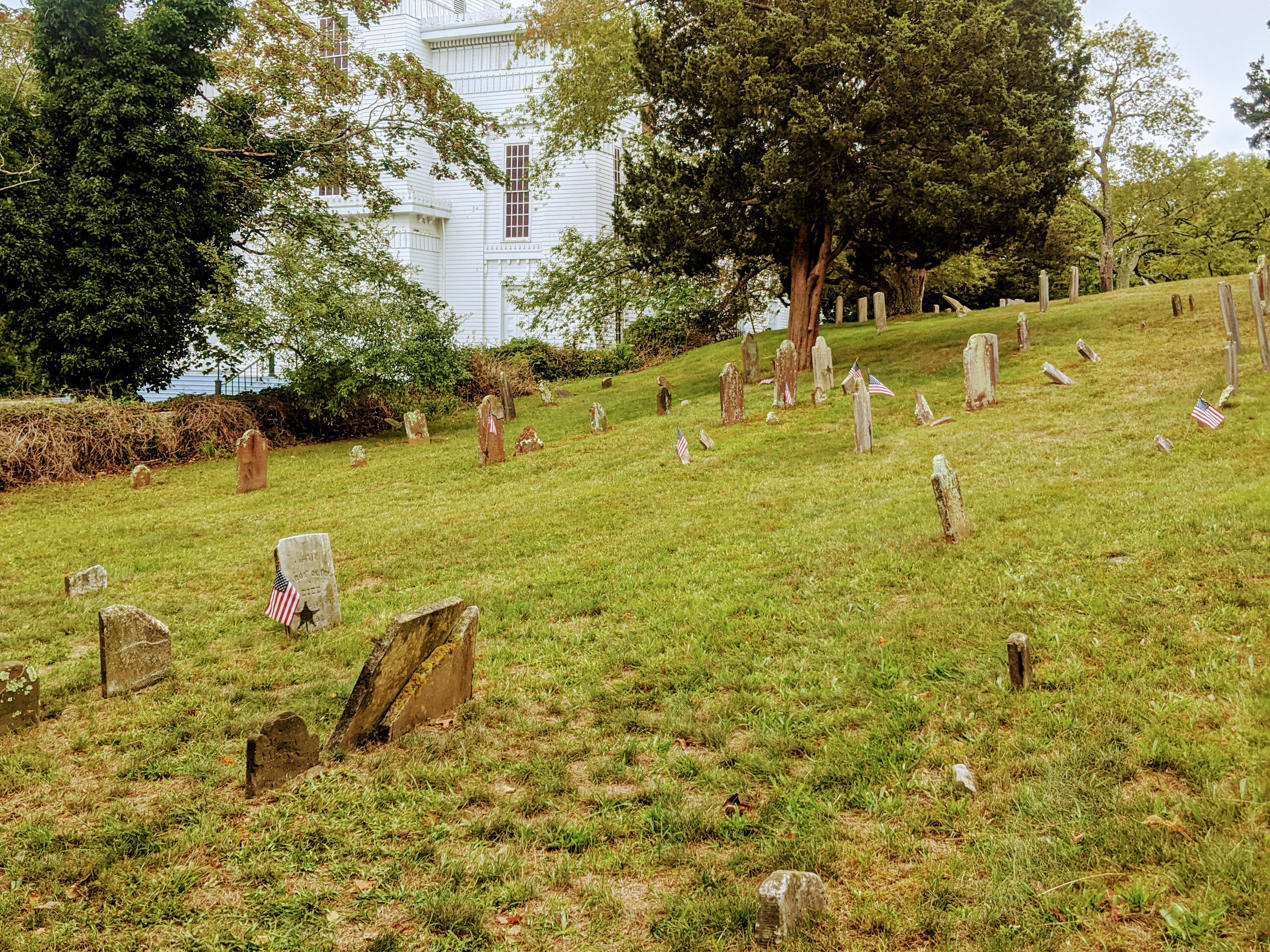
the Old Burying Ground 20200918 092109

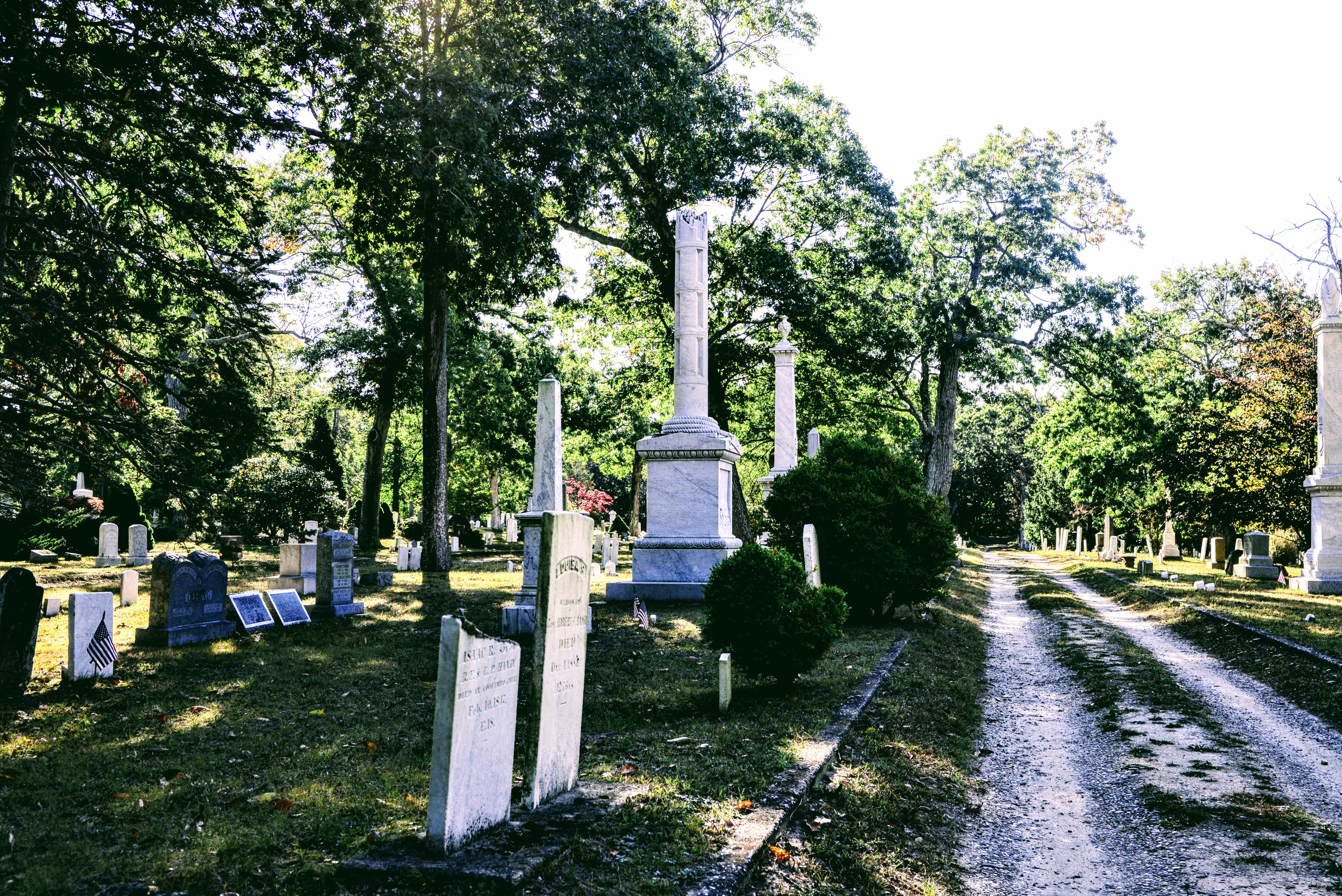
Oakland Cemetery- Whalers Broken Mast Monument

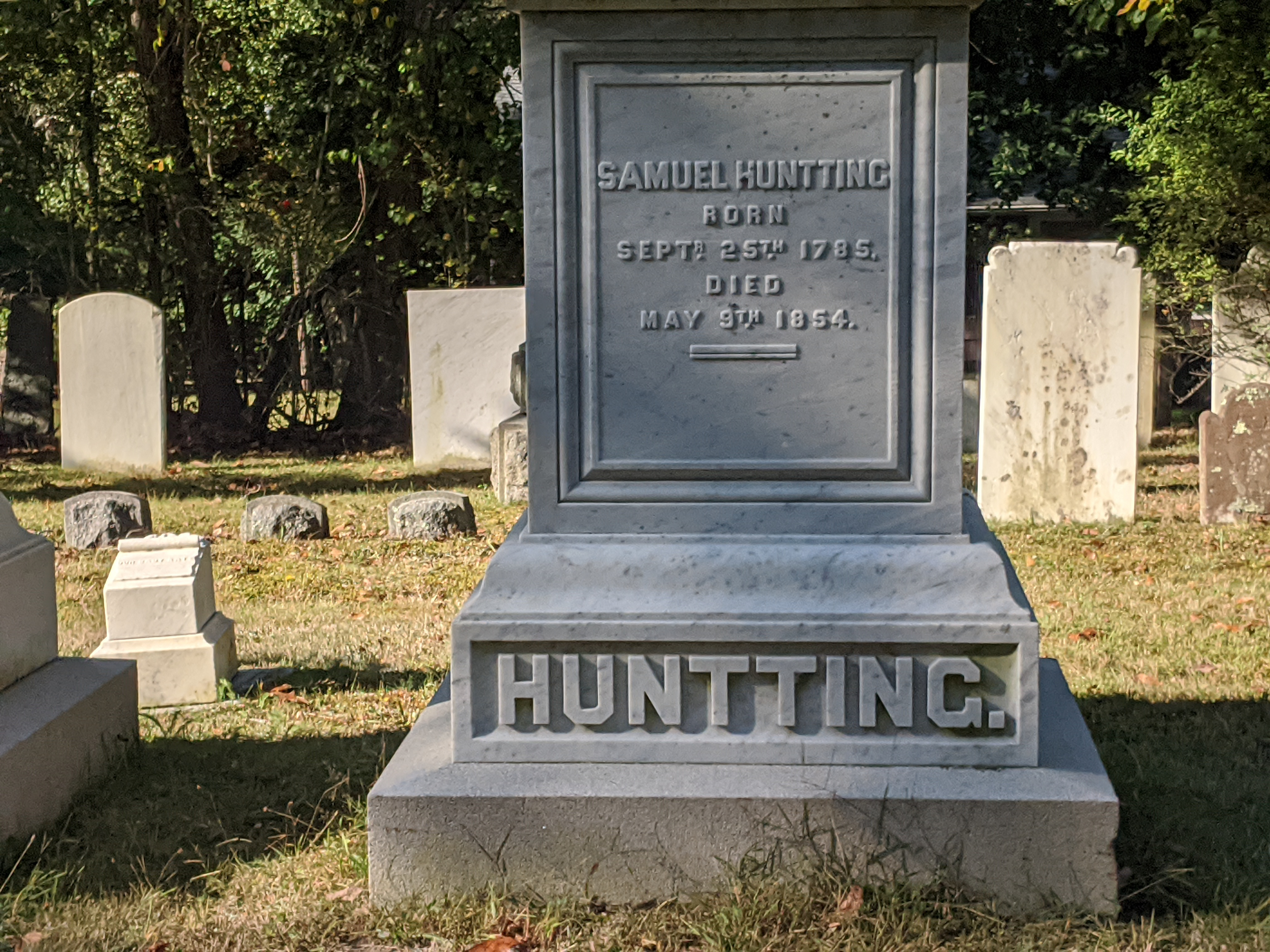
Whalers grave

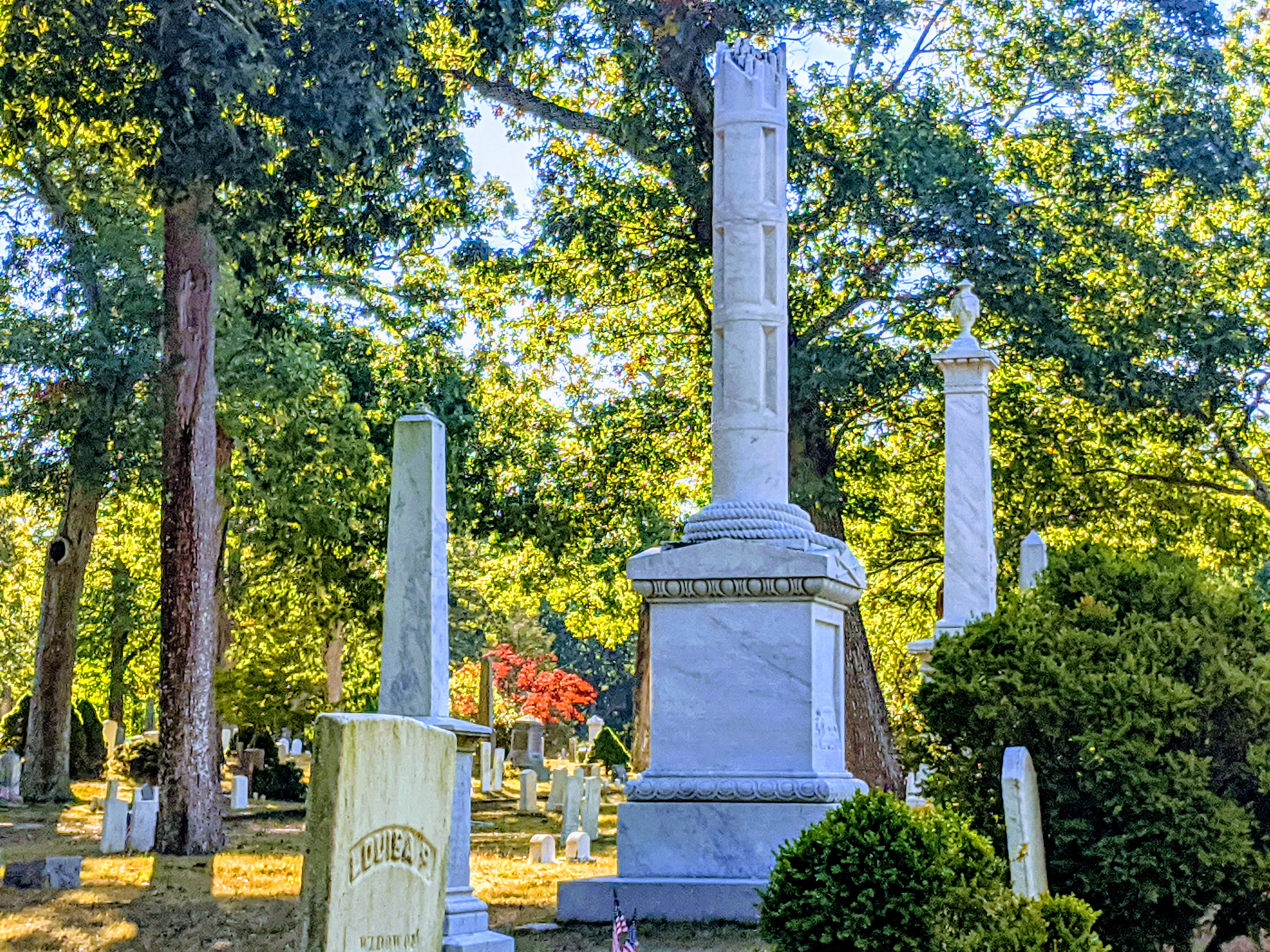
The broken mast monument/Whalers grave

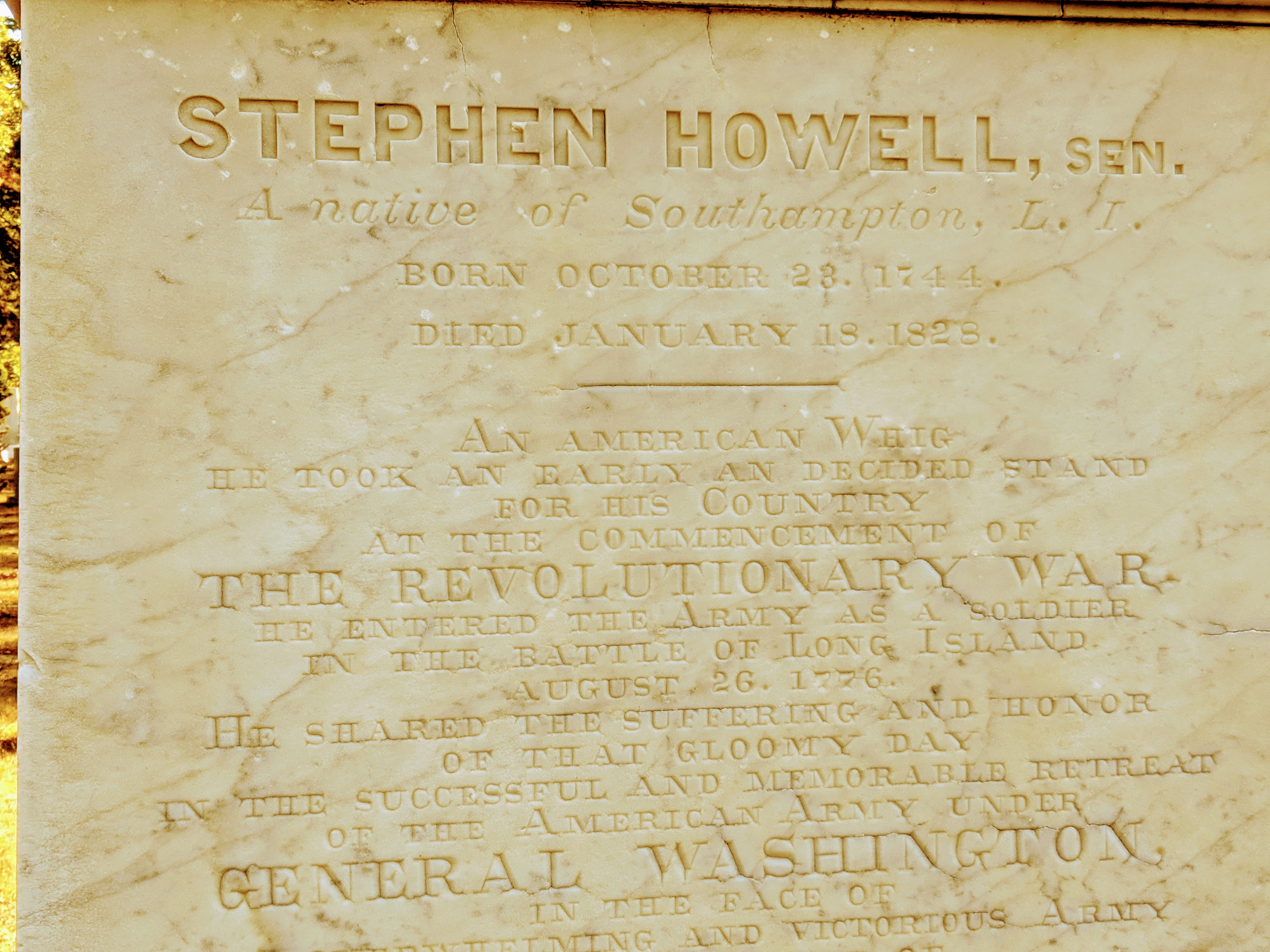
Stephen Howell's grave western side inscription

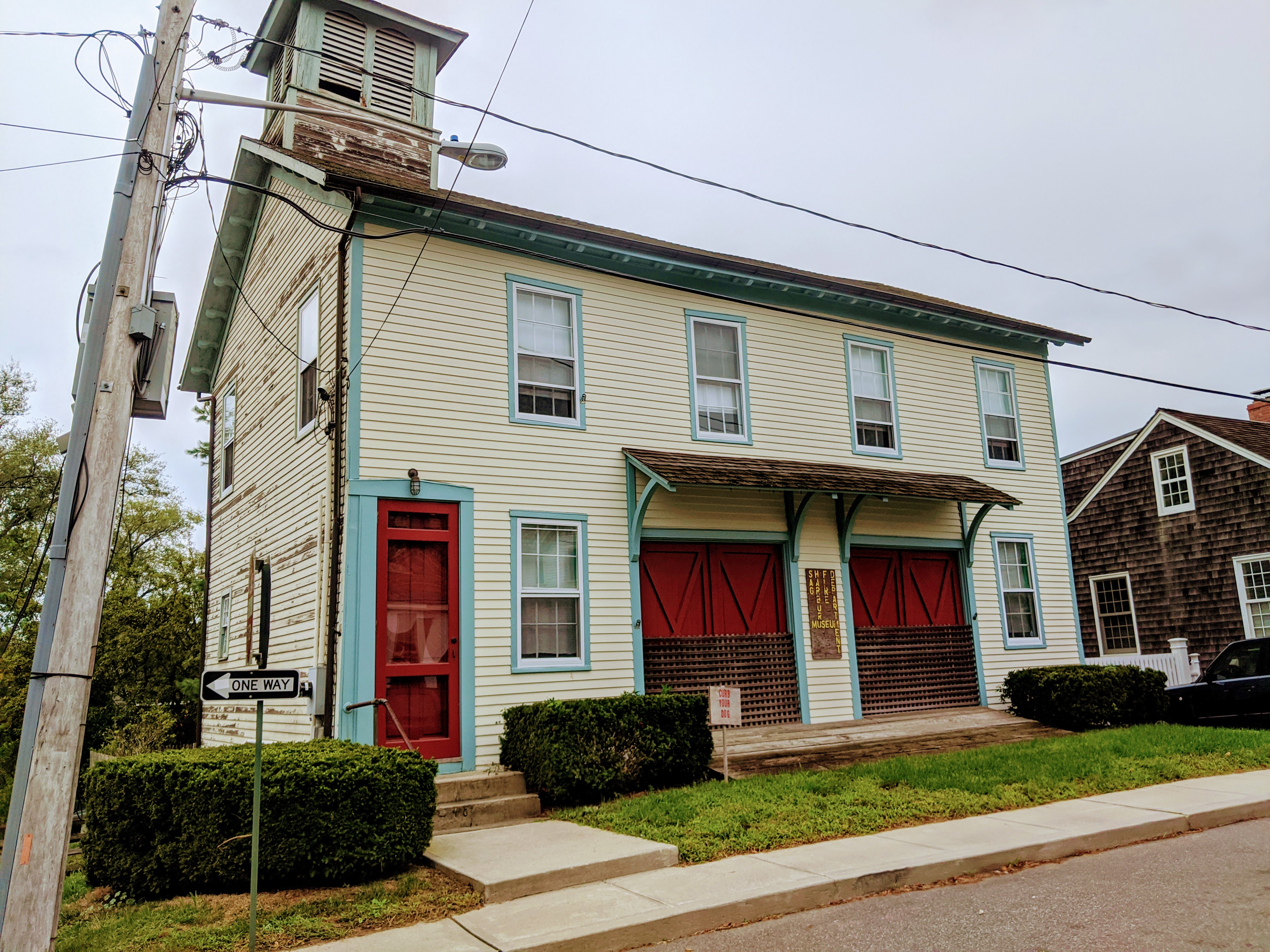
Sag Harbor Fire Department Museum 20200918 093040 Sag Harbor's First Firehouse: The Village's pioneering Fire Department, established by Chapter 58 of the Laws of New York in 1803

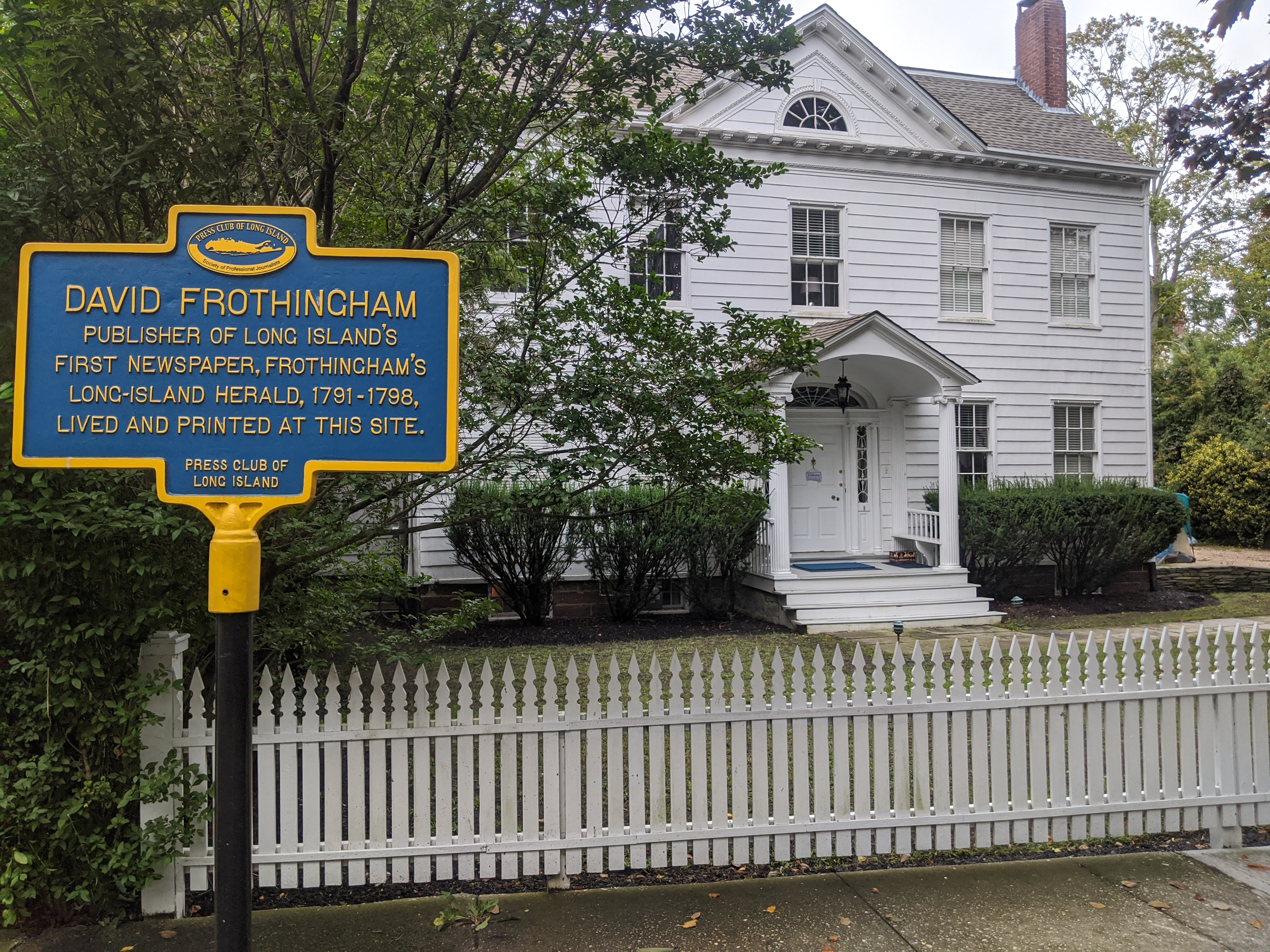
Historical marker for David Frothingham House 20200918 093549

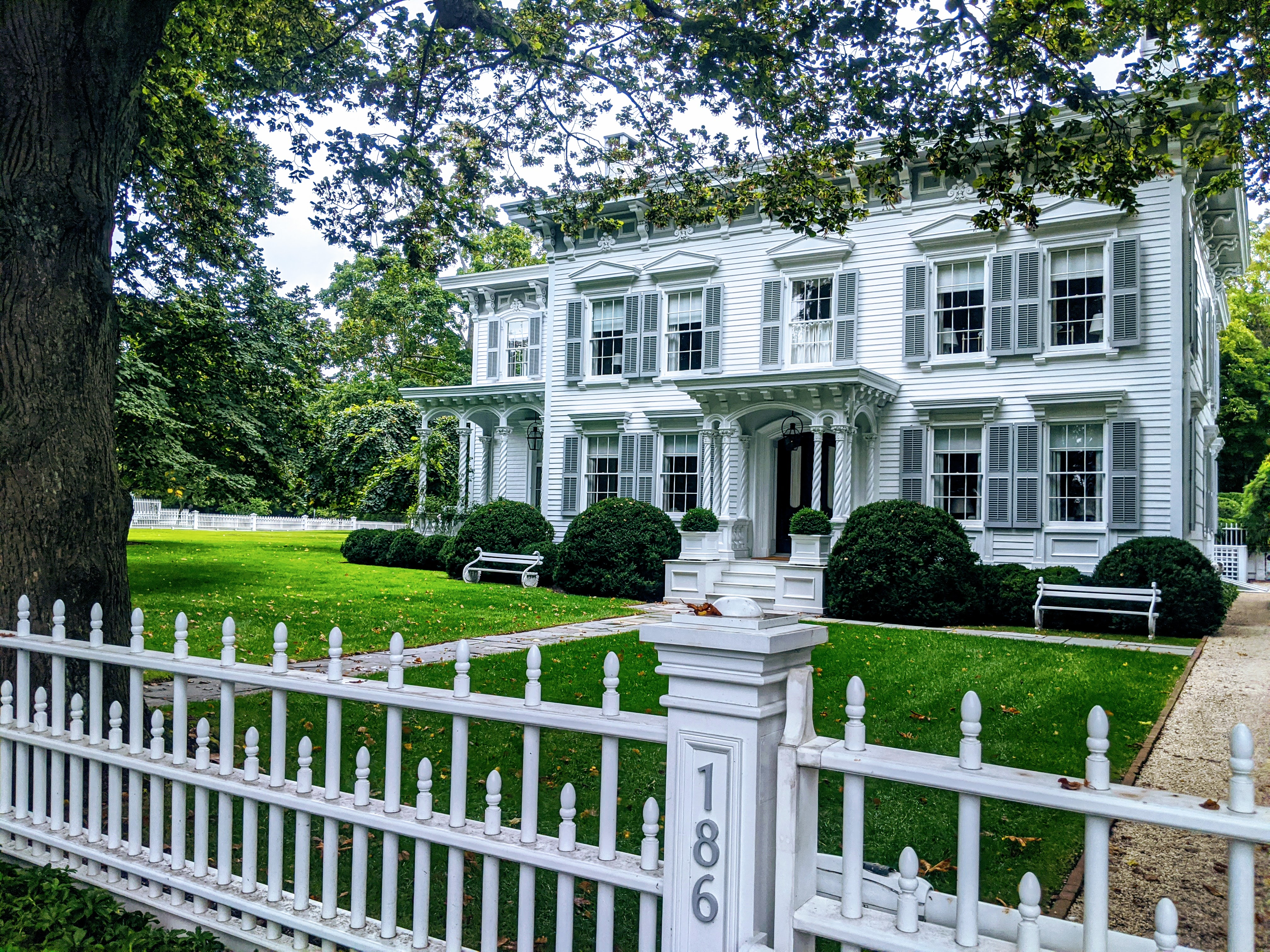
Hannibal French house 20200918 093615

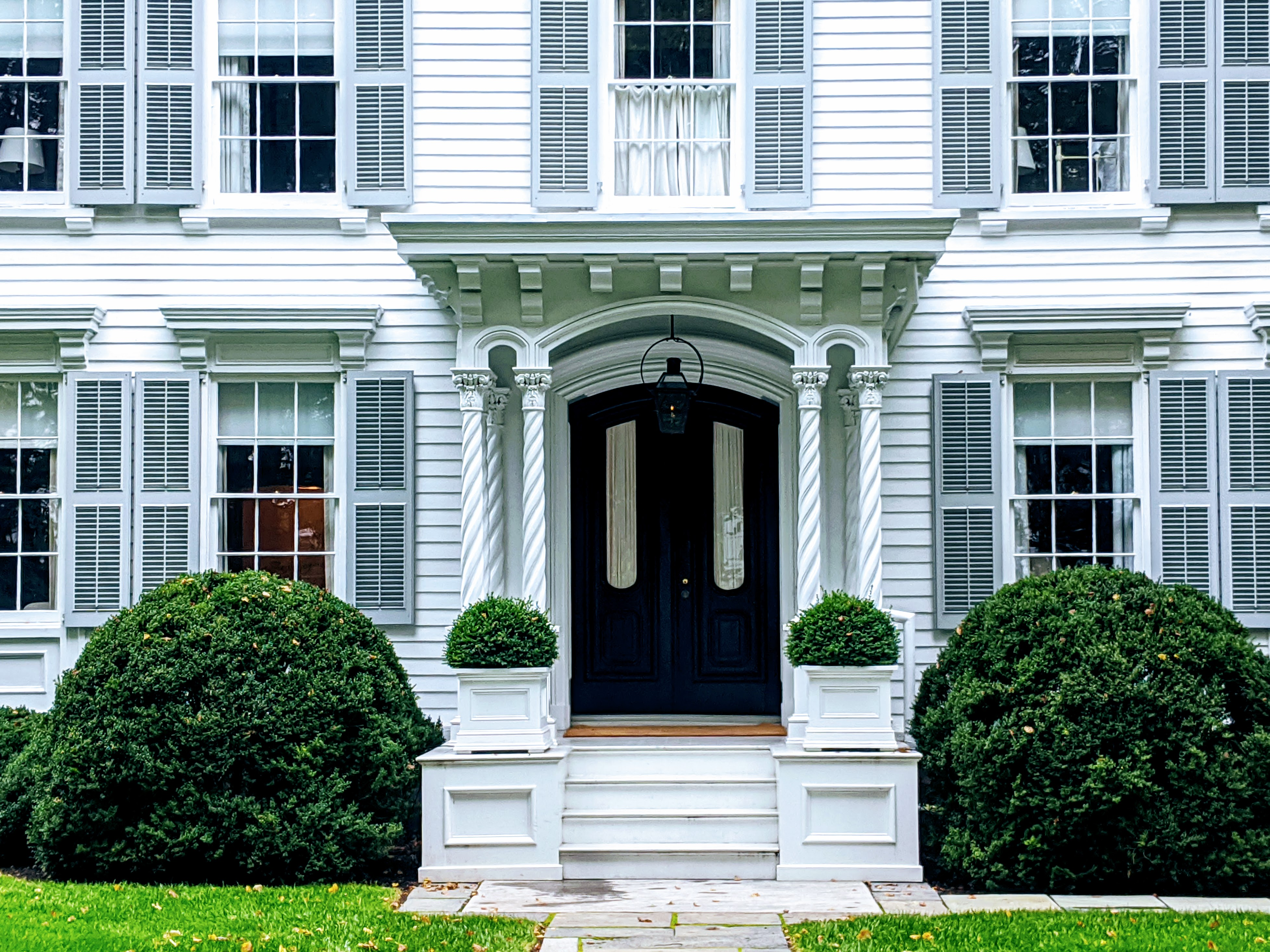
Hannibal French house 20200918 093710

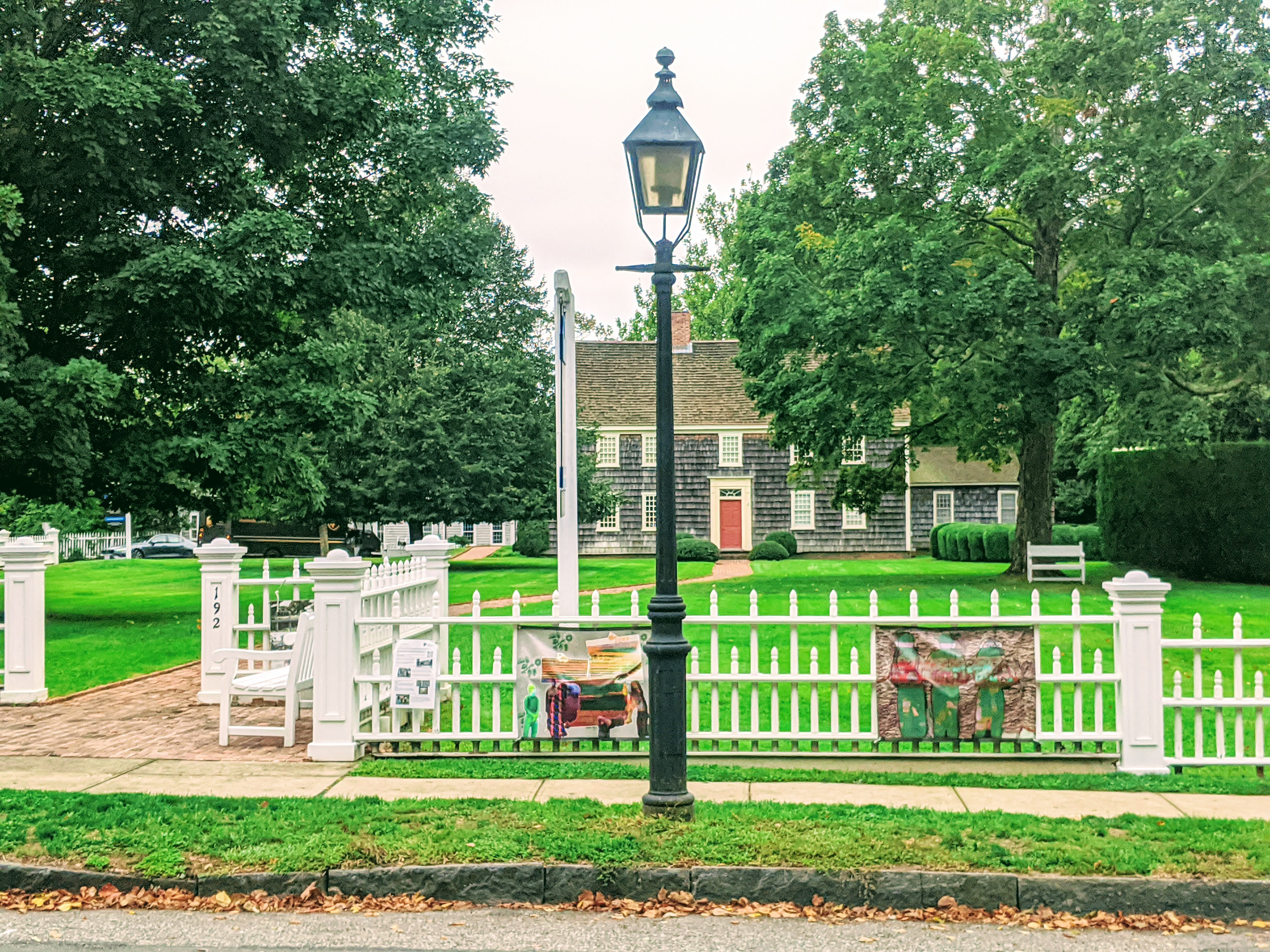
Custom House 20200918 093934

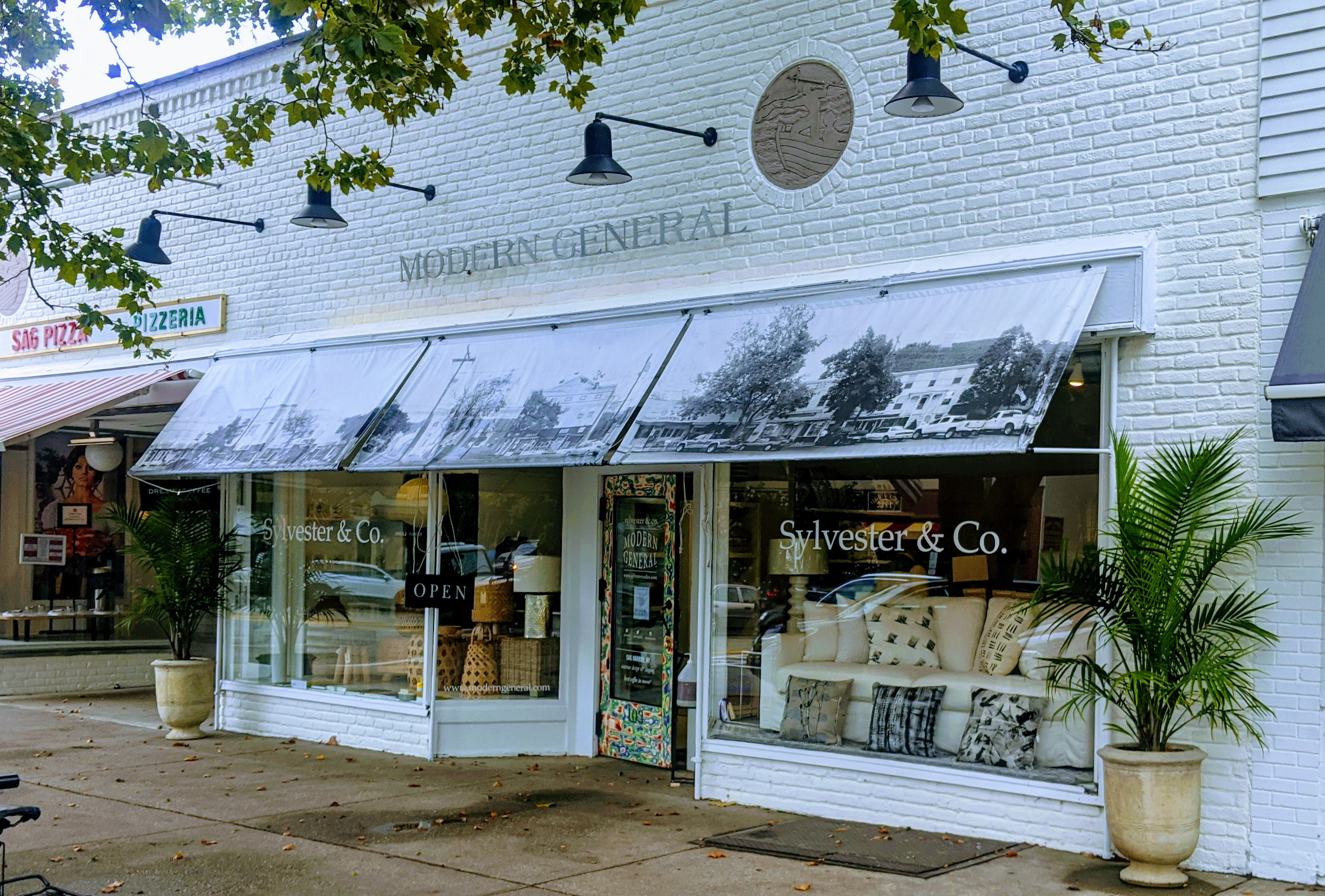
Modern General at Alvin Bldg., main st 20200918 094331

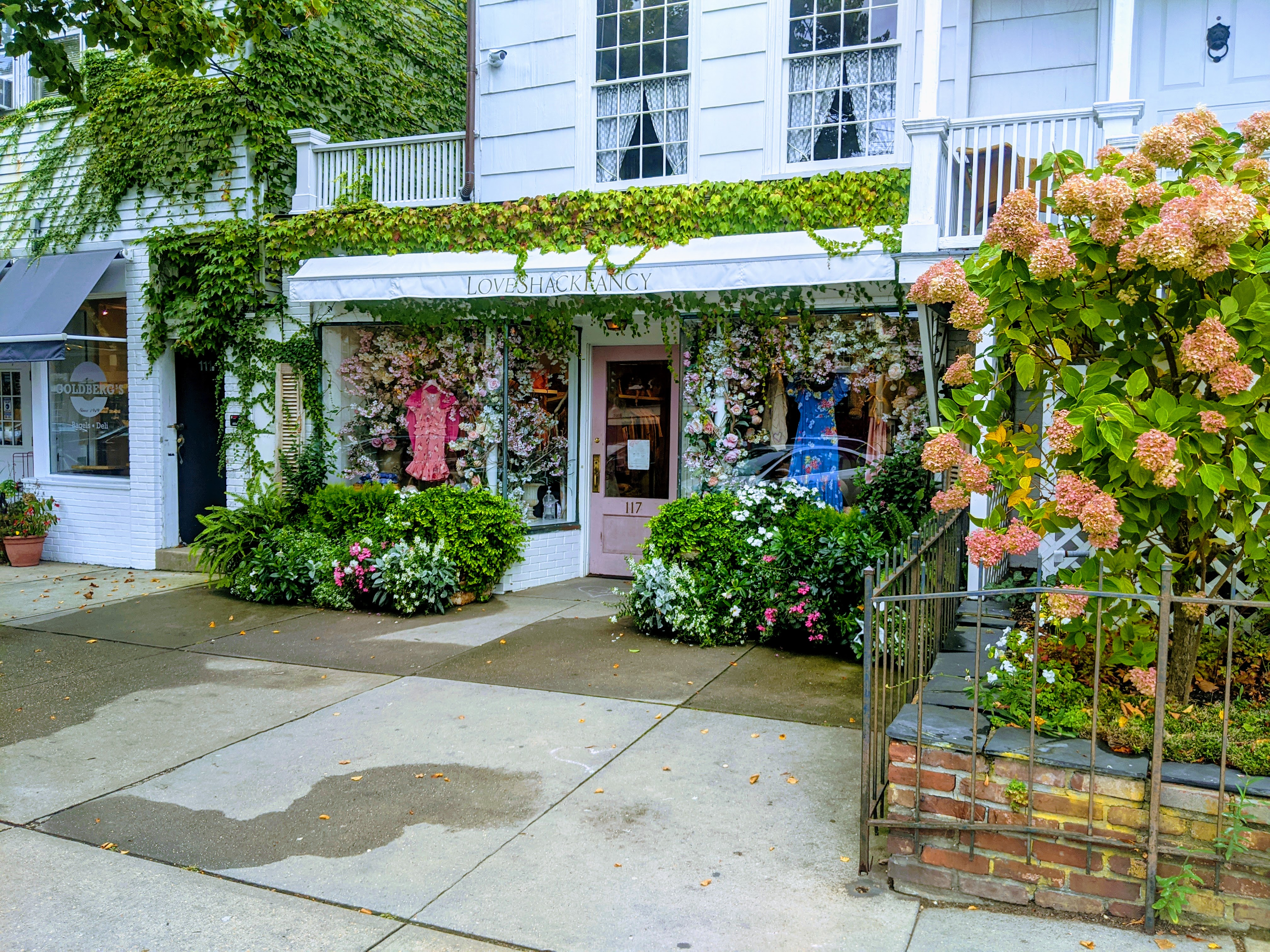
NRHP Contributing property Main St 20200918 095348

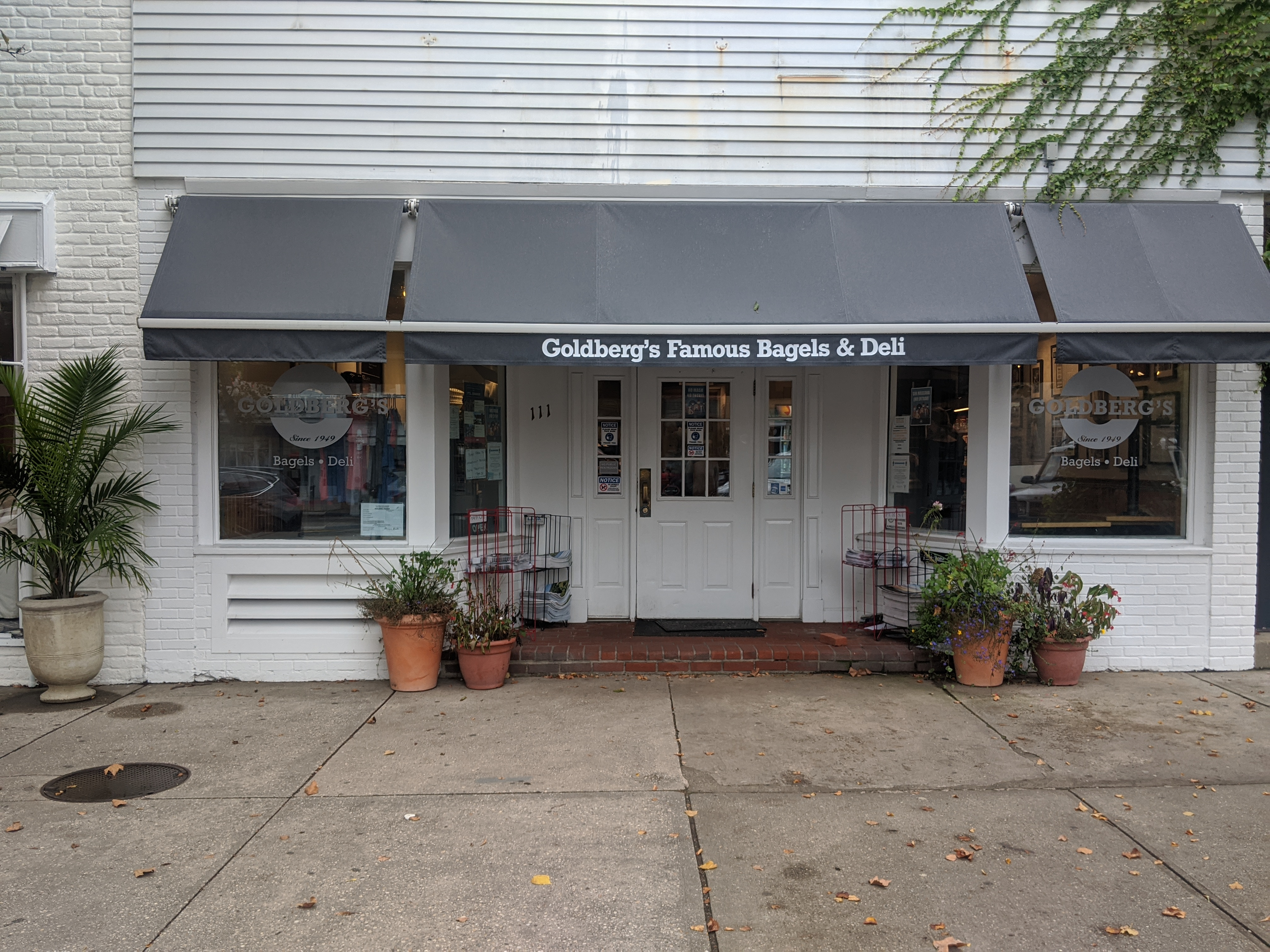
Contributing property Main St 20200918 094312

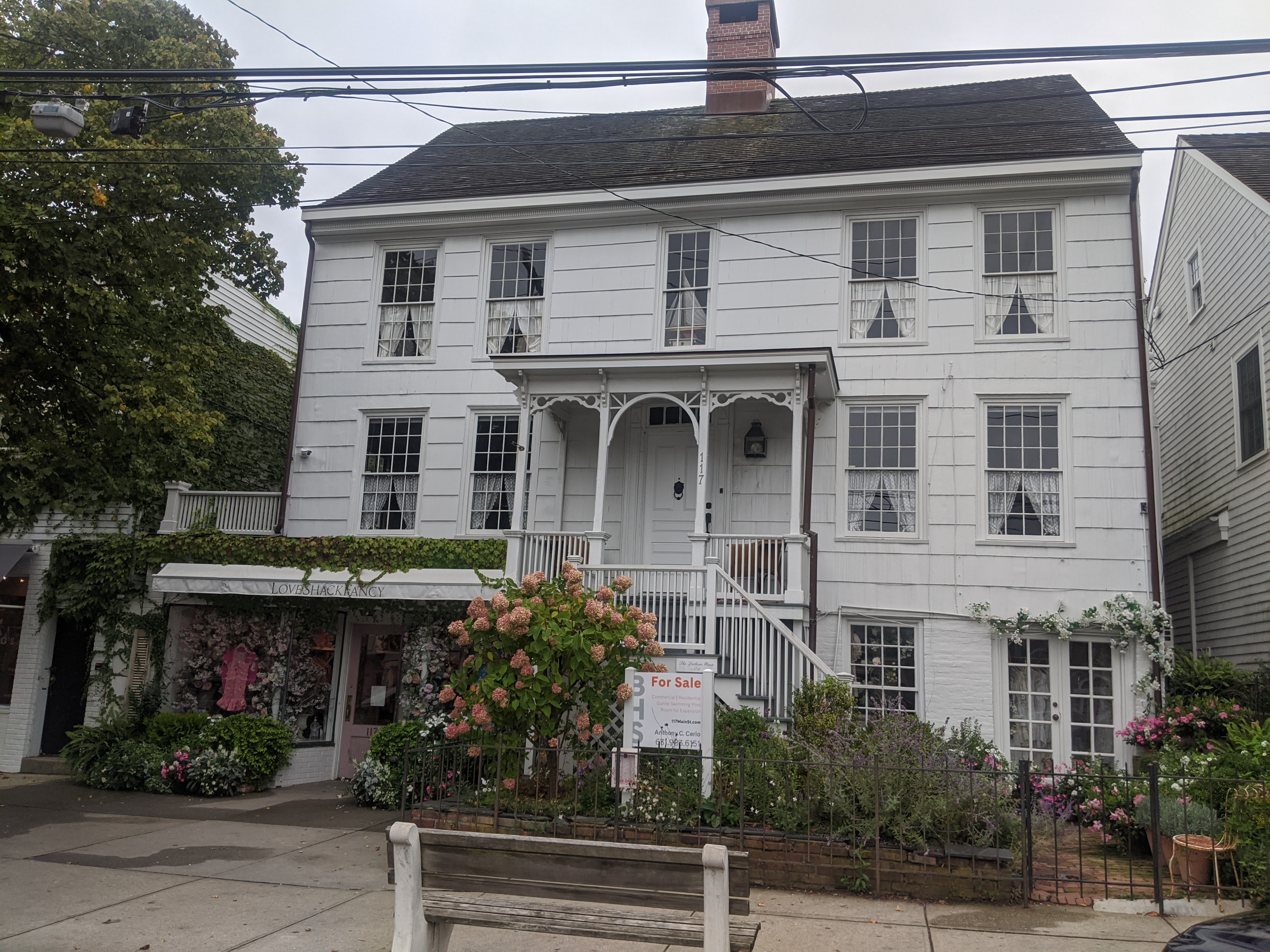
Love shack fancy at 117 main st, sag harbor 20200918 095337

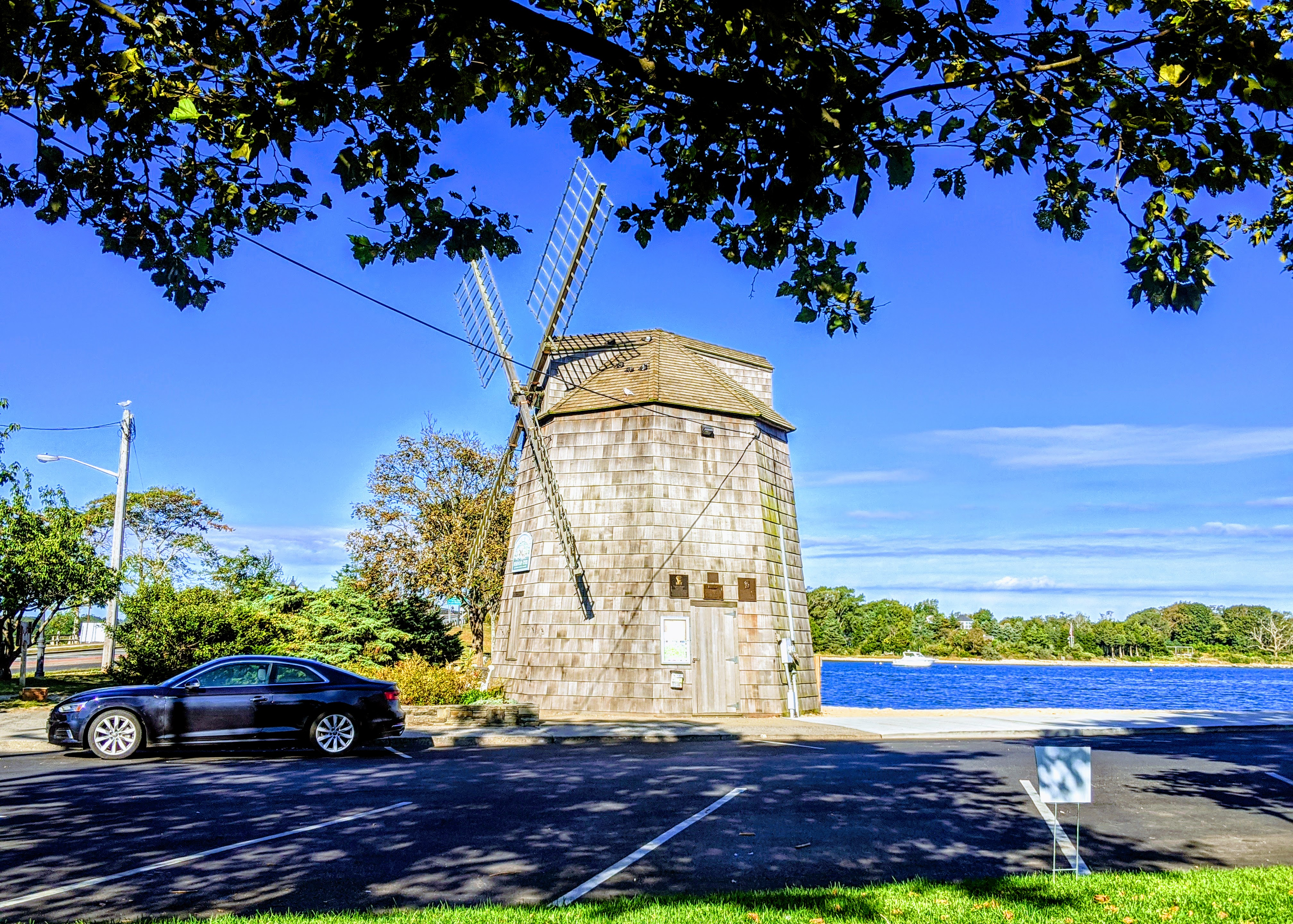
Beebe Mill replica on Windmill Beach

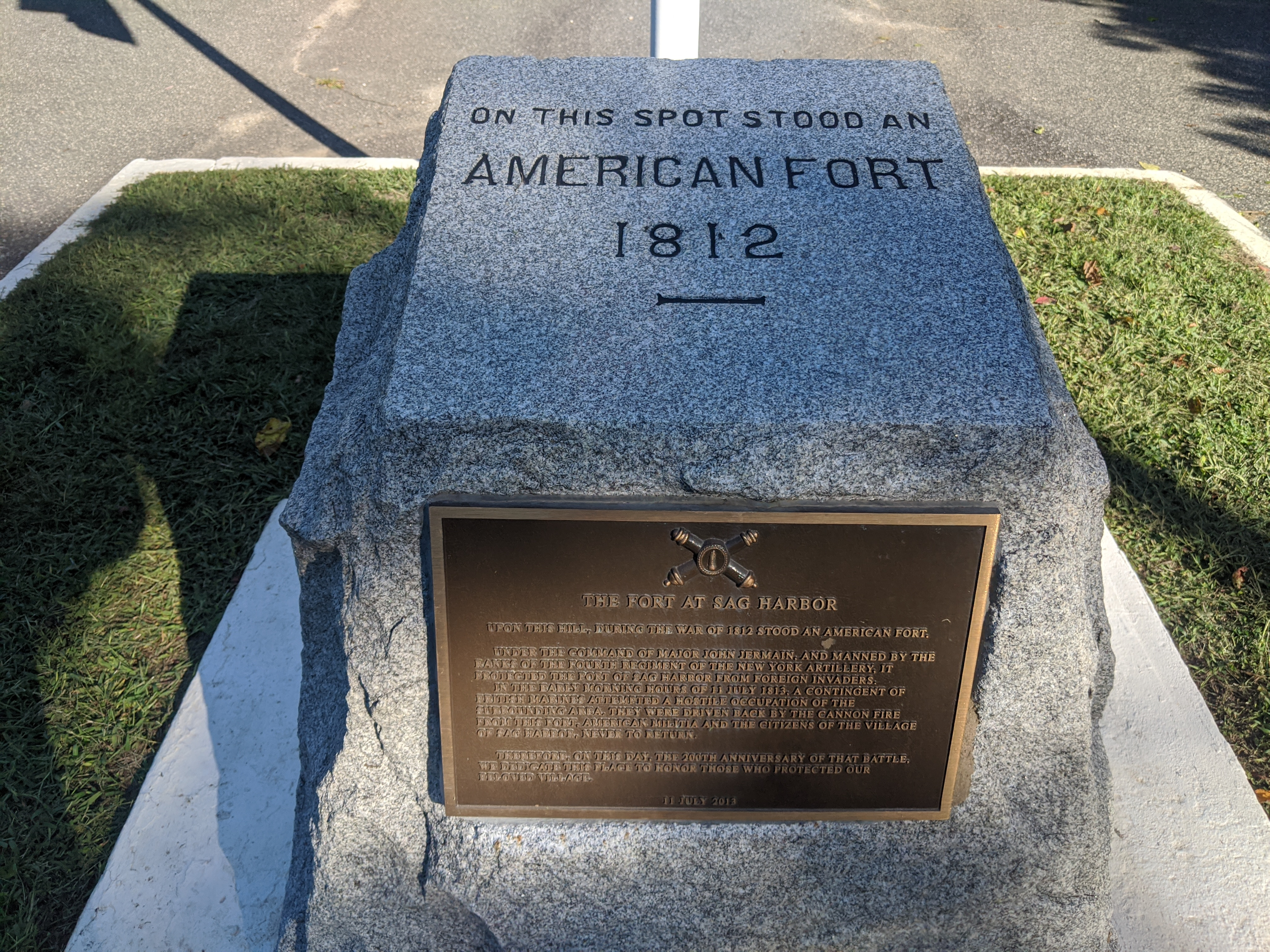
Old Fort Historic marker 20200919 091014

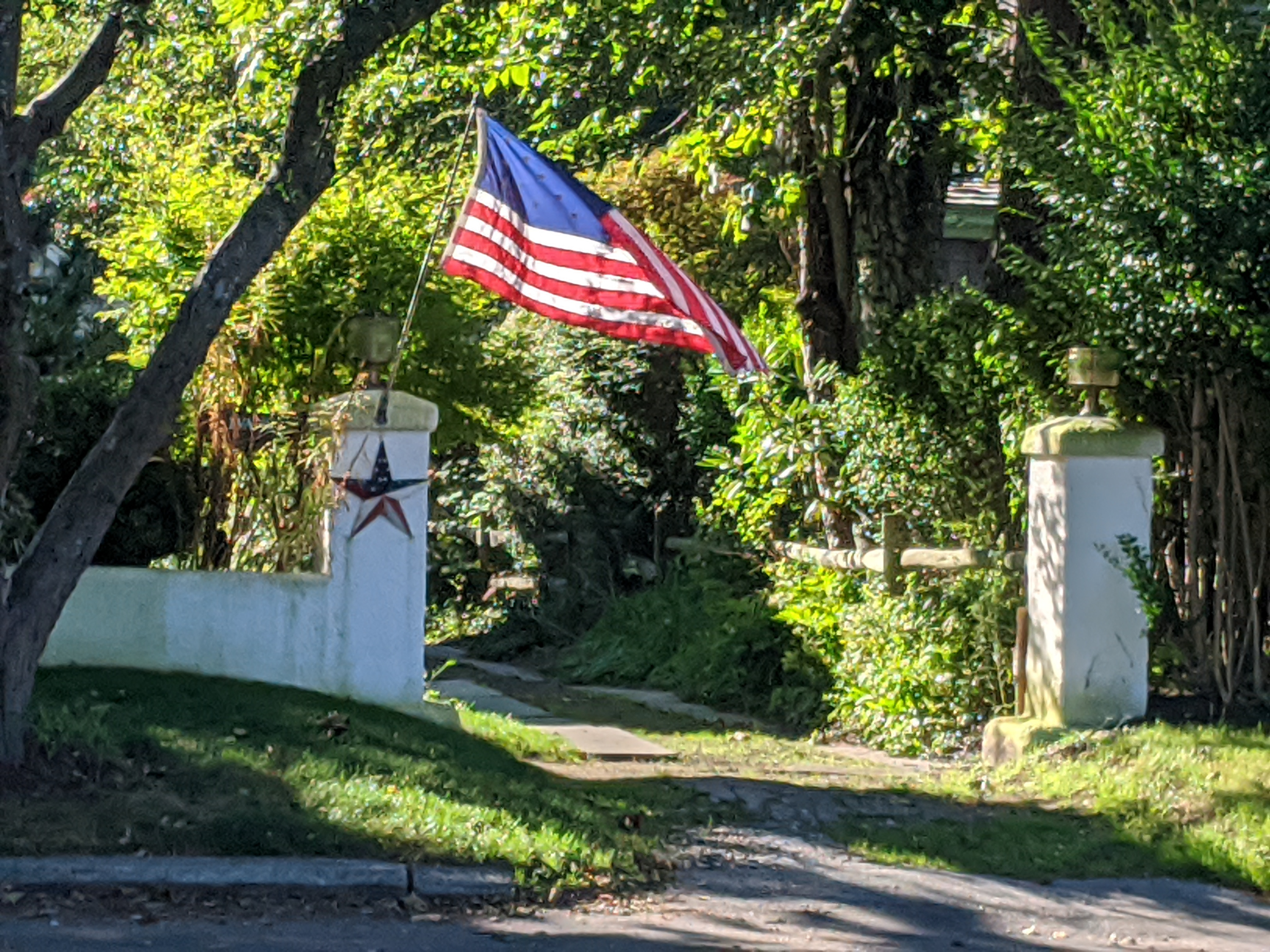
Old Fort 20200919 091036

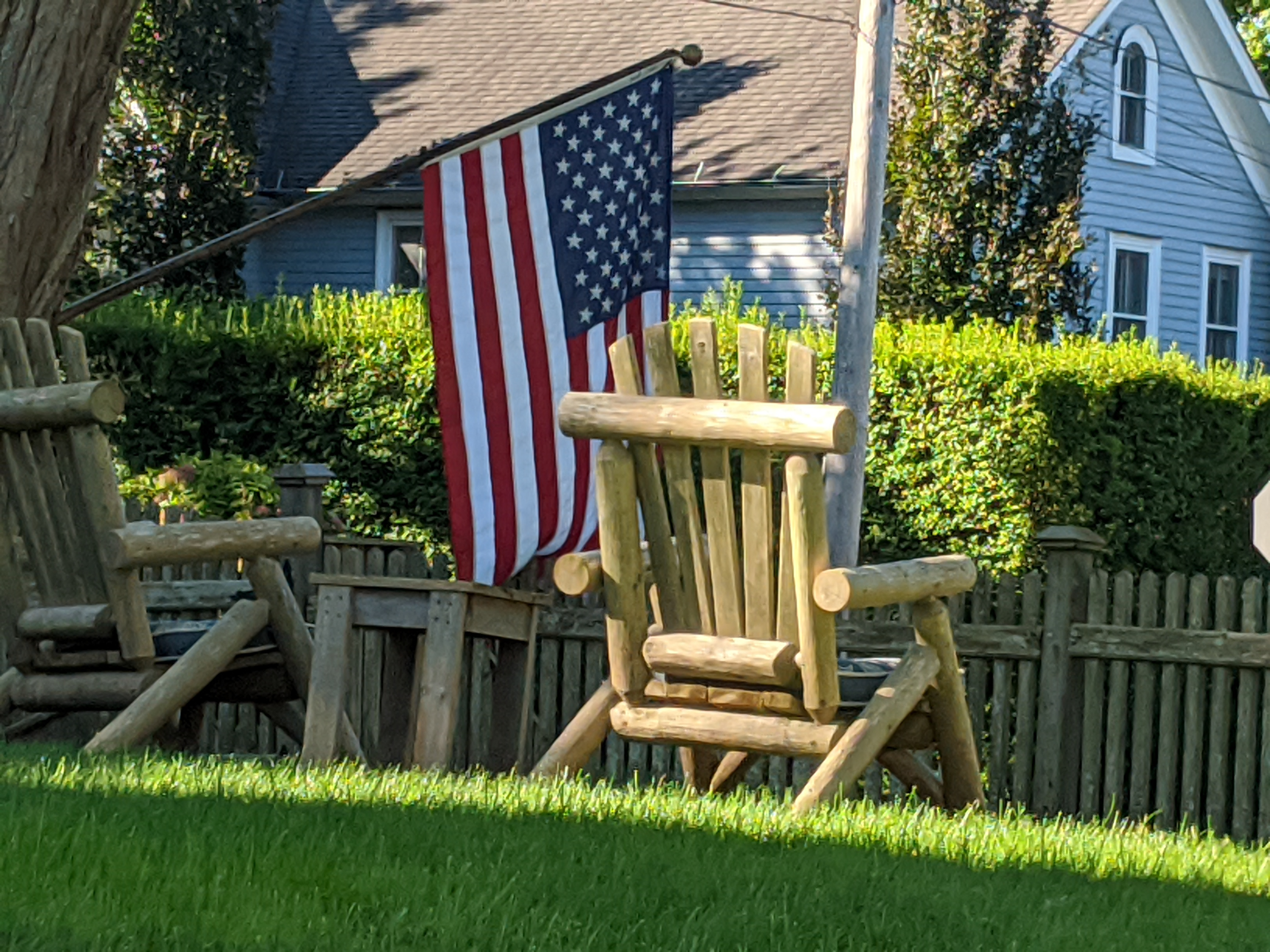
Old Fort flag 20200919 091246

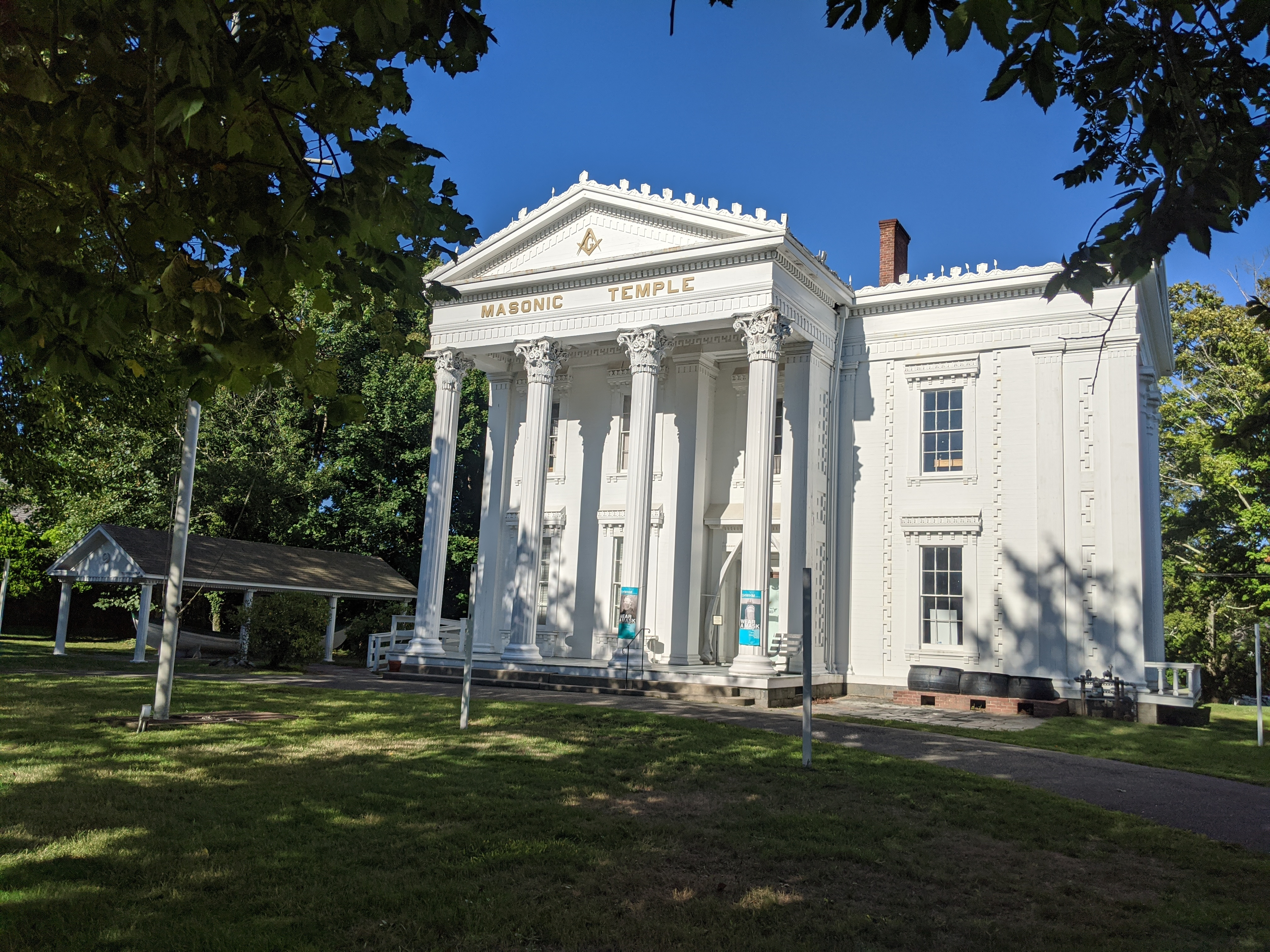
Masonic lodge 20200919 091622

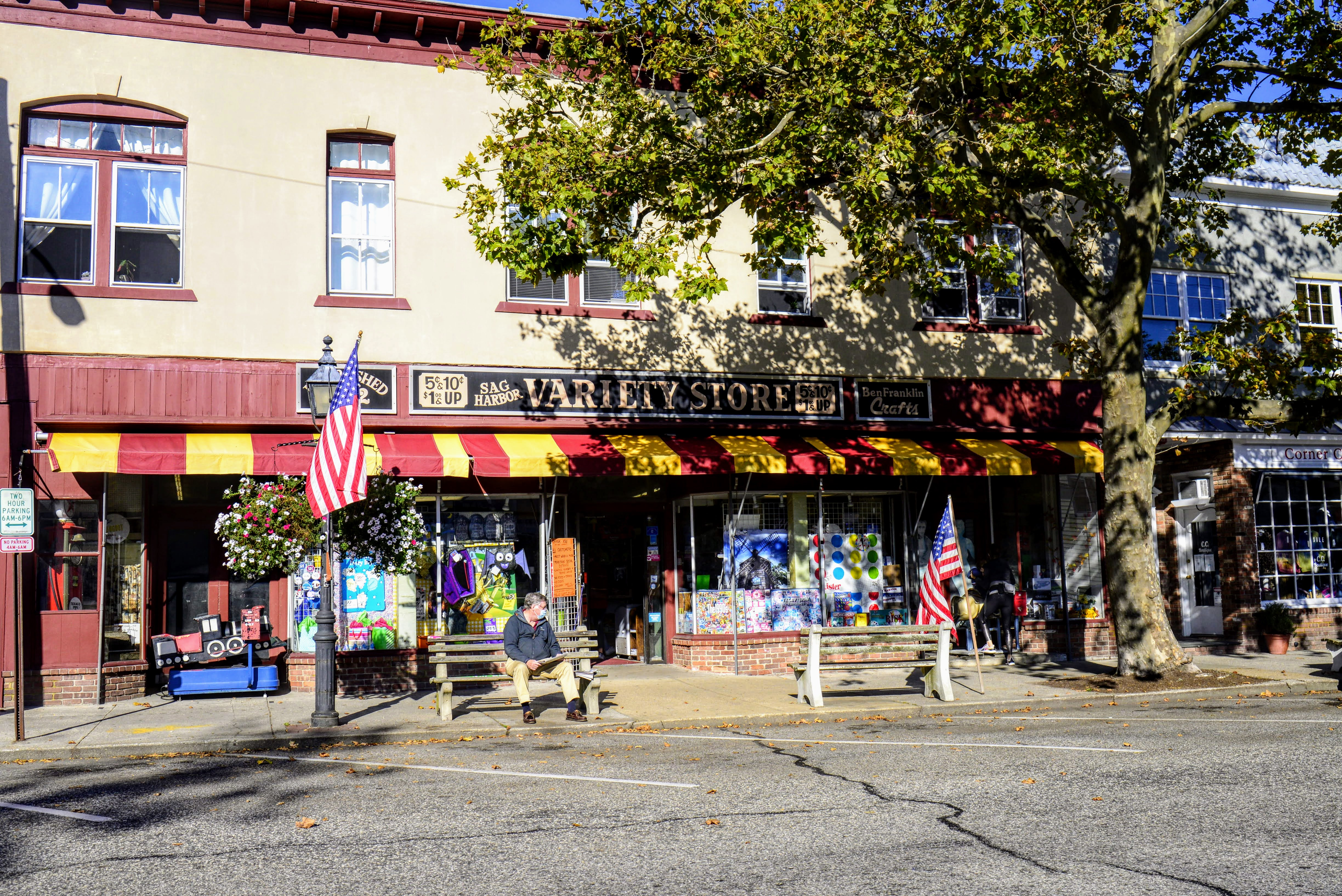
Variety Store

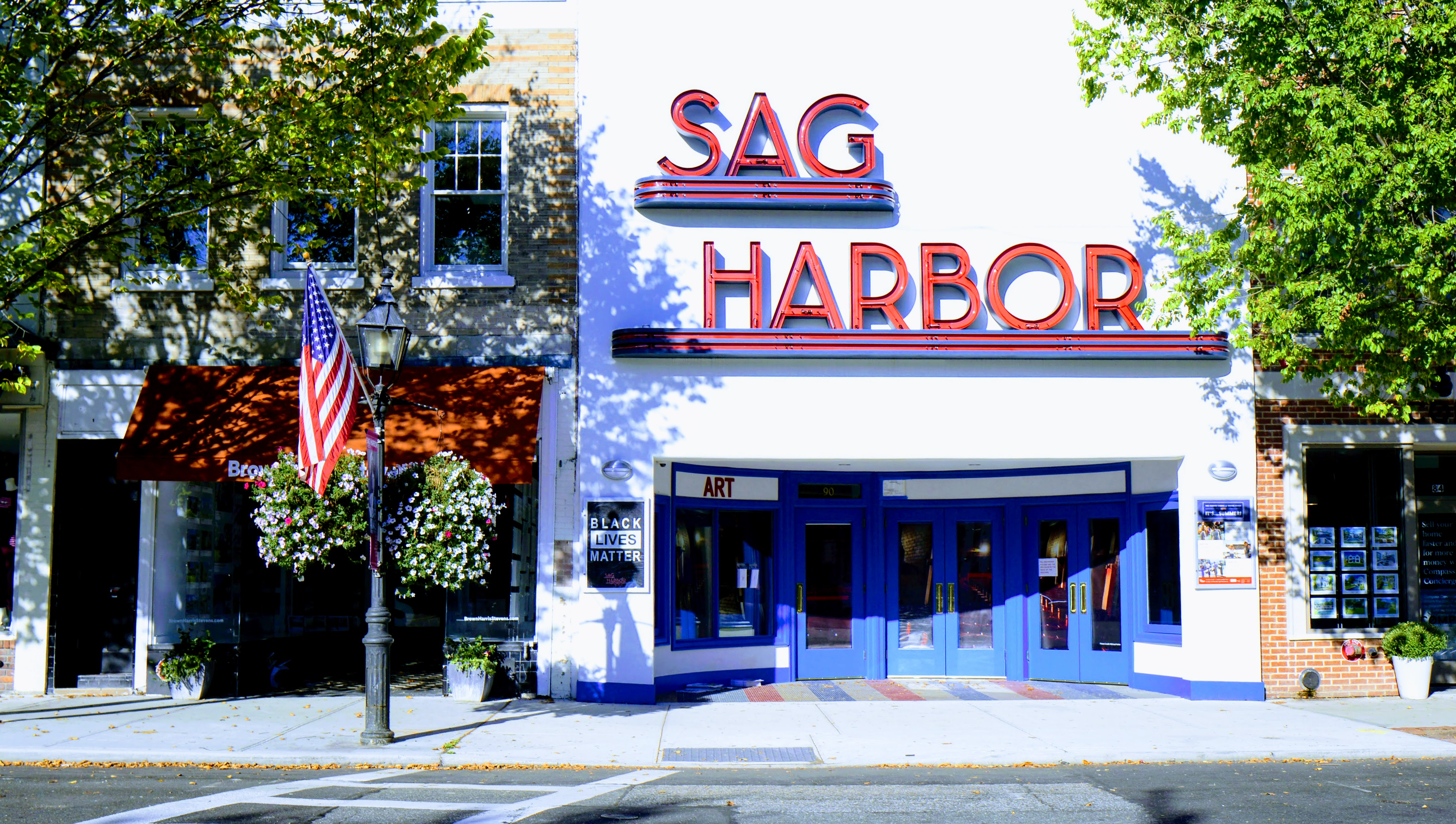
Sag Harbor Movie Theatre 2019

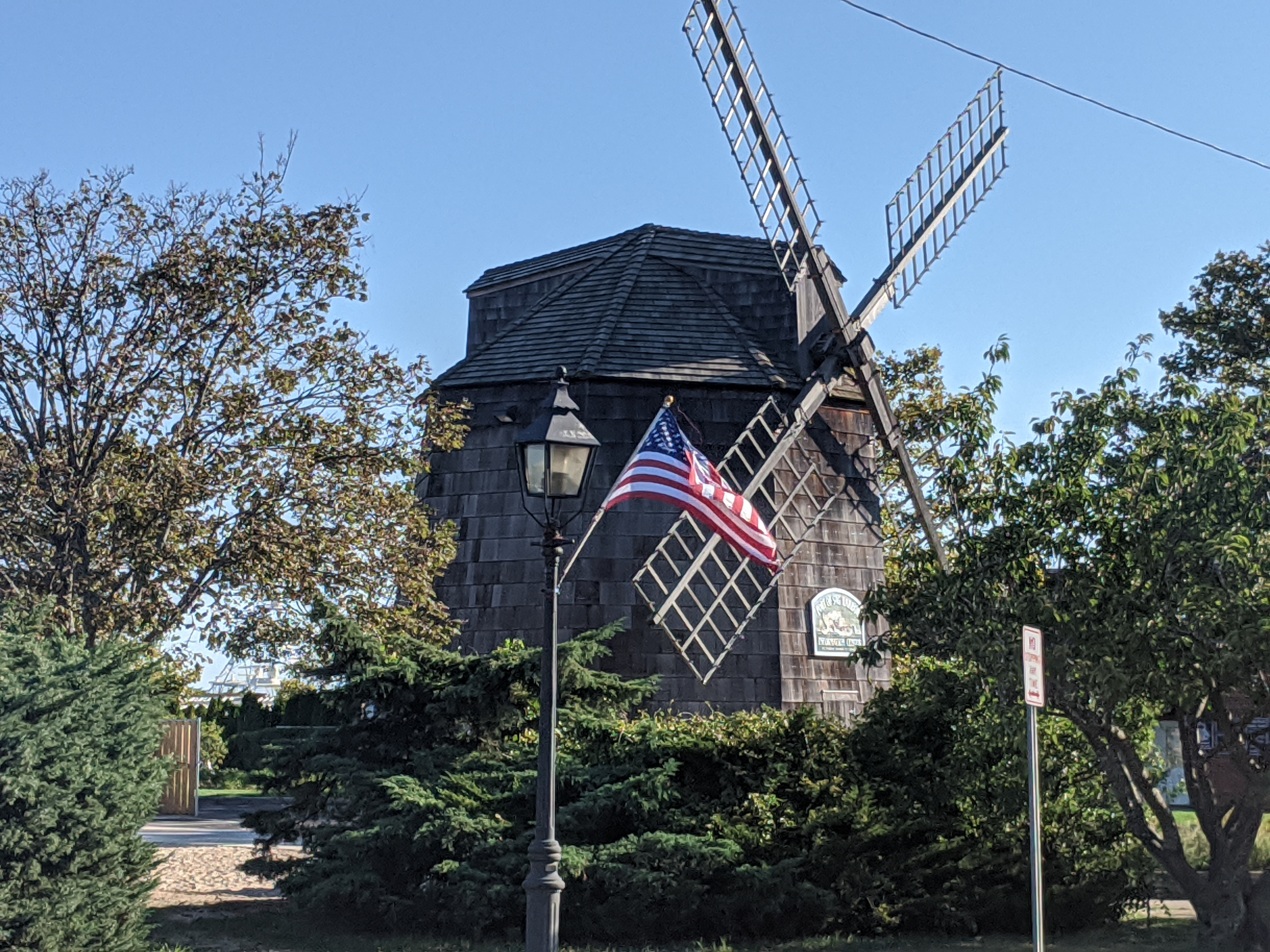
Beebe Mill replica on Long Wharf

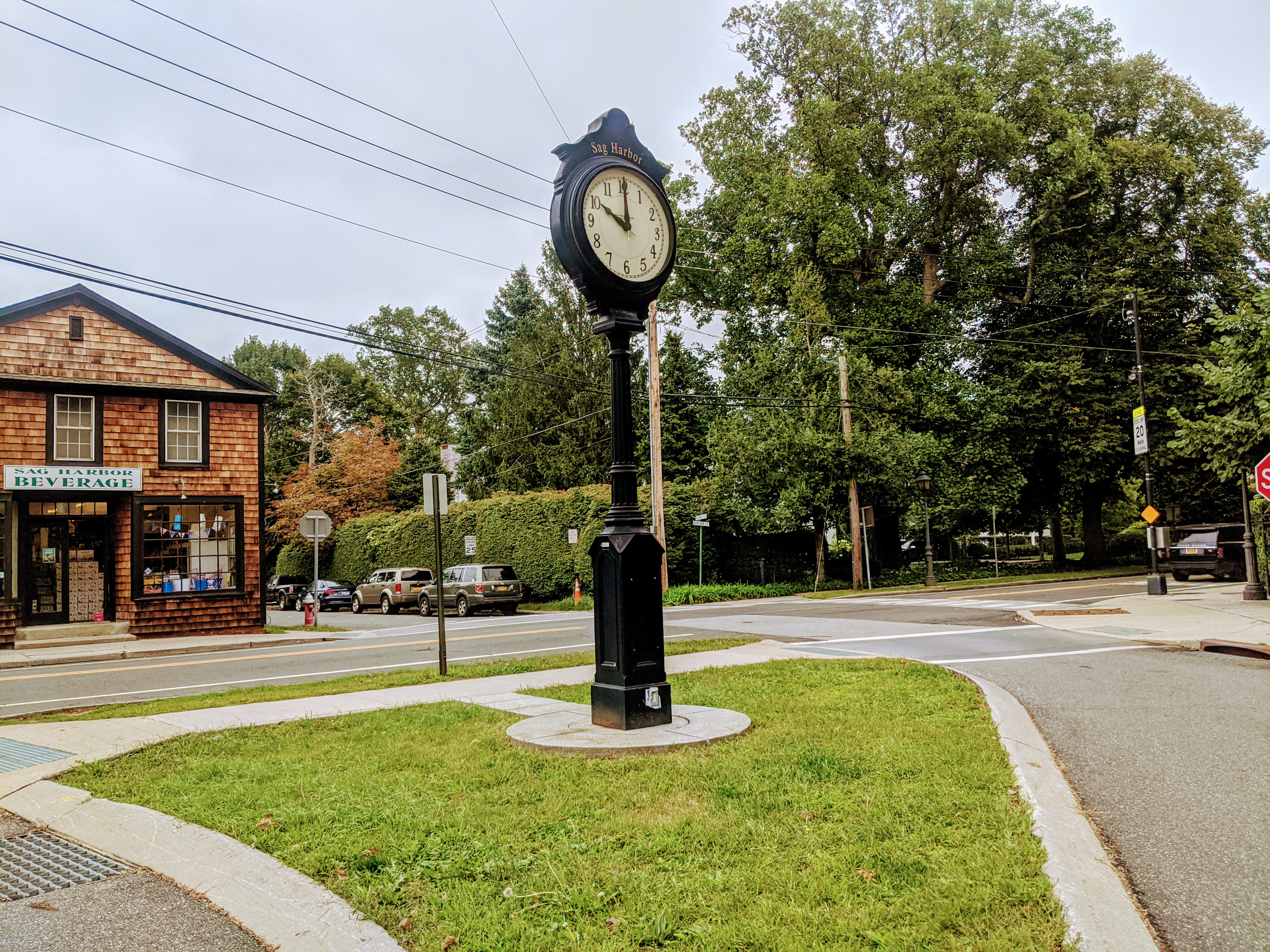
Sag Harbor clock

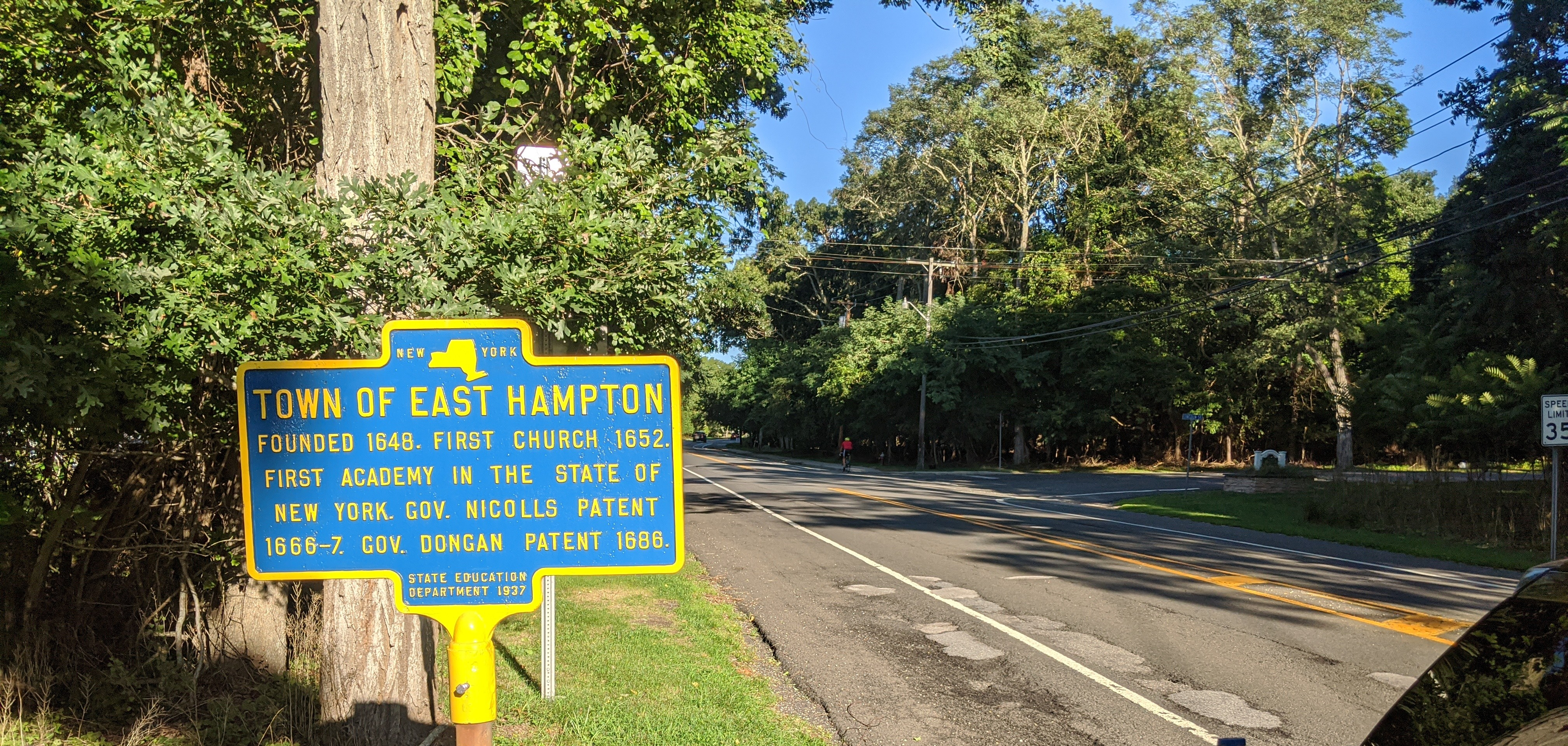
East Hampton historic marker

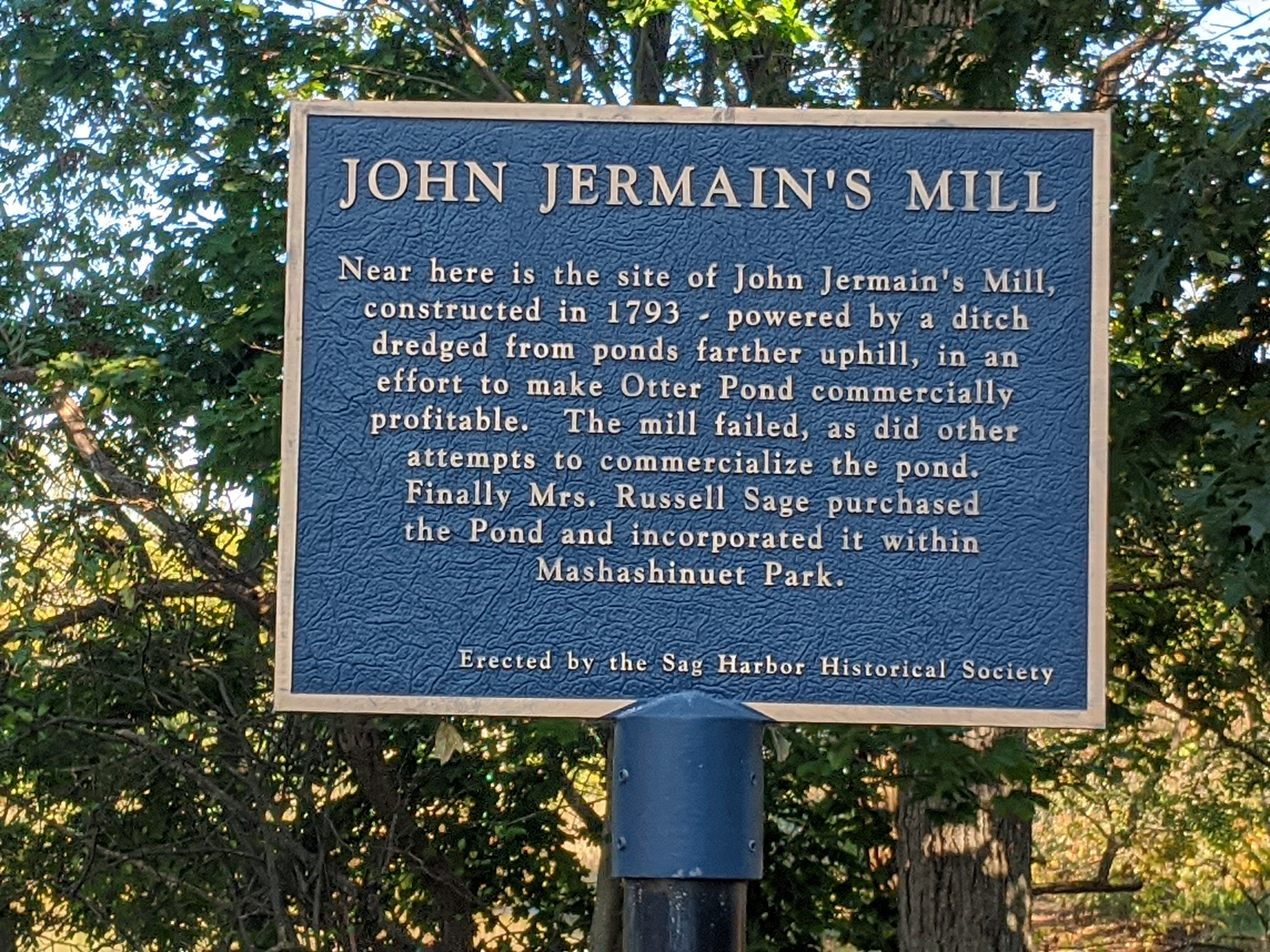
John Jermain mill historic marker at Otter pond

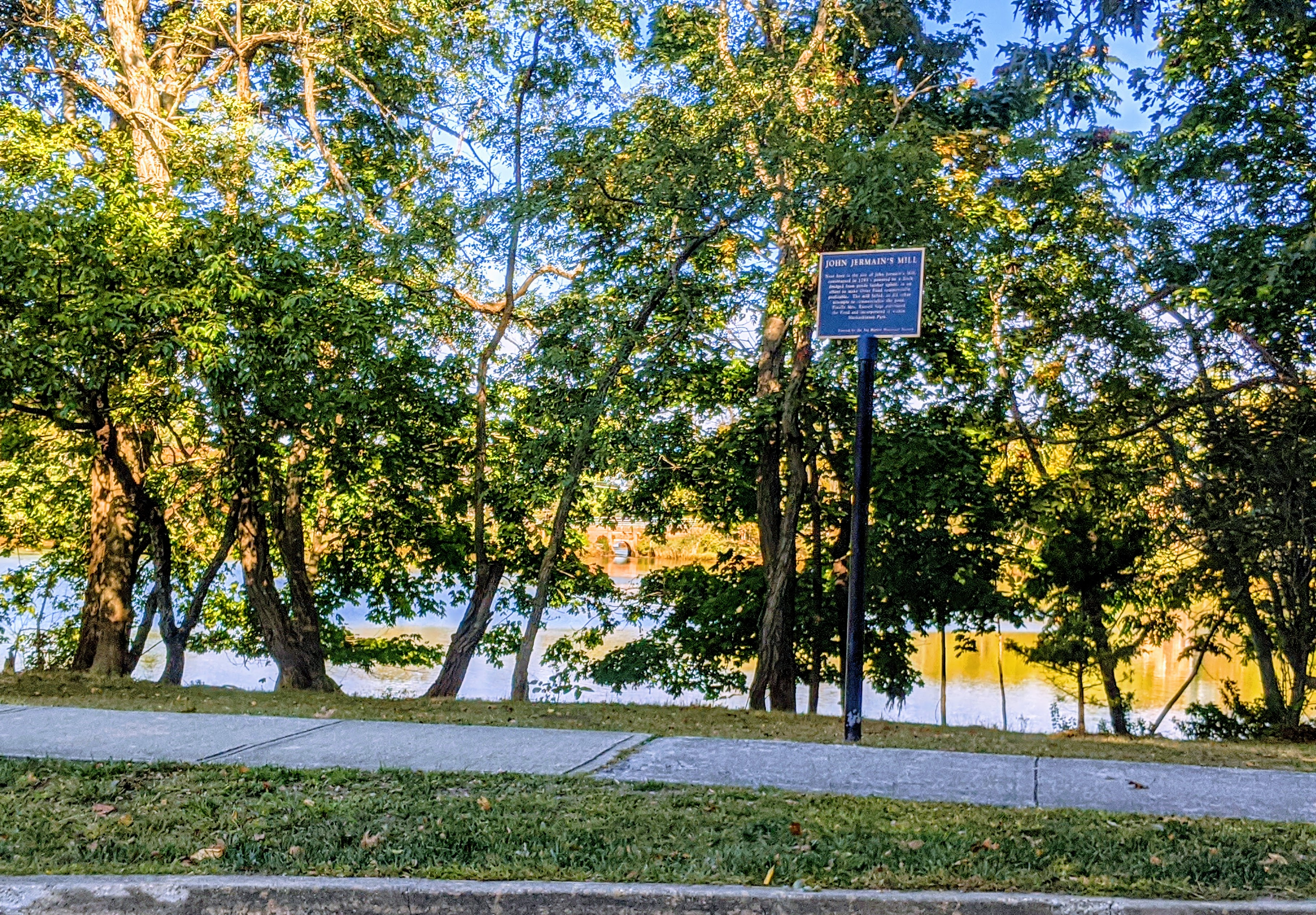
Contributing property in Sag Harbor - John Jermain mill historic marker at Otter pond

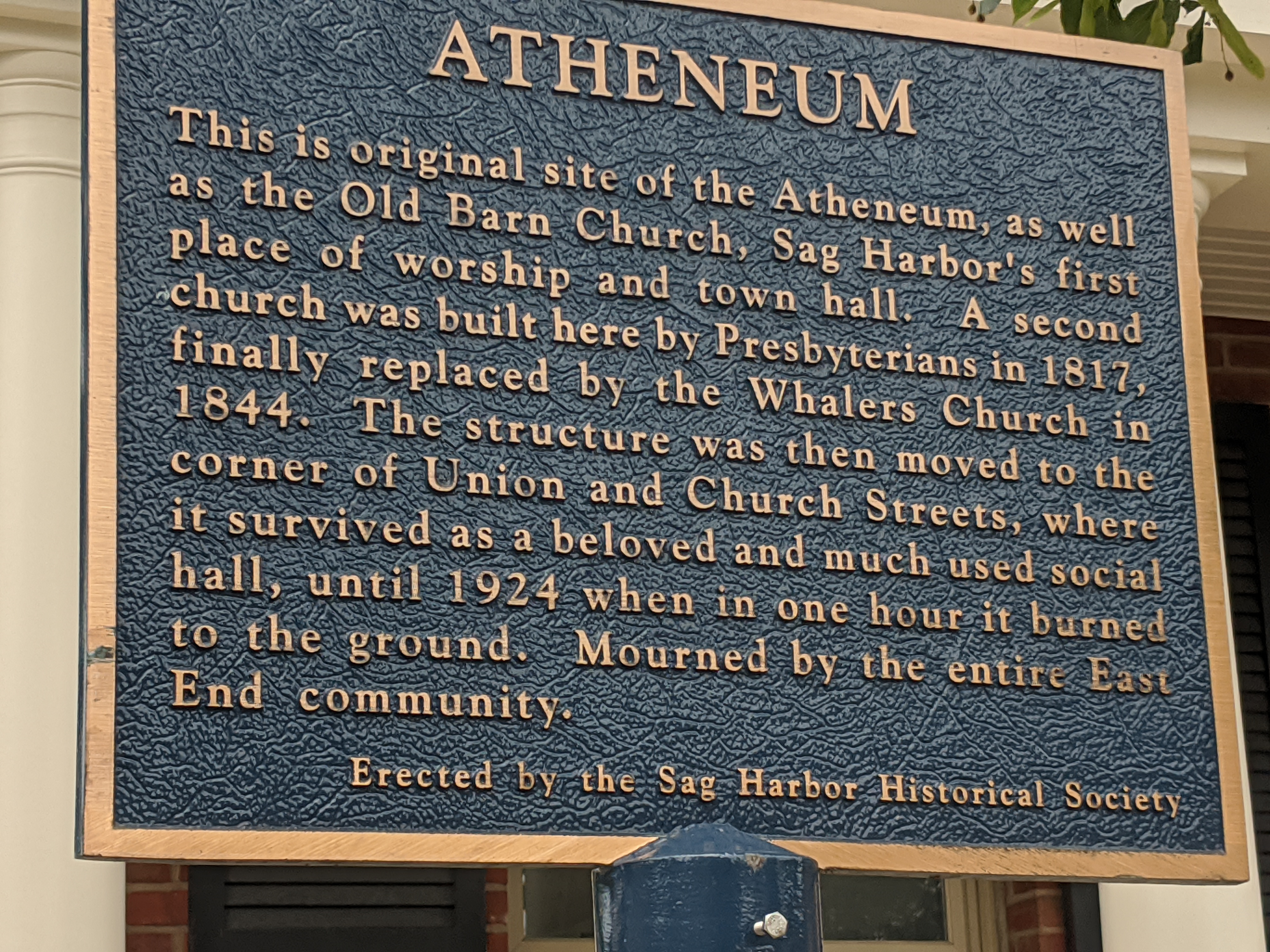
Atheneum Historical Marker 01

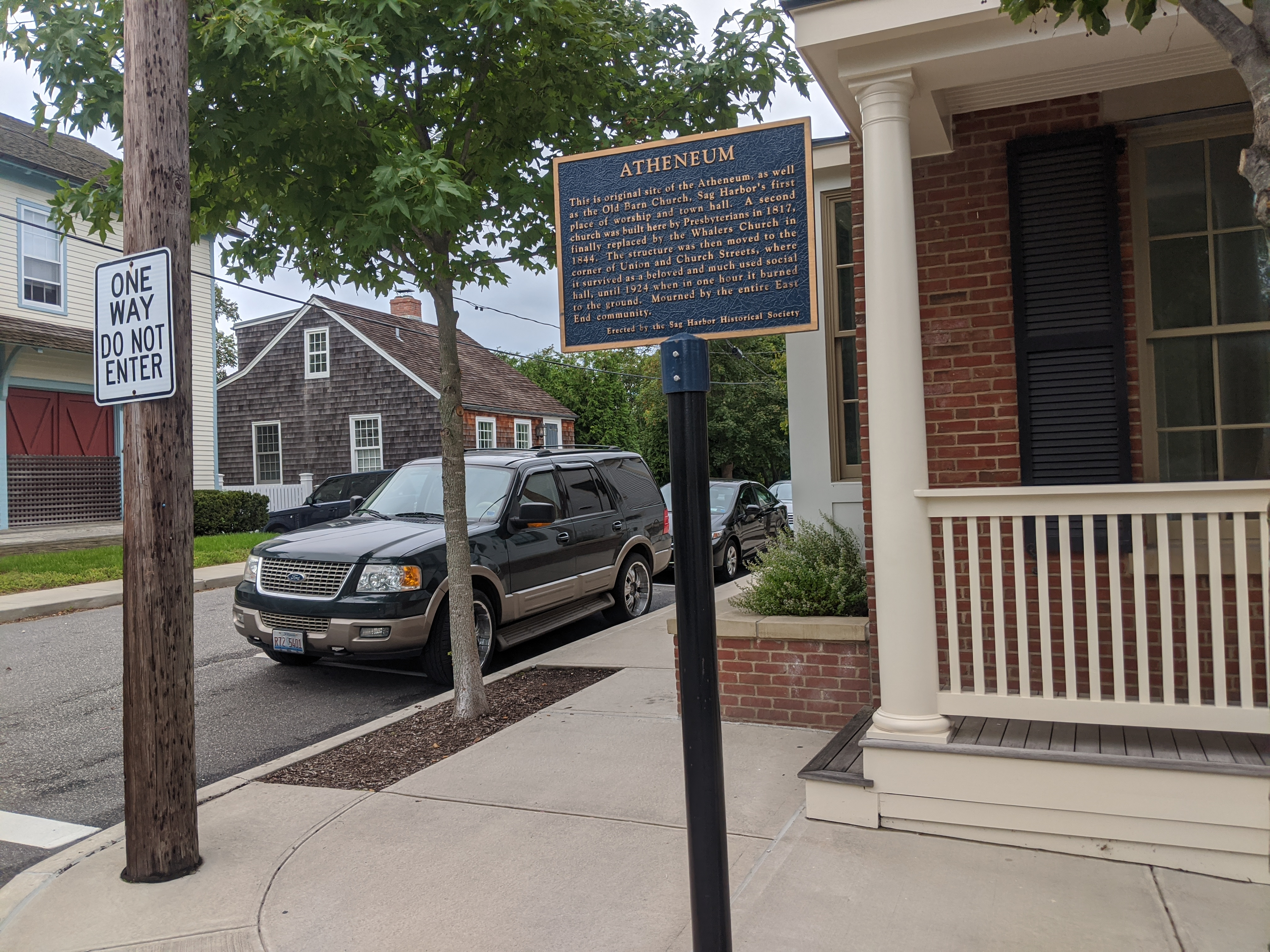
Atheneum Hist. marker 20200918 093006

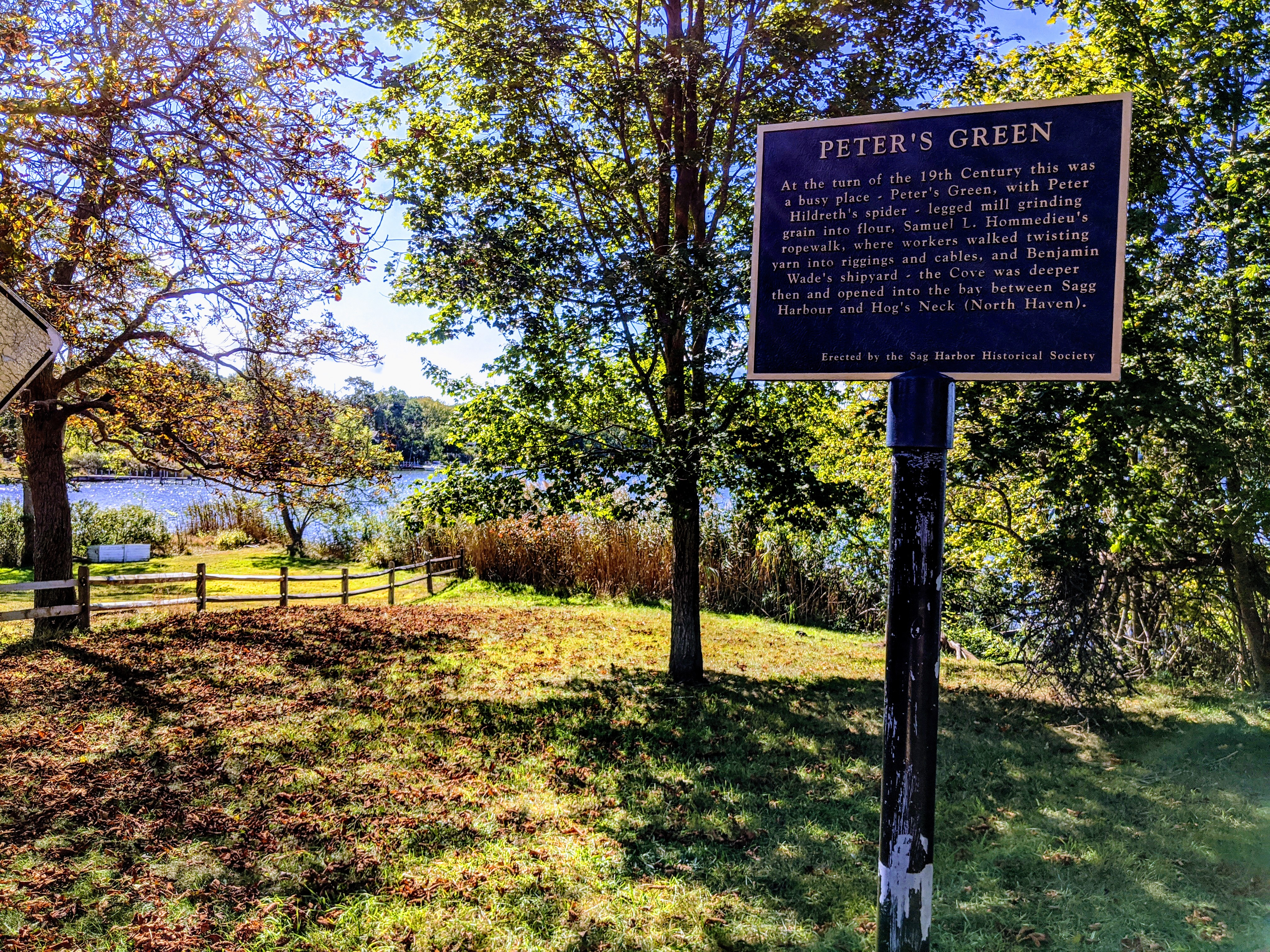
Peters green was a working cove and home to a spider legged mill

== See also ==
Sag Harbor Hills, Azurest, and Ninevah Beach Subdivisions Historic District
