= Ranald MacDonald =

First native English teacher in Japan (1824–1894)

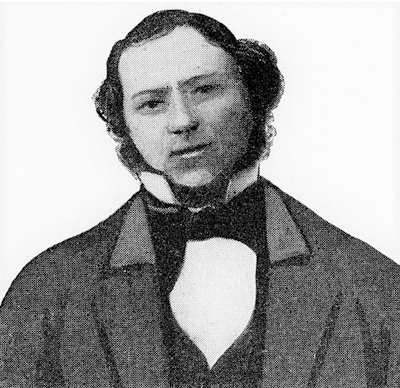
- Born: February 3, 1824; Fort Astoria, Columbia District, British North America
- Died: August 24, 1894 (aged 70); Washington, United States
- Resting place: Ranald McDonald Cemetery, Ferry County, Washington; 48°56′51″N 118°45′43″W
- Other name: Toole (Note: Referred to in his father's letters as Toole or Toole-Toole, supposedly from a Chinook word for 'bird'.)
- Known for: Visiting Japan before Commodore Perry's 'opening of Japan' and teaching English to Japanese interpreters.
- Parents: Archibald McDonald (father); Koale'xoa (mother)
- Relatives: Chief Comcomly (grandfather)

Ranald MacDonald (February 3, 1824 – August 24, 1894) was the first native English speaker to teach the English language in Japan. His students included Moriyama Einosuke, one of the chief interpreters in the negotiations between Commodore Perry and the Tokugawa Shogunate.

== Early life ==
MacDonald was born at Fort Astoria, in the Pacific Northwest of North America. The area was then known as the Columbia District or Oregon Country, disputed territory dominated by the British Hudson's Bay Company and the American Pacific Fur Company. MacDonald's father was Archibald McDonald, a Scottish Hudson's Bay Company fur trader. His mother was Koale'xoa (also known as Raven or Princess Sunday), a Chinook woman. Koale'xoa was the daughter of Comcomly, a leader of the "Lower Chinook" Chinookan people that lived near the present-day city of Ilwaco, Washington. However, Koale'xoa died shortly after giving birth and MacDonald was briefly cared for by his mother's family. Around 1825, Archibald McDonald married Jane Klyne, a Métis woman from Canada, and brought Ranald to Fort Vancouver, the headquarters of the Hudson's Bay Company. It is unclear when MacDonald became aware of the details of his birth or of his Chinook ancestry. MacDonald was a member of the larger Métis community.

Based on the popular historical fiction of Eva Emery Dye, it has been repeated that "as a child of eight in 1832 at Fort Vancouver, he met three shipwrecked Japanese sailors, including Otokichi". In reality the three shipwrecked Japanese sailors were brought to Fort Vancouver in July 1834 [not 1832], arriving there about four months after 10-yr-old Ranald MacDonald had departed for the Red River Colony – so there never was the fabled "meeting of East and West". MacDonald's First Nations relatives might have had legends that their ancestors had come from across the Pacific, but saying that MacDonald "developed a fascination with Japan" and "theorized that it might be the home of his distant relatives" may or may not be accurate. In his autobiography MacDonald explained it in his own words: "My plan was to present myself as a castaway ... and to rely on their humanity. My purpose was to learn of them; and, if occasion should offer, to instruct them of us."

MacDonald was educated at the Red River Academy in the newly established Red River Colony, a part of British North America that later became Manitoba, Canada. Later, following the wishes of his father, he secured a job as a bank clerk and became a Master Mason in St. Andres Lodge No. 516.

== Japan ==
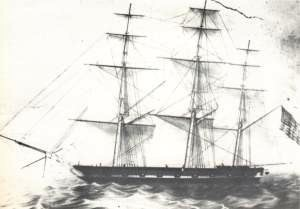
Captain James Glynn's sloop-of-war USS Preble, on which MacDonald returned from Japan.

A restless man, he soon quit his bank job and decided that he would visit Japan. Despite knowing the strict isolationist Japanese policy of the time, which meant death or imprisonment for foreigners who set foot on Japanese soil, he signed on as a sailor on the whaling ship Plymouth in 1845. In 1848, he convinced the captain of the Plymouth to set him to sea on a small boat off the coast of Hokkaidō. On July 1, he came ashore on Rishiri Island where he pretended he had been shipwrecked. He was caught by Ainu people, who remitted him to the daimyō of the Matsumae clan. In October, he was then sent to Nagasaki, the only port allowed to conduct limited trade with the Dutch.

Since more and more American and British ships had been approaching Japanese waters, and no man in Japan spoke English with any sort of fluency, fourteen men were sent to study English under MacDonald. These men were samurai, who had previously learned Dutch and had been attempting to learn English for some time from secondhand sources, such as Dutch merchants who spoke a little of the language. The brightest of these men, a sort of "language genius", was Moriyama Einosuke.

MacDonald stayed in confinement, at Daihian, a branch temple of the Sofuku-ji in Nagasaki, for 7 months, during which he also studied Japanese before being taken aboard a passing American warship. In April 1849, in Nagasaki, MacDonald was remitted together with fifteen shipwreck survivors to Captain James Glynn on the American warship USS Preble which had been sent to rescue stranded sailors. Glynn later urged that a treaty should be signed with Japan, "if not peaceably, then by force".

Upon his return to North America, MacDonald made a written declaration to the US Congress, explaining that the Japanese society was well policed, and the Japanese people were well behaved to the highest standard. He continued his career as a sailor.

After travelling widely, MacDonald returned to Canada East (now Quebec) and, in 1858, went to the new colony of British Columbia where he set up a packing business in the Fraser River gold fields and later in the Cariboo, in 1864. He also participated in the Vancouver Island Exploring Expedition.

Although his students had been instrumental in the negotiations to open Japan with Commodore Perry and Lord Elgin, MacDonald found no real recognition of his achievements. His notes of the Japanese adventure were not published until 1923, 29 years after his death. He died impoverished in Washington state in 1894, while visiting his niece. His last words were reportedly "Sayonara, my dear, sayonara..."

== Memorials and burial place ==
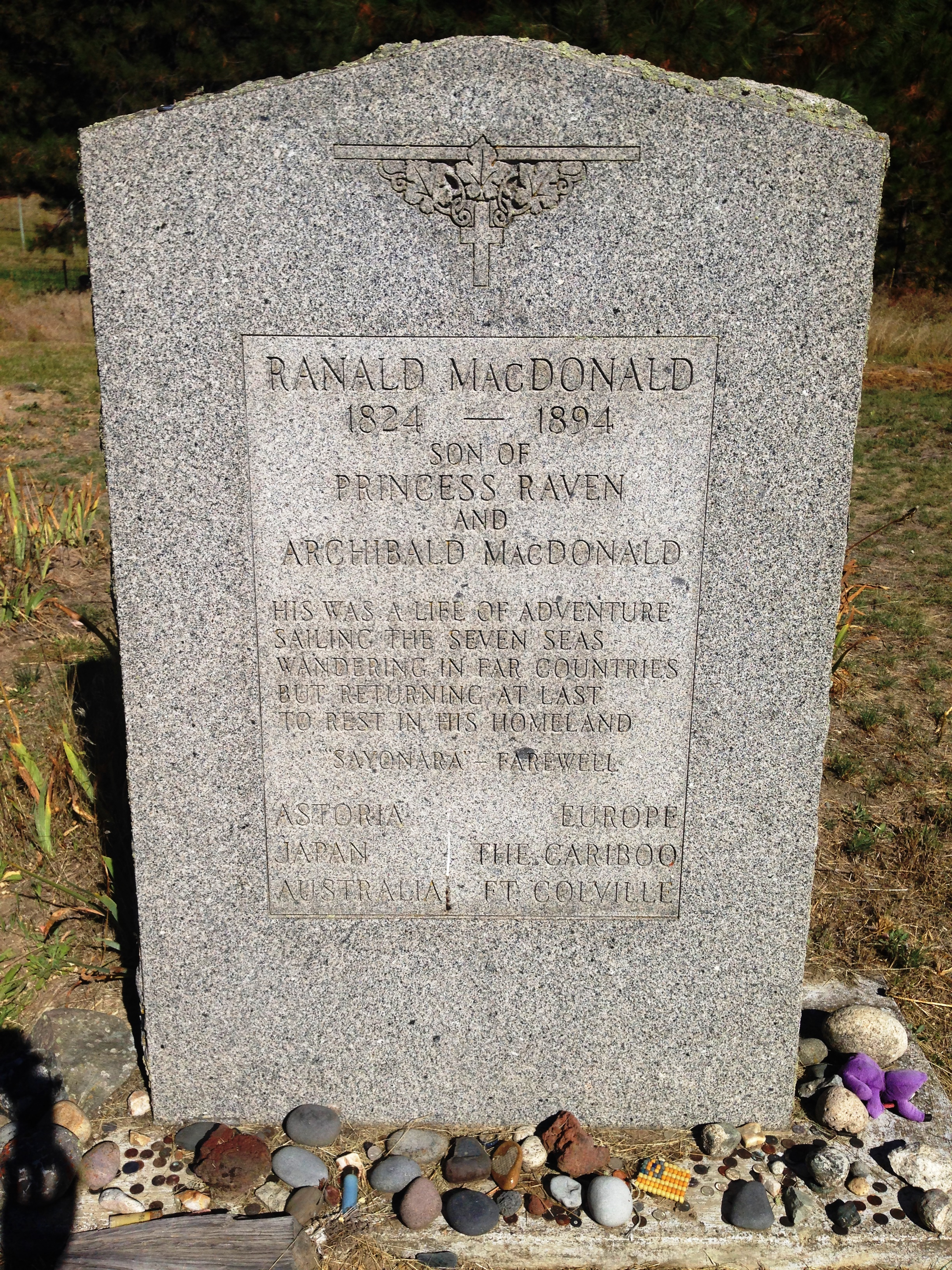
Ranald MacDonald headstone at cemetery in Ferry County, Washington state

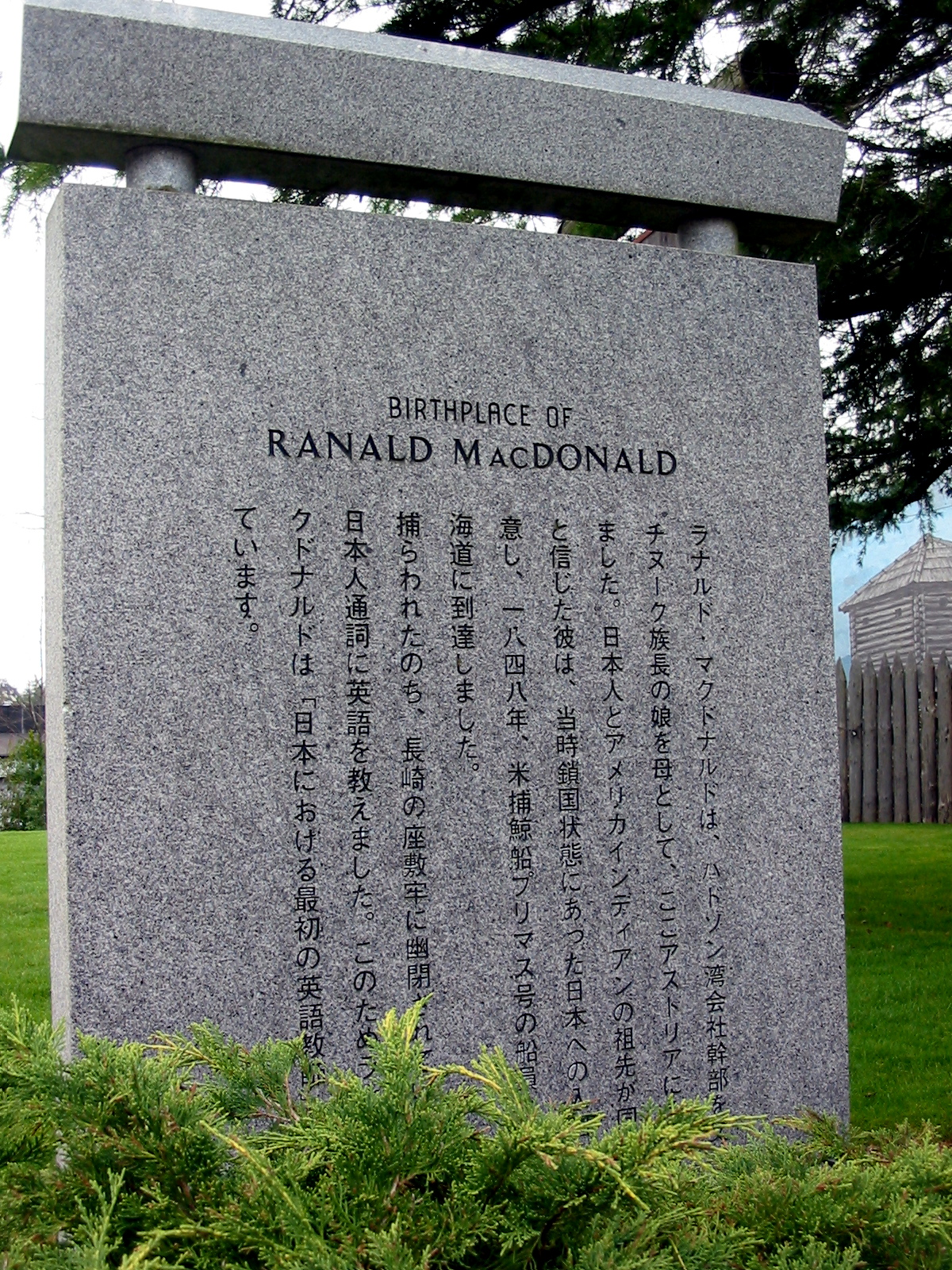
Japanese language monument indicating the birthplace of Ranald MacDonald in Astoria, Oregon

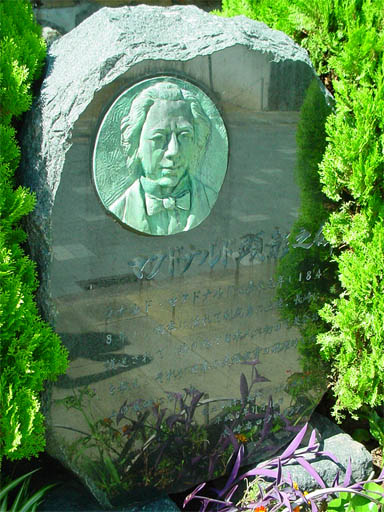
The monument to Ranald MacDonald in Nagasaki, Japan

MacDonald is buried in the Ranald MacDonald Cemetery, Ferry County, Washington. The grave is 18 miles (29 km) northwest of Curlew Lake State Park on Mid Way Road. The grave itself is a state park, the smallest in Washington State. The grave marker has the inscription:

RANALD MacDONALD 1824–1894
SON OF PRINCESS RAVEN AND ARCHIBALD MacDONALD
HIS WAS A LIFE OF ADVENTURE SAILING THE SEVEN SEAS
WANDERING IN FAR COUNTRIES BUT RETURNING AT LAST TO REST IN HIS HOMELAND. "SAYONARA" – FAREWELL
ASTORIA EUROPE JAPAN THE CARIBOO AUSTRALIA FT COLVILLE

There are memorials to Ranald MacDonald in Rishiri Island and in Nagasaki, as well as in his birthplace, where Fort Astoria used to stand in Astoria, Oregon.

== Award ==
Since 2016, the foundation Friends of MacDonald - The Dutch Connection in the Netherlands has given out the Ranald MacDonald Award to writers/artists who shed new light on the relations between Asia, Europe and North America with their work. Some of the people who won this award are: Frederik L. Schodt (2016), Zia Haider Rahman (2016), Hajime Narukawa (2017), Bruno Maçães (2018) and the FENIX Landverhuizersmuseum in Rotterdam (2019).
