= Mercator Cooper =

American whaler (1803–1872)

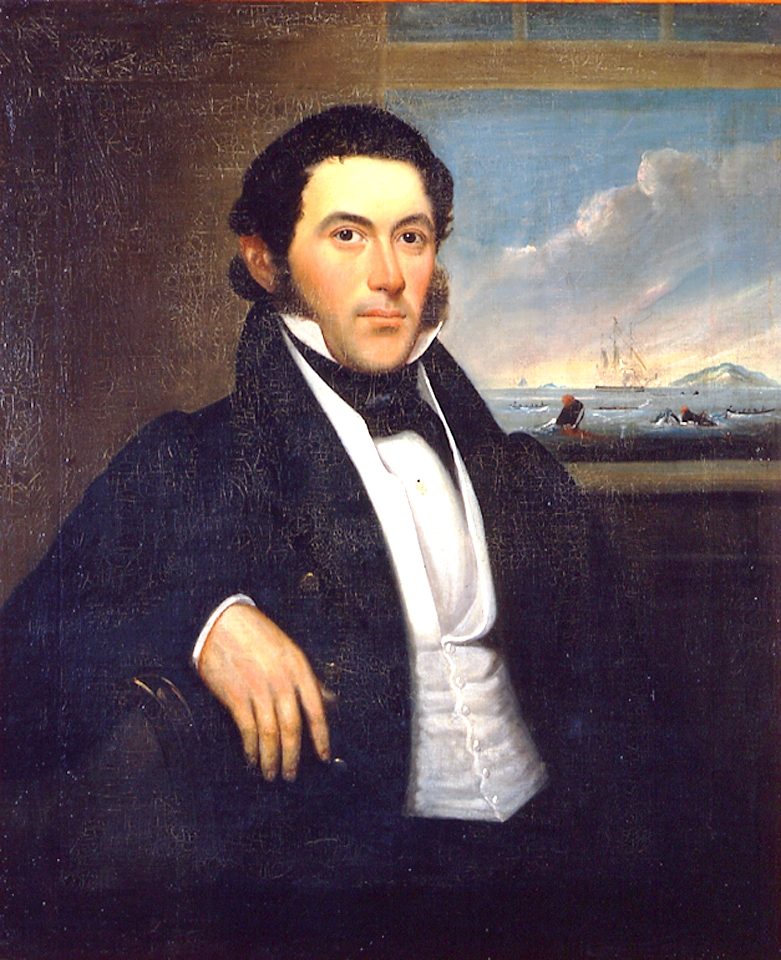
- Painting of Mercator Cooper from the mid-1830s
- Born: September 29, 1803
- Died: 1872 (aged 68–69)

Mercator Cooper (September 29, 1803 – March 23 or April 24, 1872) was a ship's captain who is credited with the first formal American visit near Edo (now Tokyo), Japan and the first formal landing on the mainland East Antarctica.

Both events occurred while sailing ships out of Sag Harbor, New York.

== Early life ==
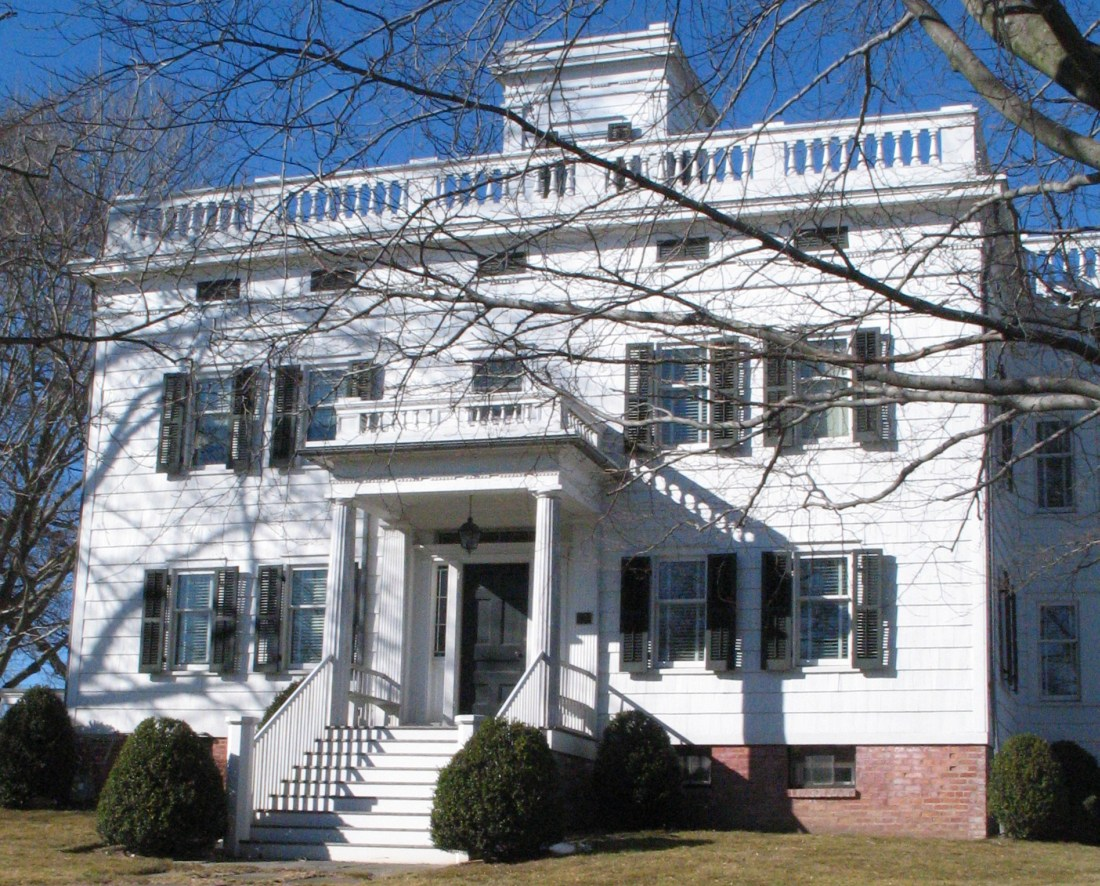
Mercator Cooper House in Southampton (now used as part of the town library).

Cooper was born in Southampton, New York, to Nathan and Olive (née Howell) Cooper, one of five children, three of whom survived to adulthood. He went to sea on a whaling vessel in the early 1820s. Records show that he visited Guangdong (China) and Patagonia (South America) on whaling expeditions, and that he became captain of a ship in 1832.

He married Maria Green at the age of 24, and they had three children: Nathan (died in infancy), Maria, and Sarah.

== Visit of the Manhattan to Japan ==
On November 9, 1843, Cooper left Sag Harbor as captain of the 440-ton ship Manhattan on a whaling voyage. It was about the first of April 1845 when Captain Cooper passed by the neighborhood of St. Peters (a small island lying a few degrees to the S. E of Japan) to the northern ocean for whaling. When Captain Cooper was exploring the shore to hunt turtles, he met 11 Japanese sailors on the coast who had been shipwrecked on St. Peters many months ago. He took them to the shore, showed them his vessel, and informed them he would take them back to Jeddo if they trusted him. Captain Mercator Cooper decided to take them to Jeddo, although there was a clear rule published by Japanese court prohibiting foreigners from going to Japan. After Captain Cooper left St. Peters and sailed a day or two en route to Japan, he found a wrecked vessel on the ocean. This ship was from a port in Northern Japan and was initially shipping pickled salmon to Jeddo. Captain Cooper saved 11 more sailors from this ship and made sail again for the shores of Japan.

The Manhattan set sail for Edo to repatriate the sailors. Outside Edo Bay four of the survivors took a Japanese boat with a message that Cooper wanted to deliver the remainder to the harbor. The Japanese normally wanted to avoid contact with outsiders due to the Tokugawa shogunate's official policy of national isolation. However, on April 18, 1845, an emissary from the shogunate gave the ship permission to proceed. "About three hundred Japanese boats with about 15 men in each took the ship in tow", according to Cooper's log. "They took all our arms out to keep till we left. There were several of the nobility came on board to see the ship. They appeared very friendly." (Note: Mary Cummings, the head researcher at the Southampton Historical Museums, the head researcher at the Southampton Historical Museum, provided this information: Our information says 4. Charles A. Jagger wrote an account in the first issue of The Southampton Magazine, Spring 1912. He wrote that he had based the article on three sources: an account printed in a Hawaiian newspaper by a missionary who interviewed Capt. Cooper in Hawaii a few weeks after he had left Japan; the Captain's own log book; and the recollections and traditions of families and friends of the men who had sailed with Capt. Cooper. Here's the sentence: "When numbers of Japanese craft approached, the Captain put four of the refugees aboard one of the craft, with directions to notify the powerful Shogun of Yedo of his intention to enter Yedo Bay." Posted by Bill Bleyer, author of the Newsday article cited.) Moriyama (The student of Ranald MacDonald) was an interpreter on the occasion of Capt. Mercator Cooper’s visit to Japan in 1845, he translated the government orders to the Captain into English.

Japanese accounts place the anchorage of Manhattan at Uraga, at the mouth of Tokyo Bay. It had been over 220 years since so many foreigners had been so close to the Japanese metropolis, but no one from the vessel was permitted to actually land in Japan.

The Japanese examined his ship and took particular note of Pyrrhus Concer, a crewman from Southampton, Long Island, who was the only African American on board, and of a Shinnecock Native American named Eleazar. They were the first dark skinned men the Japanese had seen and they wanted to touch their skin. The interpreter from the Japanese side was Moriyama Einosuke, who would later serve during the Perry Expedition.

The Japanese refused payment for provisions and gave the ship water, 20 sacks of rice, two sacks of wheat, a box of flour, 11 sacks of sweet potatoes, 50 fowl, two cords of wood, radishes and 10 pounds of tea, and a set of lacquer bowls for the captain, together with a letter from the Shogun. They thanked the Manhattan's crew for returning the shipwrecked sailors and told them to never return, not even to bring back more castaways, on pain of death. On April 21, 500 small boats towed the Manhattan 20 miles out to sea.

Cooper took with him the map that charted the islands of Japan that had been found on the disabled Japanese ship. This is now located in the New Bedford Whaling Museum. News of Cooper's encounter was extensively publicized in the United States. Matthew Perry was said to have used the map on his visit to Japan on July 8, 1853.

Cooper's home in Southampton is now owned by the Rogers Memorial Library. Pyrrhus Concer is buried in the North End Cemetery in Southampton across from Cooper's home.

== First visitor to Antarctica ==
In August 1851, Cooper again left Sag Harbor, this time as captain of the 382-ton ship Levant (Note: There was also a sloop at this time called the USS Levant, but this was a different vessel.) on a mixed whaling and sealing voyage. Making a quick passage through the belt of pack ice in the Ross Sea, on January 26, 1853, he sighted land, an ice shelf backed by a high mountain some 70 to 100 miles (110 to 160 km) distant. The next morning, the ice shelf still in sight, with high mountains looming behind it, he sailed the ship close inshore and ordered a boat to be lowered. They made a landing on the ice shelf, reportedly seeing numerous penguins, but no seals – their chief objective. The landing occurred on what is now known as the Oates Coast of Victoria Land, in East Antarctica. It is arguably "the first adequately documented continental landing" in not only this area, but on the mainland of Antarctica itself. They stayed within sight of land for several days, sighting the Balleny Islands on February 2. At the conclusion of the voyage the Levant was sold in China.

The logbook from the voyage is in the Long Island Room of the East Hampton Library in East Hampton (village), New York.

== Death ==
Cooper died in Barranquilla, Colombia, South America. His date of death is sometimes reported as March 23, 1872, or April 24, 1872.
