= Red River Academy (Manitoba) =

The Red River Academy (later St. John's College) in Manitoba, Canada, was established for the training and education of the sons of Hudson's Bay Company employees. It was founded in 1852 by Rev. David Jones. Many of the students were Indigenous. It was located in the Red River Colony.

== Students ==
- Ranald MacDonald
- James McKay Jr.
- Angus McKay
- Thomas Bunn
