= Bruno Maçães =

Portuguese philosopher, journalist, politician, consultant and author

Maçães in 2026

Bruno Maçães (born 1974) is a Portuguese political scientist, politician, consultant and author. From 2013 to 2015, he served as Secretary of State for European Affairs in the Portuguese government. As of 2026, he is a columnist for the New Statesman, a member of the European Council on Foreign Relations, and also a member of the Advisory Council for the Brussels Institute of Geopolitics. He has introduced a number of new concepts in contemporary politics, such as Eurasian dialectics, virtualism, world building, and civilisation state.

== Education ==
Maçães studied law at the University of Lisbon and political science at Harvard University, where he wrote his doctoral dissertation under Harvey Mansfield.

== Career ==
From 2006 to 2007, Maçães was Professor in International Political Economy at Yonsei University in Seoul, South Korea. In 2008 he worked for the American Enterprise Institute. From June 2011 to March 2013, he served as a political advisor to Portuguese Prime Minister Pedro Passos Coelho. His tenure as Secretary of State for European Affairs in Portugal took place during the country's financial crisis. In 2013, the main Greek newspaper wrote that he was very German in his economic views. He told an audience in London that Germany has a "hypocritical" view of trade negotiations. He was described by Wolfgang Munchau as "reinventing the wheel" after tabling a number of proposals for eurozone reform.

In April 2014, Maçães defended an energy pact between the United States and Europe to face the Russian threat. His strategy was to create an energy revolution and move Europe to the Atlantic. Also in 2014, he was the first Western politician to visit Mariupol as it remained under Russian attack. Maçães left the government in November 2015. He was a senior fellow at Carnegie Europe, the Hudson Institute and Renmin University in Beijing.

== Works ==
He is the author of seven books: Dawn of Eurasia: On the Trail of the New World Order, Belt and Road: A Chinese World Order, History Has Begun: The Birth of a New America, Geopolitics for the End Time: From the Pandemic to the Climate Crisis, and World Builders. In Maçães's view, China's Belt and Road Initiative is the world's first transnational industrial policy as it goes beyond national policy to influence the industrial policy of other states. His book The Dawn of Eurasia, published by Penguin in January 2018, argued that the distinction between Europe and Asia had disappeared.

In 2018, The Dawn of Eurasia was granted the international Ranald MacDonald Award. His book History Has Begun describes a theory of "virtualism". Geopolitics for the End Time was reviewed by Paul Krugman in the New York Review of Books. In 2025, Maçães wrote World Builders: Technology and the New Geopolitics in which he argues that artificial intelligence will reshape 21st century geopolitical struggles. The book was reviewed by G. John Ikenberry in Foreign Affairs. His 2025 political manifesto Exit from Our Age of Disorder: with Lessons from Ibn Khaldun calls for replacing concepts of world order with concepts of world ordering. In 2026, he published In Search of Greater India, a book which explores the concept of India as a "civilization state".
