= Sag Harbor, New York =

- Village
- Incorporated Village of Sag Harbor
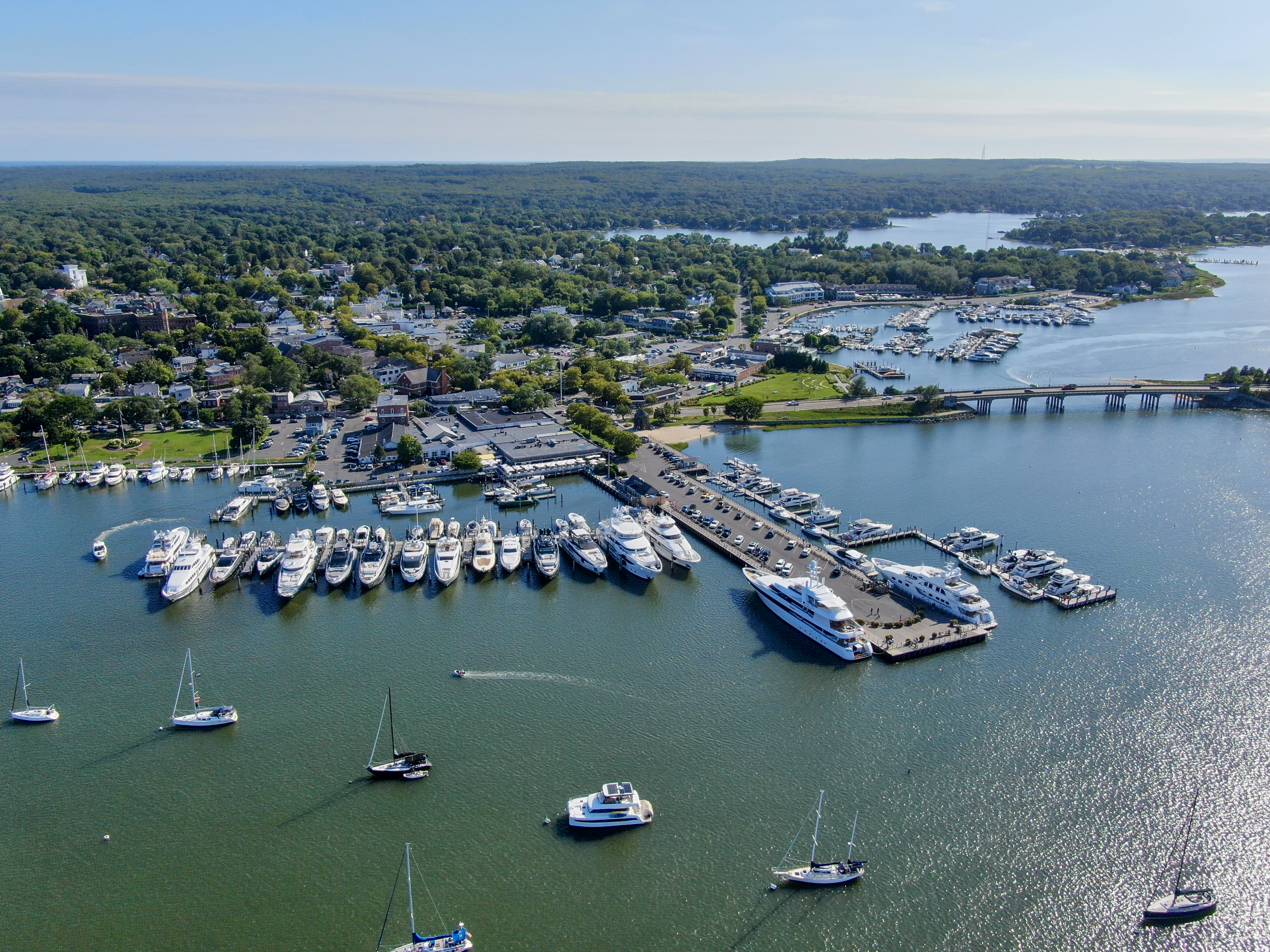
- Aerial view of the village in 2025

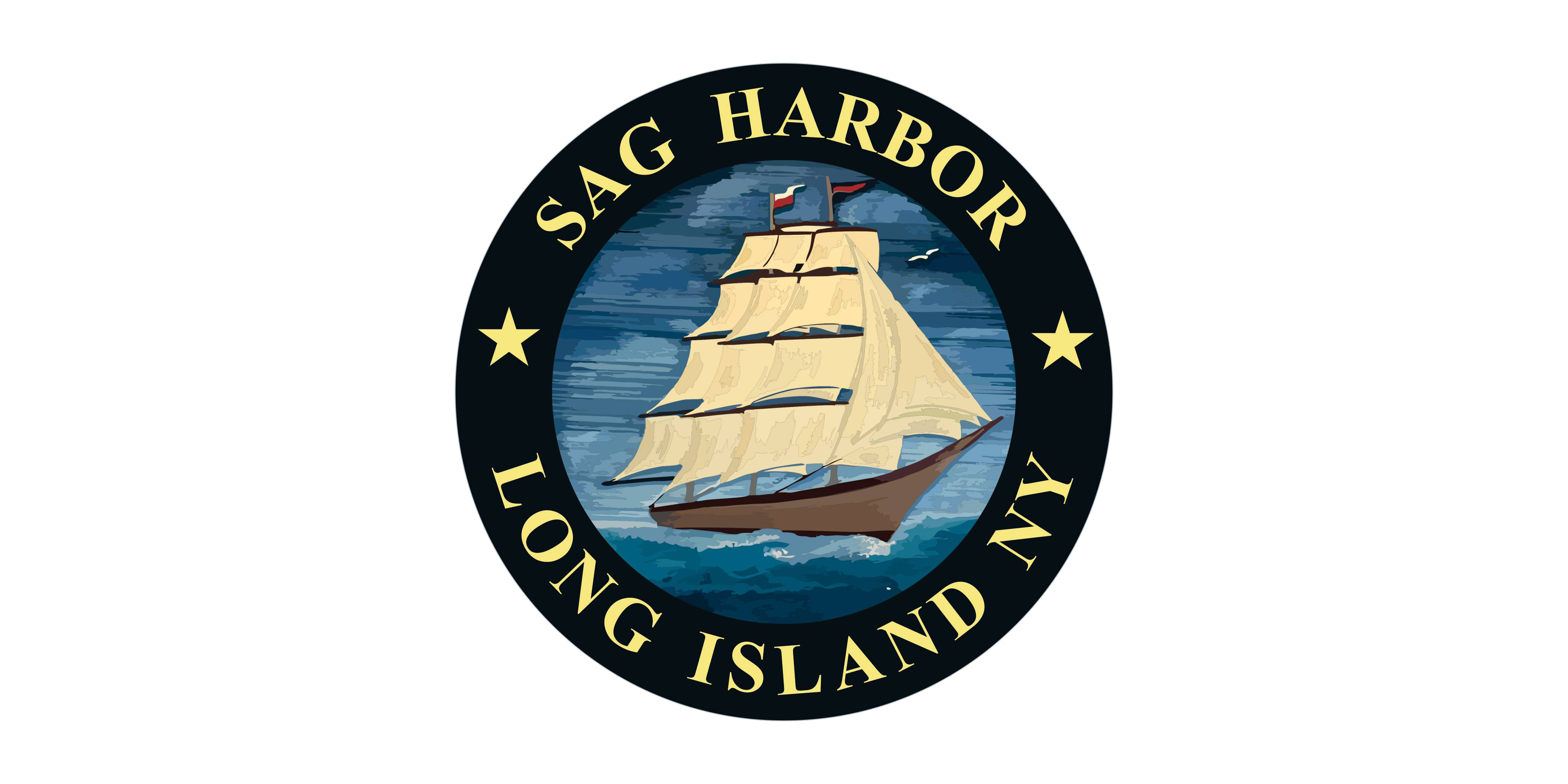
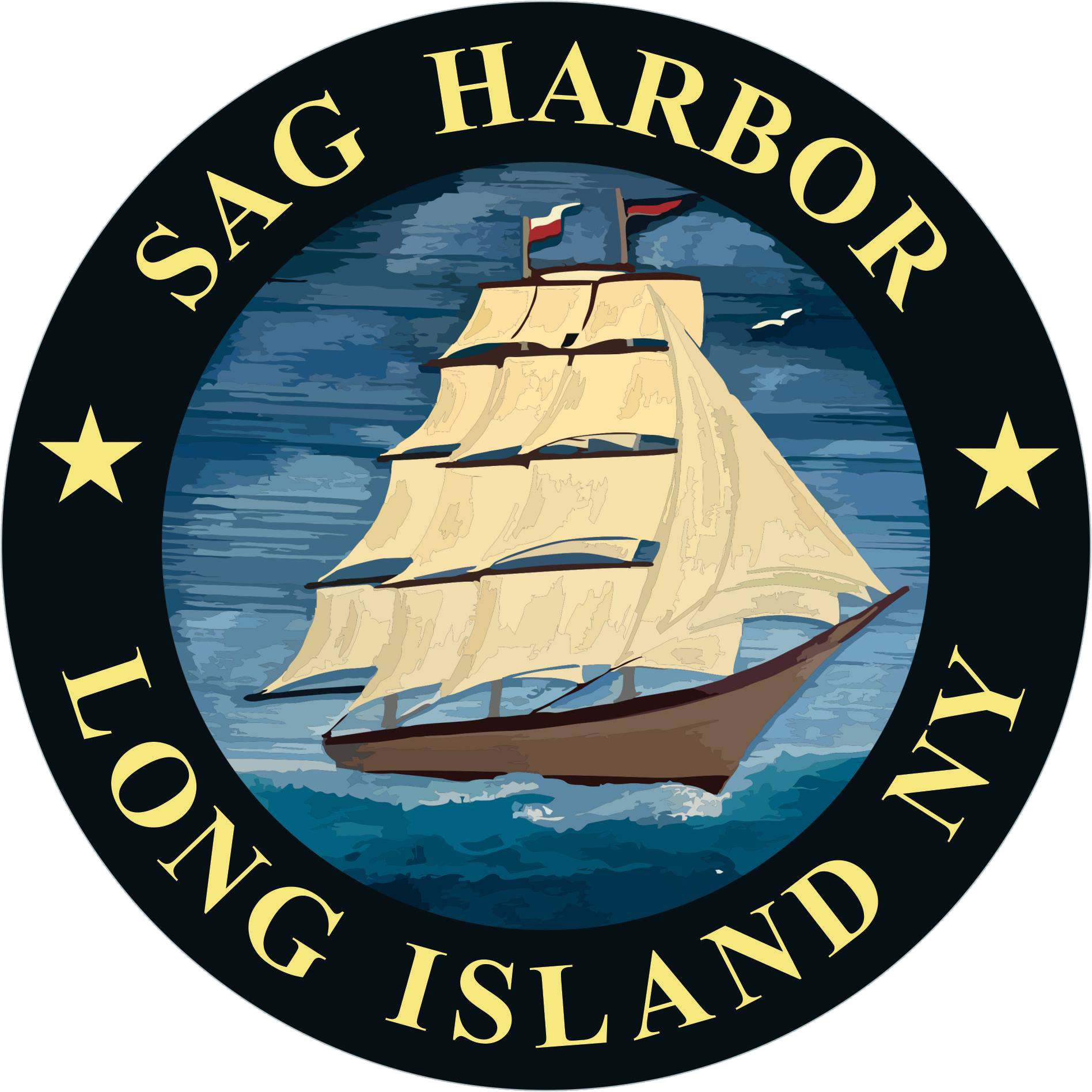
- Flag Seal

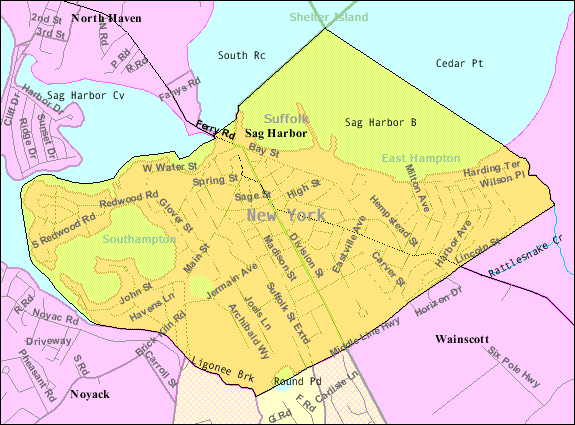

- Location on Long Island Location within the state of New York
- Coordinates: 41°0′N 72°18′W
- Country: United States
- State: New York
- County: Suffolk
- Town: East Hampton Southampton
- Incorporated: March 26, 1846

Area
  - Total: 1.81 sq mi (4.68 km^{2})
  - Land: 1.79 sq mi (4.63 km^{2})
  - Water: 0.019 sq mi (0.05 km^{2})
- Elevation: 26 ft (8 m)

Population (2020)
  - Total: 2,772
  - Density: 1,550.9/sq mi (598.79/km^{2})
- Time zone: UTC−5 (Eastern (EST))
  - Summer (DST): UTC−4 (EDT)
- ZIP Code: 11963
- Area codes: 631, 934
- FIPS code: 36-64485
- GNIS feature ID: 0963216
- Website: sagharborny.gov

Sag Harbor is an incorporated village in Suffolk County, New York, United States, in the towns of Southampton and East Hampton on eastern Long Island. The village developed as a working port on Gardiners Bay. The population was 2,772 at the time of the 2020 census.

The entire business district is listed as the historic Sag Harbor Village District on the National Register of Historic Places. A major whaling and shipping port in the 19th century, by the end of this period and in the 20th century, it became a destination for wealthy people who summered there.

Sag Harbor is about three-fifths in Southampton and two-fifths in East Hampton; the town boundary being Division Street. Its landmarks include structures associated with whaling and its early days when it was designated as the first port of entry to the new United States. It had the first United States custom house erected on Long Island.

== History ==
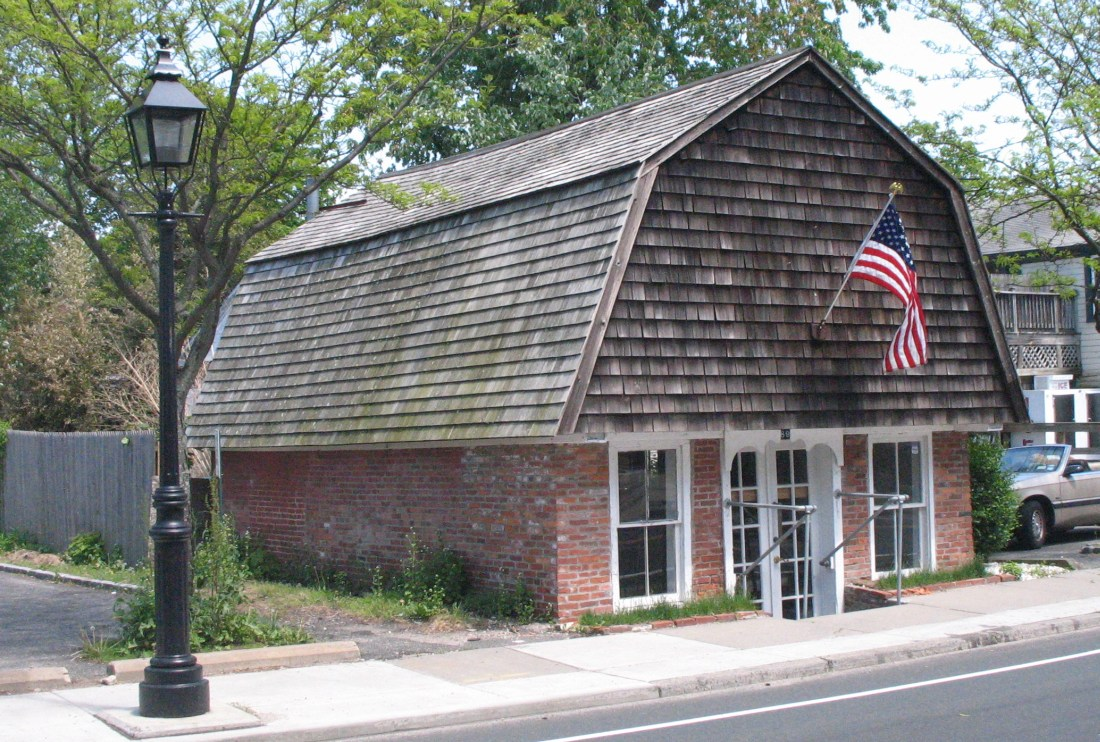
Umbrella House – the oldest extant house in Sag Harbor – housed British troops during the American Revolution. It was hit by cannon fire during the War of 1812.

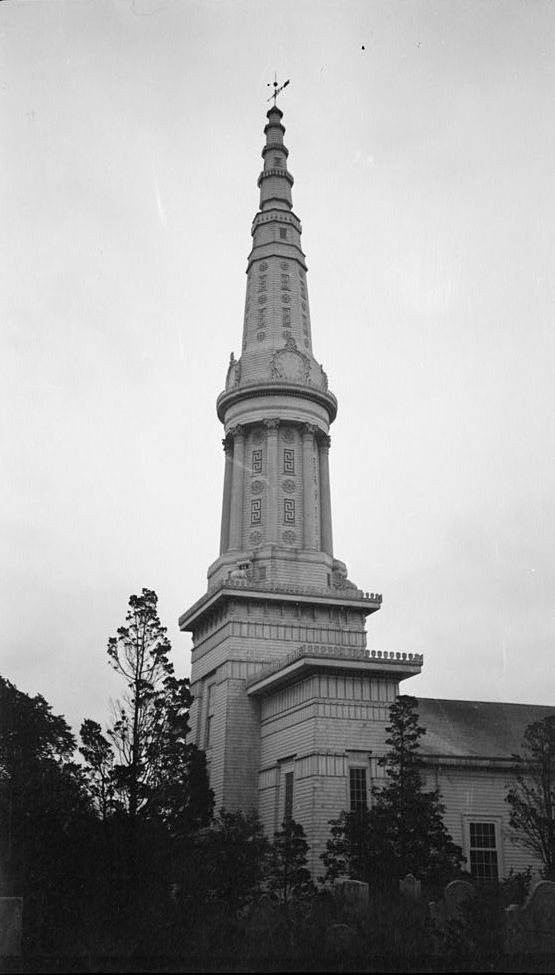
Old Whaler's Church with the 185-foot Egyptian revival steeple intact. The steeple was destroyed in a 1938 hurricane and has yet to be restored.

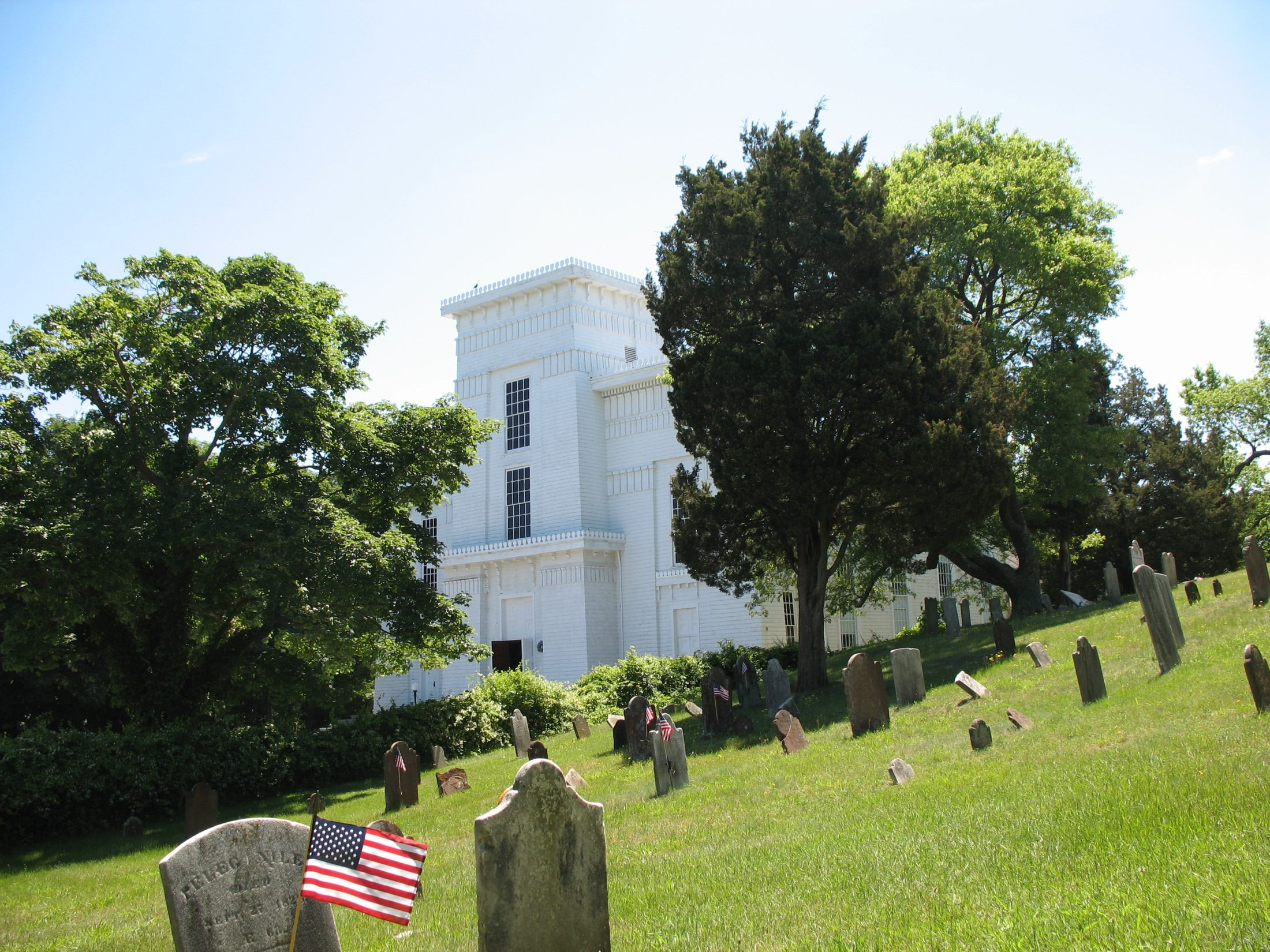
Old Whaler's Church and Old Burial Ground. The burial ground is the former site of a British fort that was attacked by Patriots in Meigs Raid during the Revolutionary War.

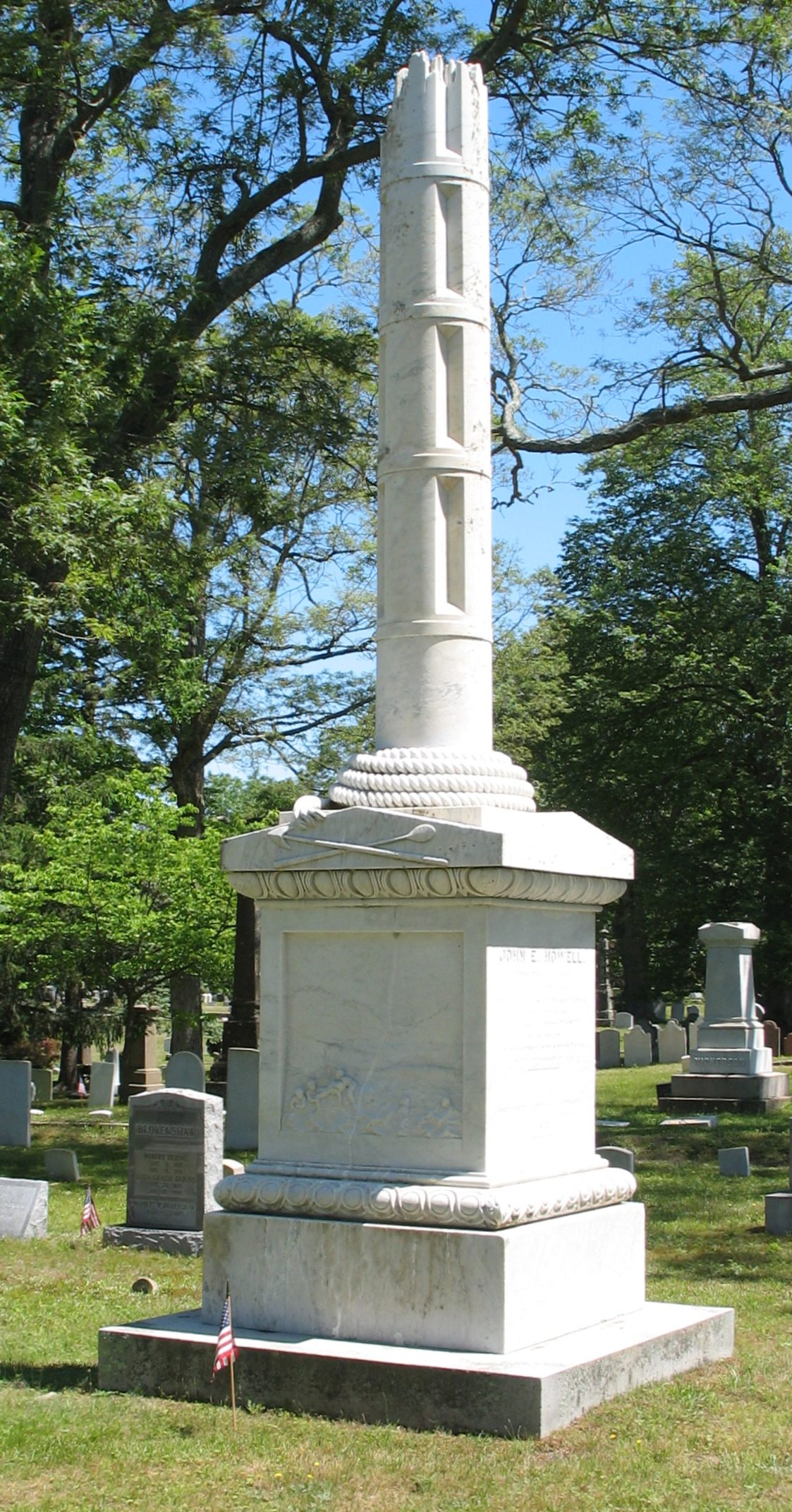
The Broken Mast Monument commemorates all the whalers who were lost at sea

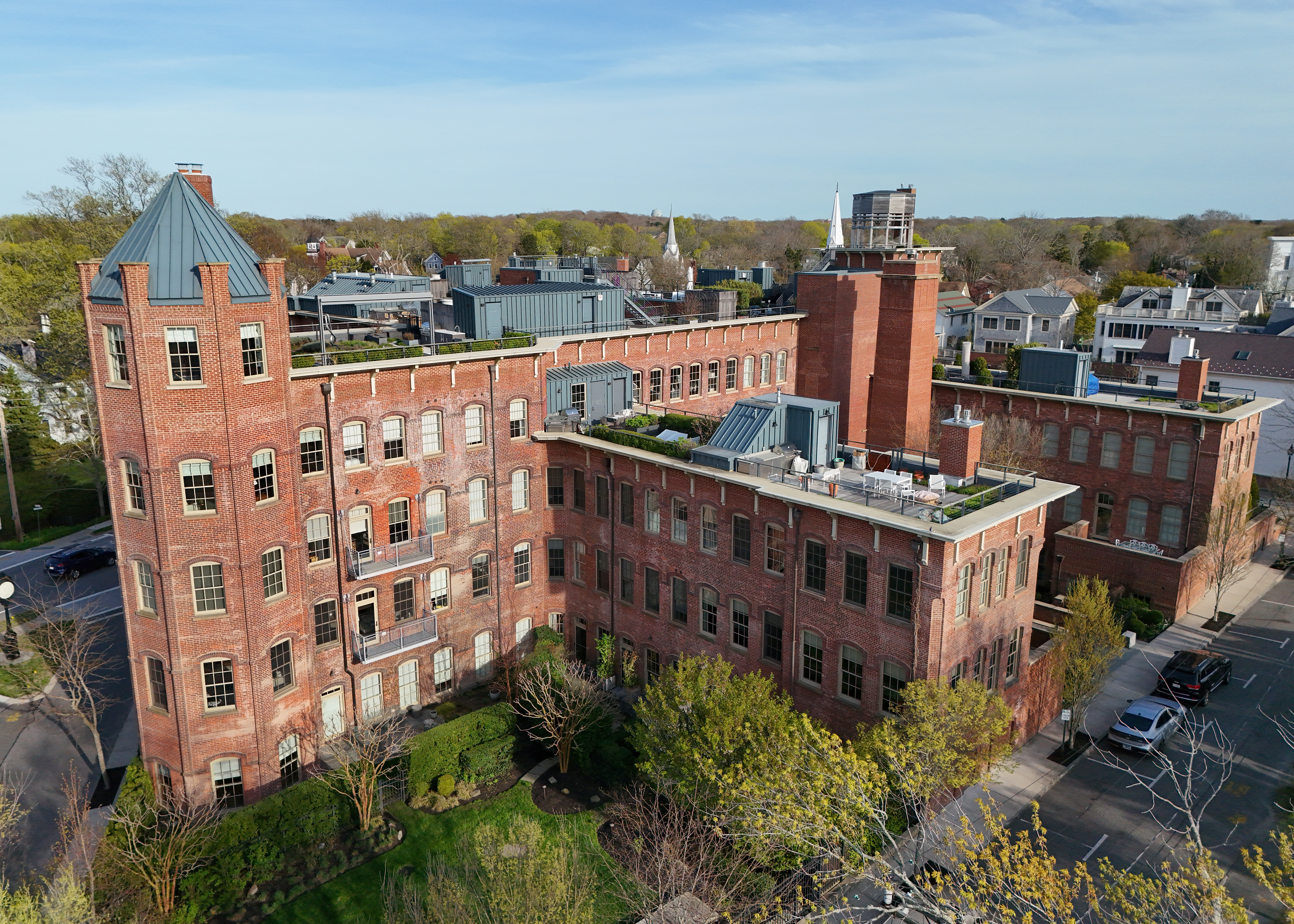
Watchcase Factory

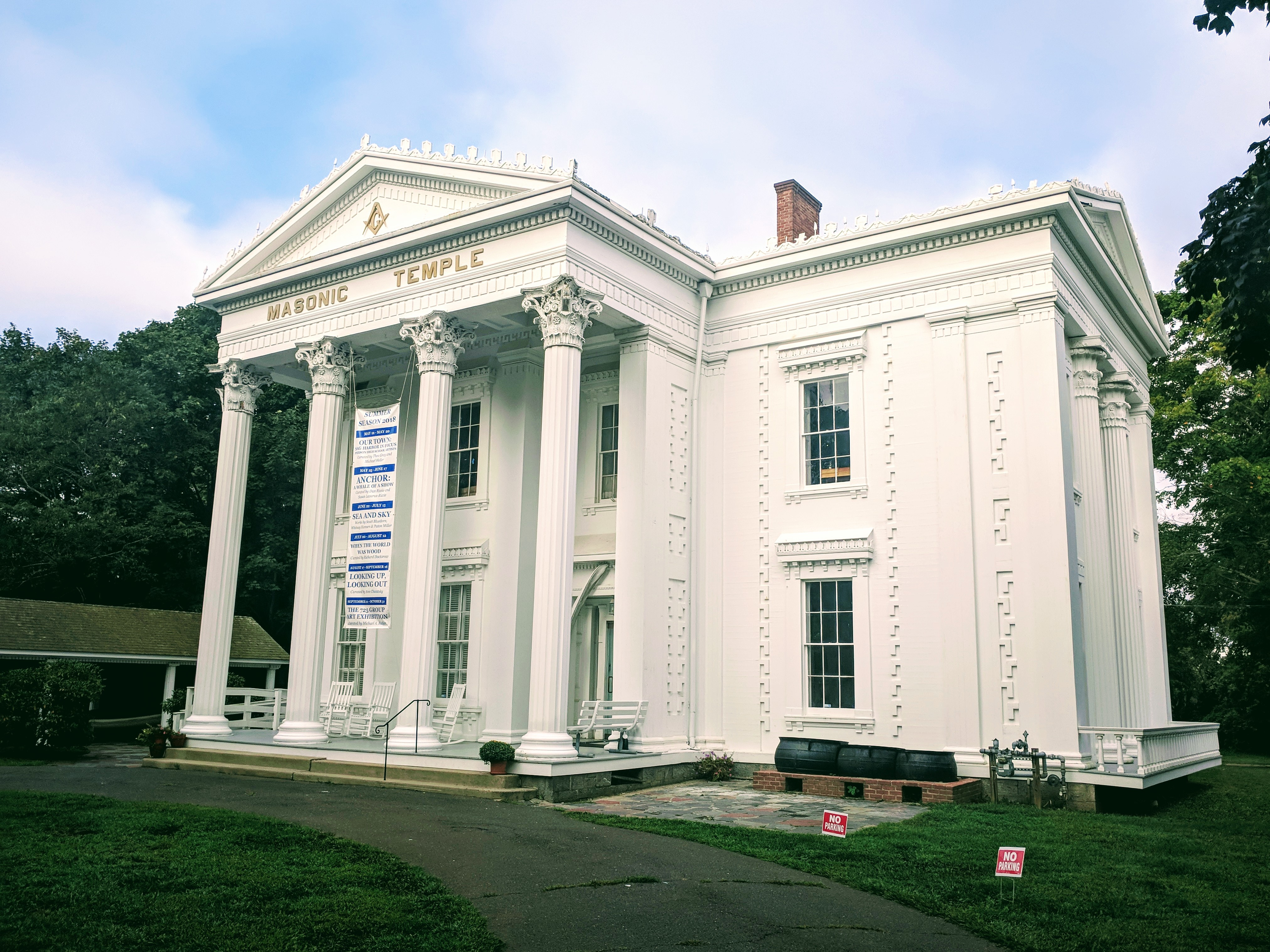
Whalers museum

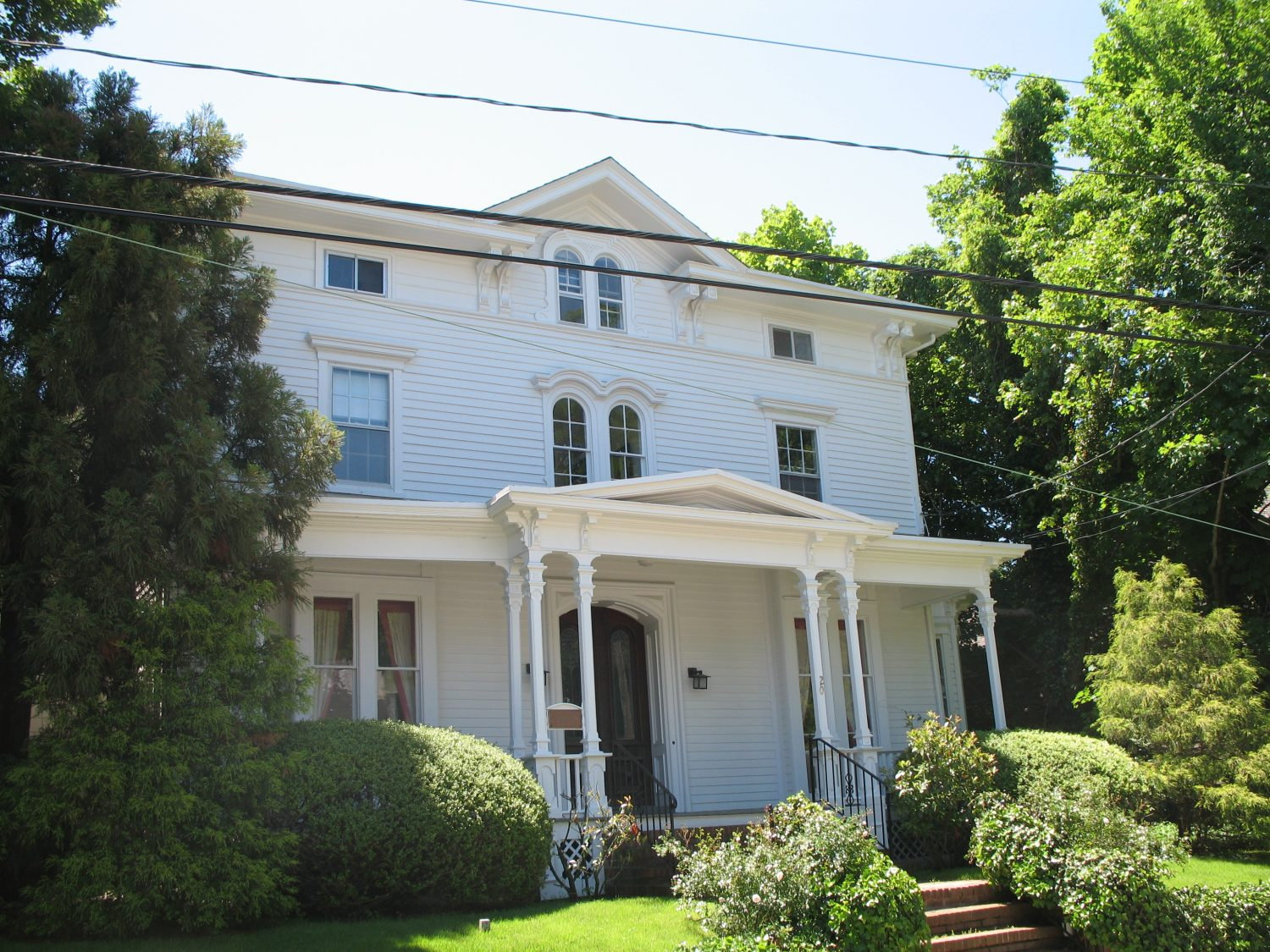
Summer home of President Chester A. Arthur, late 19th century

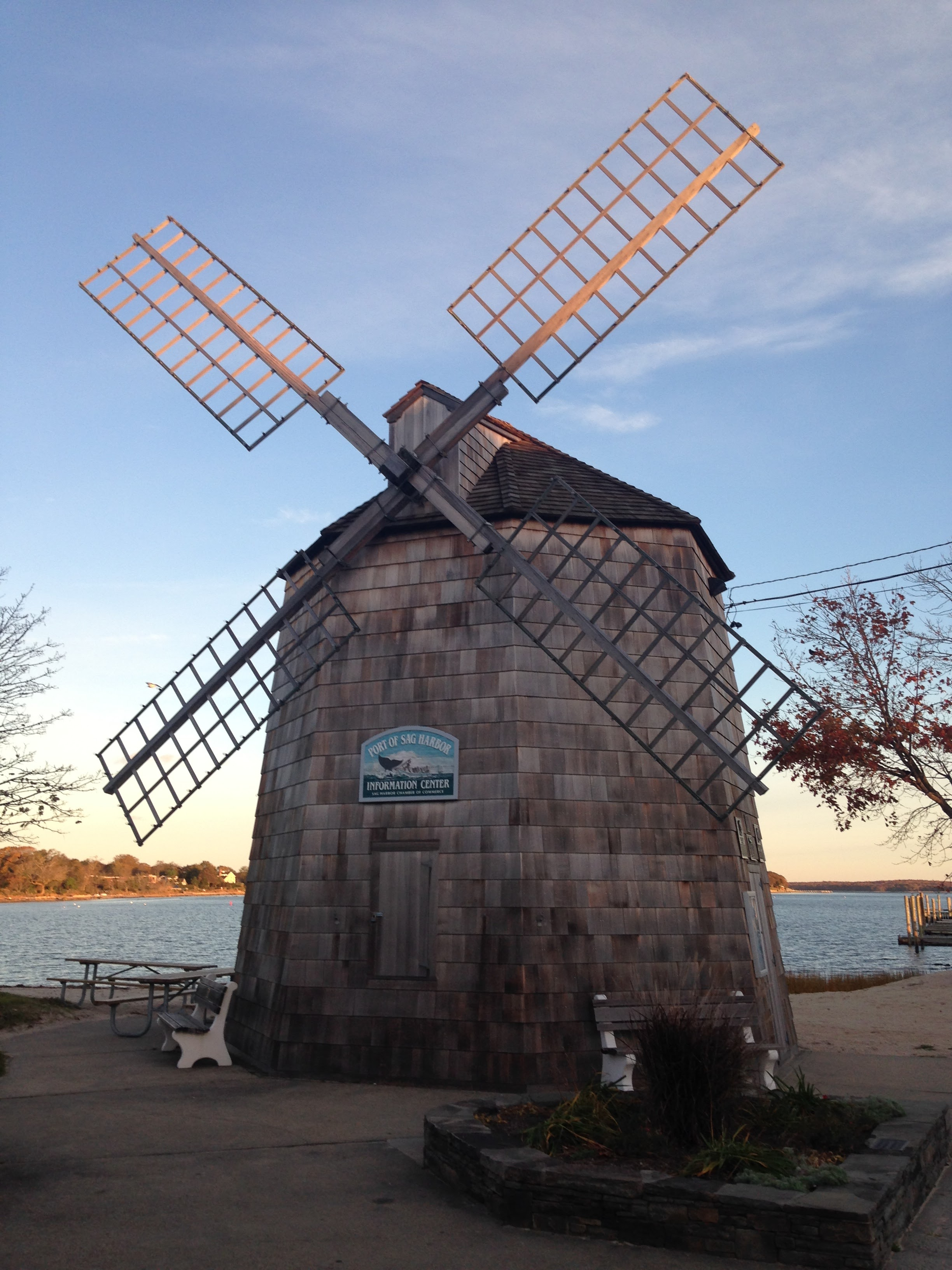
Windmill near the downtown district in Sag Harbor, NY.

Sag Harbor was settled by English colonists sometime between 1707 and 1730. Many probably migrated from New England by water, as did other settlers on eastern Long Island. The first bill of lading to use the name "Sag Harbor" was recorded in 1730.

While some accounts say the village was named for the neighboring settlement of Sagaponack, which at the time was called Sagg, historians say Sagaponack and Sag Harbor both were named after a tuber cultivated by the local Pequot people and used as a staple crop. In their Algonquian language, they called the vegetable sagabon. It was one of the first crops colonists sent to England. The tuber-producing vine is now known as the Apios americana.

During the American Revolutionary War, New York Patriots fled from the advancing British and Loyalist forces and departed from Sag Harbor by boat and ship for Connecticut. In 1777 American raiders under Return Jonathan Meigs attacked a British garrison at a fort on a hill in Sag Harbor, killing six and capturing 90 British soldiers in what was called Meigs Raid. The fort was dismantled after the war. The site has become known as the Old Burying Ground and is associated with the Old Whaler's Church.

Sag Harbor supplanted Northwest, another port about 5 miles (8 km) east of the village in the Town of East Hampton. International ships and the whaling industry had started in Northwest, but its port was too shallow for the developing traffic. The most valuable whale product was whale oil, which was used widely in lamps.

Sag Harbor became a major port for the whaling industry, and the processing and sale of this oil. By 1789 Sag Harbor had "had more tons of square-rigged vessels engaged in commerce than even New York City." It had become an international port.

After the Second Session of Congress on July 31, 1789, Sag Harbor was declared as the first official port of entry to the United States. Its streets were filled with sailors, artisans, merchants, representatives of the many different cultures working in shipping and whaling. As the first stop for ships entering United States territory, Sag Harbor received ships bound for New York City. The United States government placed a customs house in the town, the first on Long Island, to collect duties and other fees.

During the War of 1812, a British squadron dominated and controlled most of Long Island Sound. Several open British boats entered the harbor at night, without any advance planning; the young commanding midshipman, C. Claxton R.N., was curious about the village. He later wrote about his youthful misadventures years when serving as editor of The Naval Monitor. They landed at the wharf, but an alarm gun was fired before they could set fire to the coasting vessel docked there and they quickly retreated. Claxton and his men made it safely back to HMS Ramillies, anchored off Gardiners Island.

The village of Sag Harbor is in the Towns of both Southampton and East Hampton. The dividing line is Division Street, known as Town Line Road just south of the village. Most of the defining 19th-century landmarks of the village — including its Main Street, Old Whaler's Church, John Jermain Memorial Library, Whaling Museum, Custom House, the Old Burying Ground, Oakland Cemetery, Mashashimuet Park, and Otter Pond are in Southampton. However, almost all of the Bay Street marina complex, including Sag Harbor Yacht Club and Breakwater Yacht Club, at the foot of Main Street, is in East Hampton. Also there are the village's high school, the Sag Harbor State Golf Course, and the historic freedmen's community of Eastville, first developed in the early 1800s.

The whaling industry in Sag Harbor peaked in the 1840s, but its importance had been widely recognized. Writer Herman Melville mentioned Sag Harbor in his novel Moby Dick.

Arrived at last in old Sag Harbor; and seeing what the sailors did there; and then going on to Nantucket, and seeing how they spent their wages in that place also, poor Queequeg gave it up for lost. Thought he, it's a wicked world in all meridians; I'll die a pagan.

Historic buildings from this period include the Old Whaler's Church, a Presbyterian church that sported a 185-foot-high (56 m) steeple. When the church opened in 1843, the steeple made it the tallest structure on Long Island. The steeple collapsed during the Great Hurricane of 1938. While the church has received major restoration, the steeple has not been rebuilt.

Whaling merchant Benjamin Huntting II commissioned a grand, 1845 Greek Revival home designed by American architect Minard Lafever. It is now owned and used by The Sag Harbor Whaling & Historical Museum, which is open to the public. The Masonic Lodge (Wamponamon 437), which occupies the second floor, celebrated its 150th anniversary in 2008.

Lafever is also credited with designing the Old Whaler's Church and the Masonic Temple. The broken mast monument in Oakland Cemetery is the most visible of several memorials to men who died at sea.

The whaling business collapsed after 1847, as other methods were discovered to create kerosene and other fuels; the first was coal oil. The discovery of petroleum in Titusville, Pennsylvania, in 1859 sealed the end.

Many of the ships based in Sag Harbor carried erstwhile miners around South America to San Francisco during the California Gold Rush, where the vessels were abandoned. The last whaling ship, the Myra, captained by Henry W. Babcock, sailed from Sag Harbor in 1871.

Mercator Cooper sailed as crew out of Sag Harbor on November 9, 1843, on the Manhattan. He was on a voyage to Japan, and became one of the first Americans to visit Tokyo Bay. Pyrrhus Concer, an African-American sailor, also served on the ship; he was the first African-American man known to be seen by the Japanese. Cooper continued with major sailing expeditions. On January 26, 1853, he left Sag Harbor on the Levant, bound to the South Pole. He was the first person to set foot on East Antarctica.

In 1870 the Long Island Rail Road built a Sag Harbor Branch to the village. It began to carry visitors and summer residents attracted to the harbor and the light of eastern Long Island. Given changes in passenger traffic and railroad operations, the former station is now operated as a gardening store.

New residents continued to settle in the village. In 1896, the oldest synagogue on Long Island, Temple Adas Israel, was founded in Sag Harbor.

During World War I, the E. W. Bliss Company tested torpedoes in the harbor a half mile north of the village (they did not have live warheads). As part of the process, Long Wharf in Sag Harbor was reinforced with concrete. Rail spurs were built along the wharf to carry torpedoes to be loaded onto ships for testing. At the time, the wharf was owned by the Long Island Rail Road, which handled the transport of torpedoes to Sag Harbor. Among those observing the tests was Thomas Alva Edison. Divers occasionally still find torpedoes from this era on the bay floor. Most of the wharf's buildings, including one now operated as the Bay Street Theatre, were built during this period.

Sag Harbor was the residence of writer John Steinbeck from 1955 until his death in 1968. Steinbeck did some of his writings in a little house on the edge of his property, including The Winter of Our Discontent, which was set in a fictionalized version of Sag Harbor and whose main character works at a grocery store modelled after Schiavoni's. His view from the writing house overlooked the Upper Sag Harbor Cove. As recounted in his memoir, Travels with Charley, Steinbeck started an 11-week trip with his dog, Charley, from Sag Harbor across the United States.

Steinbeck Writers' Retreat is a writer's residency program at John Steinbeck's home in Sag Harbor. It is run by the Michener Center for Writers at the University of Texas in Austin. Every fellow and writer-in-residence interacts with the community during their time at the residency, through readings from novels, film screenings and discussions, or read-throughs of plays.

The Church is a nonprofit arts center in Sag Harbor was founded by artists Eric Fischl and April Gornik. It opened April 15, 2021, and has an exhibition space and artists residency program.

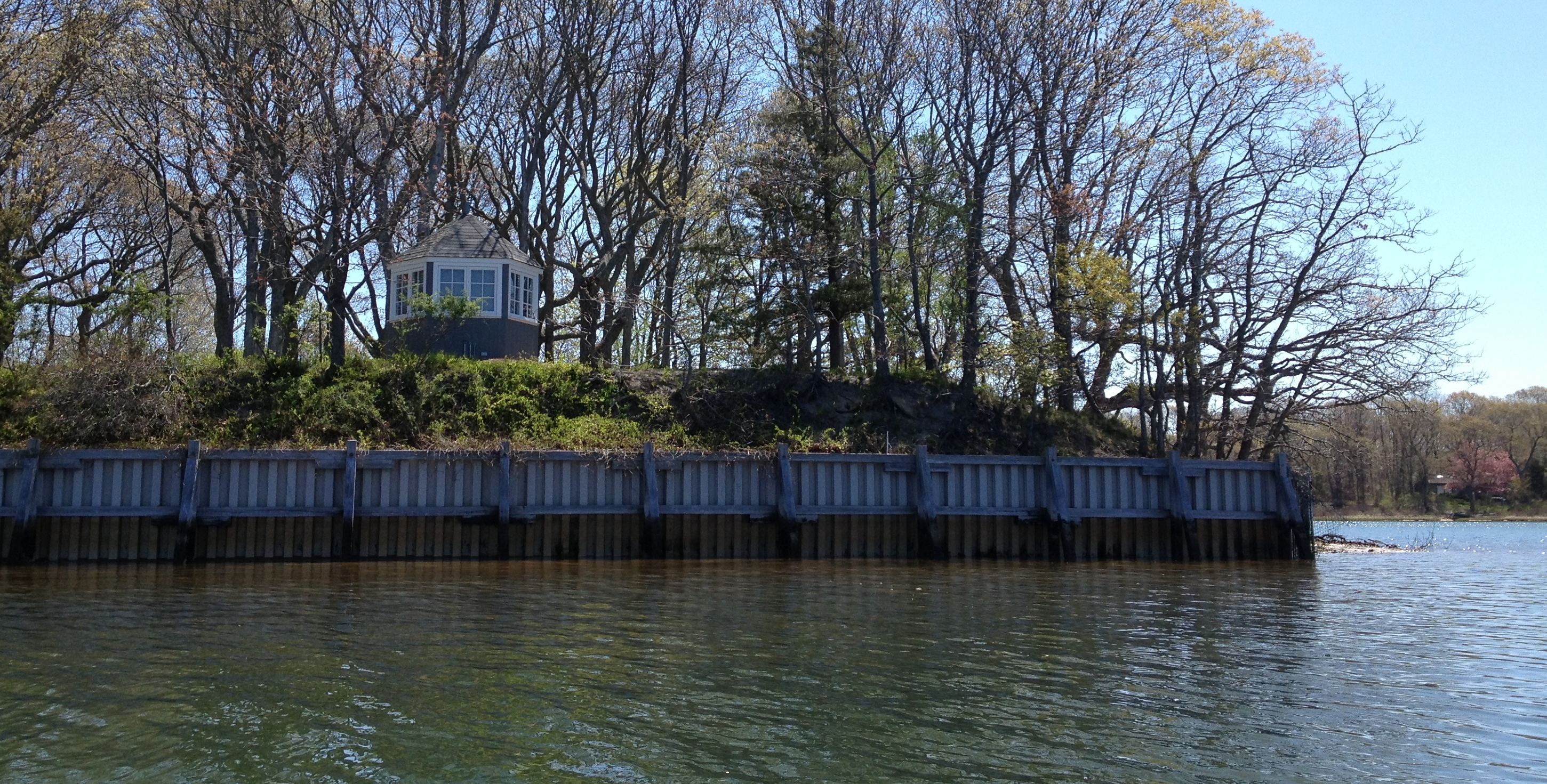
John Steinbeck's writing house

The Sag Harbor-North Haven Bridge was renamed in November 2008 as The LCpl Jordan Haerter Veterans' Memorial Bridge. It is believed to be the site of the 1995 suicide of Ray Johnson, a pop artist. Spalding Gray, a writer and performer, attempted suicide at the bridge in September 2002 and October 2003.

=== African-American history ===
The United States Coast Survey map from the mid-1830s shows the square symbols for houses in the Eastville area. By 1840, the St. David A.M.E. Zion congregation had built a church on Eastville Avenue.

Poet and educator Olivia Ward Bush-Banks (1869–1944) was born in Sag Harbour on February 27, 1869, to parents of African and Montauk descent. Noted author Colson Whitehead wrote the book Sag Harbor about his childhood in the area.

After the Second World War, African-Americans started to settle in what became the neighborhoods of Sag Harbor Hills, Ninevah, Azurest, Eastville and Chatfield's Hill. Hunter J. Terry (1887–1968) had been a regular summer visitor here, at a coastal woodland acreage she called Azurest. She urged the owners, the Gales of Huntington, L.I., to develop the land as a peaceful resort for African-Americans. Lots were cheap at the time, although loans were not available, thus lots and houses are small. The streets Terry Drive, Richards Drive, and Meredith Avenue were named for members of Terry's family. The roads Walker and Milton were named for African-American whalers. Cuffee Drive was named for Paul Cuffee, a prominent African-American whaler. The first homeowners and two more generations had lived there near the beach by the time Terry died in the late 1960s. Later, some African-American celebrities and prominent New York businessmen made their summer homes there.

As of the 2010s, there is pressure from investors who, consolidating lots and planning to build larger houses than is customary, pose a threat to the character of the neighborhoods. In 2016, a collective group was formed to study these impacts on the Sag Harbor Hills, Azurest, and Ninevah Subdivisions, known by the acronym SANS. They have begun a survey of the historic resources of this area, believing they may gain listing as a historic district on the State and National Register of Historic Places, through which they could establish protection for the district. On July 10, 2019 (NP ref#100004217) was listed as the Sag Harbor Hills, Azurest, and Ninevah Beach Subdivisions Historic District.

== Geography ==
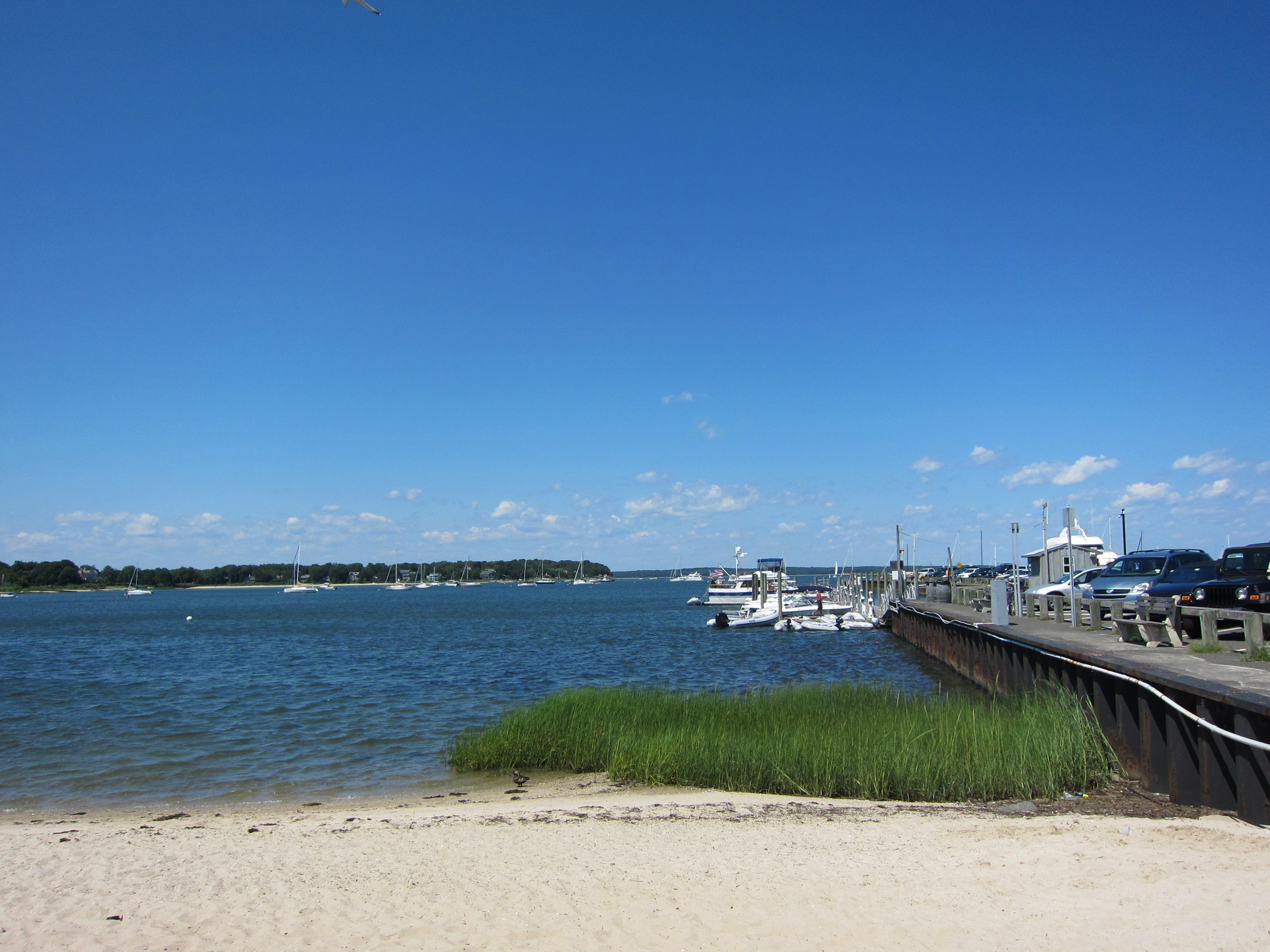
Sag Harbor Bay and Long Wharf

According to the United States Census Bureau, the village has an area of 2.3 square miles (6.0 km^{2}), of which 1.8 square miles (4.7 km^{2}) is land and 0.54 square miles (1.4 km^{2}), or 22.44%, is water.

In the village of Sag Harbor, fresh drinking water was obtained from digging wells to support the town's population. “The original source of water supply was secured from four dug wells in the southern part of the village of Sag Harbor”. As Sag Harbor's population has increased, the village has had to start bringing in fresh water from pipe lines.

As in many areas, the village practice of running sewage and storm water into the bays of Sag Harbor had to change. Sewage from the village of Sag Harbor is processed by the Department of Public Works, Wastewater Treatment Plant. It uses chlorine to kill bacteria before sewage enters the bay. By 2014, the village was using an ultraviolet light system to kill the bacteria.

=== Topography ===
The majority of Sag Harbor lies on a flat, sandy coastal plain which makes up much of southern Long Island and extends along the southern coast of the island. It is the remains of a glacial moraine. Small hills rise up from the shore at about 0.3 miles (0.48 km) inland. Knolls and hills are dominated mostly by Red and Scarlet oak trees, which are interspersed with pitch and white pines. On many of the protected bay shores, wetlands and dune ecosystems dominate the land.

== Demographics ==
Historical population
Census	Pop.	Note	%±
1870	1,723		—
1900	1,969		—
1910	3,408		73.1%
1920	2,993		−12.2%
1930	2,773		−7.4%
1940	2,517		−9.2%
1950	2,373		−5.7%
1960	2,346		−1.1%
1970	2,363		0.7%
1980	2,581		9.2%
1990	2,134		−17.3%
2000	2,313		8.4%
2010	2,169		−6.2%
2020	2,772		27.8%
U.S. Decennial Census

As of the census of 2000, there were 2,313 people, 1,120 households, and 583 families residing in the village. The population density was 1,345.1 inhabitants per square mile (519.3/km^{2}). There were 1,942 housing units at an average density of 1,129.4 per square mile (436.1/km^{2}). The racial makeup of the village was 85.78% White, 7.44% African American, 0.52% Native American, 0.95% Asian, 2.72% from other races, and 2.59% from two or more races. Hispanic or Latino of any race were 7.31% of the population. As of the 2020 U.S. Census, there were 2,772 village residents.

There were 1,120 households, of which 18.8% had children under the age of 18 living with them, 39.6% were married couples living together, 9.4% had a female householder with no husband present, and 47.9% were non-families. 40.7% of all households were made up of individuals, and 18.4% had someone living alone who was 65 years of age or older. The average household size was 2.06 and the average family size was 2.81.

In the village, the population was spread out, with 16.5% under the age of 18, 5.4% from 18 to 24, 25.4% from 25 to 44, 28.6% from 45 to 64, and 24.2% who were 65 years of age or older. The median age was 46 years. For every 100 females, there were 91.6 males. For every 100 females age 18 and over, there were 89.8 males.

The village's median household income was $52,275 and the median family income was $70,536. Males had a median income of $41,181 versus 34,750 for females. The village's per capita income was $40,566. About 1.8% of families and 4.2% of the population were below the poverty line, including 1.9% of those under age 18 and 3.8% of those age 65 or over.

As of 2015, the village's median household income was $100,900, and the median per capita income was $63,995. The value of owner-occupied housing was $918,500 with a margin of error of +/- $53,587. Three of the special tax districts in Sag Harbor were ranked among the 20 Lowest Property Tax Districts on Long Island and those same three districts were ranked among the 30 lowest special tax districts in all of New York State.

== Media ==
=== Newspapers ===
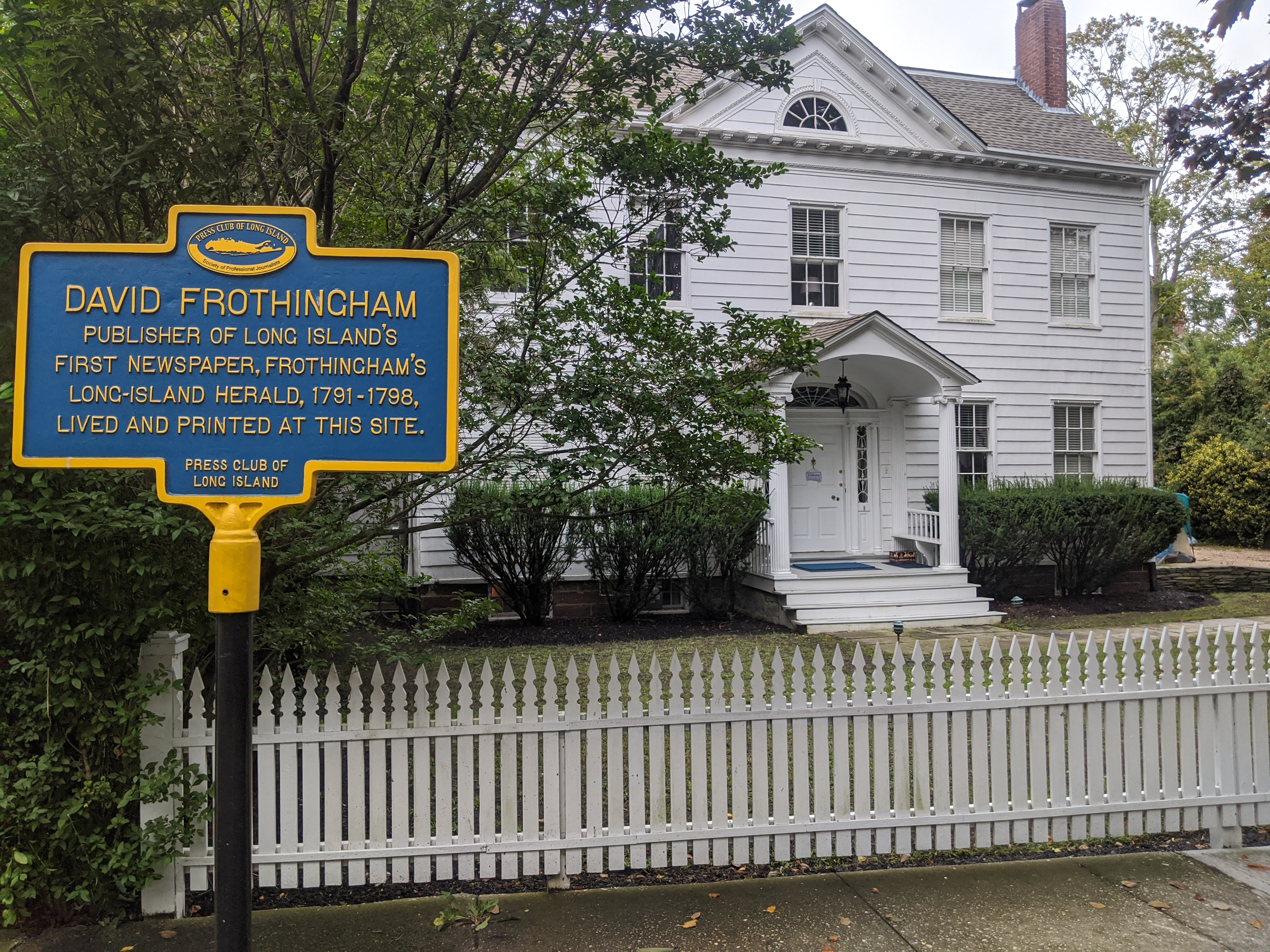
Frothingham Marker, Main St

Long Island's first newspaper, Frothingham's Long-Island Herald, was published in Sag Harbor by David Frothingham between 1791 and 1796. His wife, Nancy Pell, ran the newspaper until 1802. Frothingham was sued and found guilty of slander by Alexander Hamilton for an article published in the Brooklyn newspaper, The Argus. Unable to pay the bond, Frothingham became a seaman. He is believed to have died at sea, somewhere off the coast of Africa.

According to local historian Dorothy Zaykowski, "Sag Harbor's earliest newspapers published little in the way of local news, concentrating instead on a story, sermon, and both national and international events. It is likely folks learned all the local gossip and goings on at the general store barber shop, or on the street corner."

The community newspaper The Corrector was first published in 1822. According to Zaykowski, Henry Wentworth Hunt came to the village from Boston with three sons, two of whom followed him into the newspaper business. He published The Corrector weekly until 1837; then published it semi-weekly until his death in 1859. His sons Alexander and Brinley Sleight Hunt took over and published the newspaper daily. When this proved unprofitable, they reverted to weekly publication. The Corrector later was known as the Sag Harbor Corrector.

The Sag Harbor Corrector was eventually purchased in 1919 by Burton Corwin, owner of the Sag Harbor News; the merged papers became the Sag Harbor News and Corrector. This amalgamated newspaper was subsequently purchased in the late 1920s by the Gardner family, owners of The Sag Harbor Express. They made the latter the only newspaper in town. The Sag Harbor Express is still the newspaper for Sag Harbor Village, the Village of North Haven, the Sag Harbor School District and the Bridgehampton School District.

=== Radio ===
WLNG has been on-the-air at 92.1 FM since April 1969. The station previously operated on 1600 AM from 1963 until 1969.

== Entertainment ==
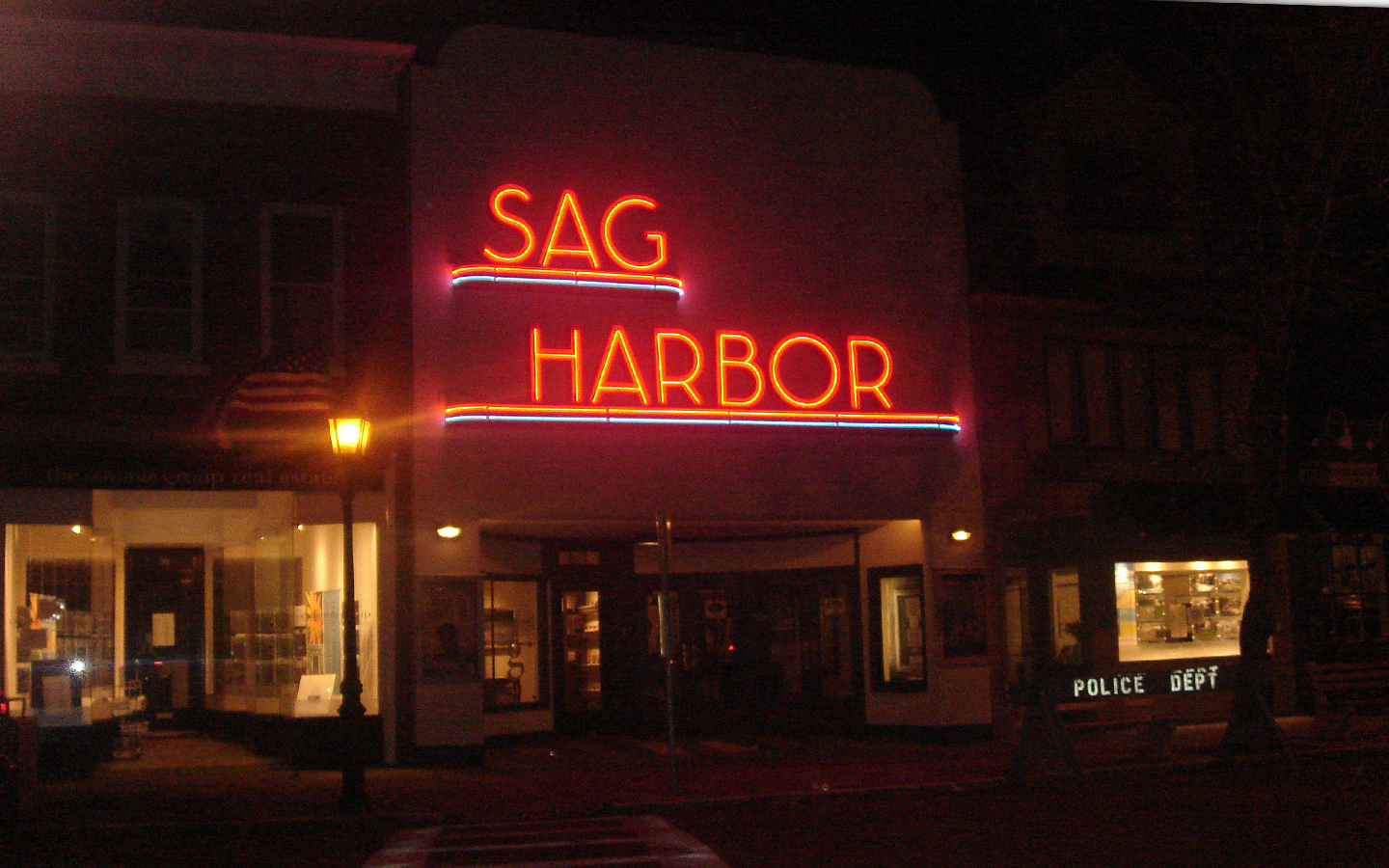
Sag Harbor Cinema

Since 1915, four movie theaters have operated at 90 Main Street. They were George's Theatre, The Elite, Glynne's Sag Harbor Theatre, and the Sag Harbor Theatre. The latter was known for its art deco neon sign that read "Sag Harbor." The theatre changed its name to the Sag Harbor Cinema in 1978. On December 16, 2016, a fire broke out and destroyed the cinema. The cinema was rebuilt by the non-profit Sag Harbor Partnership, opening again in 2021.

Alan Alda's 1986 film Sweet Liberty was shot in Sag Harbor.

The Bay Street Theater was founded in 1991 by Sybil Christopher, Emma Walton Hamilton and Stephen Hamilton in a building on Long Wharf. The theater operates year-round.

Sag Harbor is the home of actress Julie Andrews.

== Education ==
The school district for the village is Sag Harbor Union Free School District. The district includes both the Sag Harbor Elementary School and Pierson Middle-High School.

Stella Maris Regional School a Catholic private school, was based in Sag Harbor but closed in 2011. In May 2016, voters in Sag Harbor approved the Sag Harbor Union Free School District's purchase of the Stella Maris Regional School property from the St. Andrew Roman Catholic Church for $3.3 million. The building now houses the district's pre-kindergarten program.

== Nature and protected areas ==
Nature preserves have been established in the area and Sag Harbor has rich fauna for its region. Endangered species, such as the eastern tiger salamander, inhabit wetlands surrounding the village. The "Long Pond Greenbelt", which straddles Sag Harbor's southern boundary, is a well-known chain of ponds formed by a retreating glacier. Other natural sites around the village include Barcelona Neck Preserve, Millers Ground Preserve, Sag Harbor Woods Preserve, and the recently acquired Cilli Farm, which lies in the center of the village.

Mammals found in these areas include white-tailed deer, red fox, eastern coyote, long-tailed weasel, mink, muskrat, woodchuck, and several bat species. Bottlenose dolphins and harbour porpoises are seen in the bay. There may be river otters, which are close to local extinction in Long Island, but an estimated eight animals are thought to have recently migrated from Connecticut. A large array of amphibian and reptilian species also live in the area, including the marbled salamander, tiger salamander, spotted salamander, box turtle, spotted turtle, gray tree frog, eastern newt, black racer snake, hognose snake and rough green snake, to name a few. Kazimierz Wierzyński, an exiled Polish poet and a writer, who lived in Sag Harbor for almost twenty years with his wife Halina, devoted large parts of his collection of essays My Private America to the animals he saw there, especially the birds, and an American "attraction to nature."

=== Cilli Farm ===
The Cilli Farm was a dairy farm owned and operated by Vitali and Antonina Cilli and their family in the early 1900s. The village acquired the farm to operate it as a refuge for wildlife in the area. It serves as an ecological island, giving large animals such as white-tailed deer a home base. Although it is protected, it is threatened by dumping and littering. The large farm acreage includes various habitats, such as including marshes, grasslands, birch forests, cedar groves, sand flats, and coastal watersheds, providing key habitat for wildlife and supporting great botanic diversity.

The wet lands and bay shellfish have suffered episodes of Brown Tide, an algal hyperproduction. The Brown Tide has adversely affected the populations of bay scallops and mussels in the surrounding bays. When the brown tide is active, the scallops and mussels populations decline.

=== The Sag Harbor Oyster Club ===
The Sag Harbor Oyster Club was formalized into a 501-3c in 2020 with the mission of clean water advocacy up and down the East Coast. Fully-funded by Simon Harrison Real Estate from its inception, the effort follows on from the Conscience Point Shellfish Hatchery, an "oyster garden" under the Sag Harbor village docks funded and maintained by real estate broker and clean water advocate, Simon Harrison. The oyster farming endeavor was intended to put the shellfish to work cleaning the harbor's water.

In January 2016, after learning that oysters were being raised so close to the outlet pipe of the Sag Harbor sewage water treatment plant on the village waterfront, the New York State Department of Environmental Conservation ordered the Sag Harbor Harbormaster to shutter the operation. New York State prohibits cultivation of shellfish in uncertified waters – where harvesting of oysters for human consumption is banned. A further danger is oysters ingesting (and filtering) polluted water, as they too become tainted. Harrison stressed his oysters were not offered for human consumption.

== Notable people ==
- Julie Andrews, actress
- John Avlon, journalist and author
- Christie Brinkley, model
- Peter Browngardt, animator, storyboard artist, writer, producer, voice actor, director of The Day the Earth Blew Up: A Looney Tunes Movie, creator of Uncle Grandpa
- Jimmy Buffett, musician, singer-songwriter, and businessman
- William Demby, writer
- Wendy Gaynor, entrepreneur and author
- Paul Hansen, real estate agent
- Billy Joel, singer, songwriter, pianist
- Don Lemon, television journalist
- Dan C. Rizzie, artist and musician
- Roy Scheider, actor
- Brinley D. Sleight, newspaper editor and politician
- George Sterling, poet
- Nate Williams, NBA player
- Kyle McGowin, former MLB pitcher
