= Manhattan (1843 ship) =

The Manhattan was a United States whaling ship under Captain Mercator Cooper that made the first authorized visit of an American ship to Tokyo Bay, in 1845.

== Events in Japan ==
The Manhattan left the whaling port Sag Harbor, New York on November 9, 1843.

On March 14–15, 1845, its crew rescued 22 shipwrecked Japanese sailors in the Bonin Islands. The first 11 sailors were found on Tori-shima, where Manhattan anchored to hunt for turtles to supplement the ship's provisions, and were survivors from the Koho-maru wrecked en route to Edo. The next day 11 more sailors were found on a foundering Japanese boat Senju-maru (along with a detailed navigation map of Japan).

The Manhattan set sail for Edo to repatriate the sailors. Outside Edo Bay four of the survivors took a Japanese boat with a message that Cooper wanted to deliver the remainder to the harbor. The Japanese normally wanted to avoid contact with outsiders due to the Tokugawa shogunate's official policy of national isolation. However, on April 18, 1845, an emissary from the shogunate gave the ship permission to proceed. "About three hundred Japanese boats with about 15 men in each took the ship in tow", according to Cooper's log. "They took all our arms out to keep till we left. There were several of the nobility came on board to see the ship. They appeared very friendly."

Japanese accounts place the anchorage of Manhattan at Uraga, at the mouth of Tokyo Bay. It had been over 220 years since so many foreigners had been so close to the Japanese metropolis, but no one from the vessel was permitted to actually land in Japan.

The Japanese examined his ship and took particular note of Pyrrhus Concer, a crewman from Southampton, Long Island, who was the only African American on board, and of a Shinnecock Native American named Eleazar. The interpreter from the Japanese side was Moriyama Einosuke, who would later serve during the Perry Expedition.

The Japanese refused payment for provisions and gave the ship water, 20 sacks of rice, two sacks of wheat, a box of flour, 11 sacks of sweet potatoes, 50 fowl, two cords of wood, radishes and 10 pounds of tea, and a set of lacquer bowls for the captain, together with a letter from the Shogun. They thanked the Manhattan's crew for returning the shipwrecked sailors and told them to never return, not even to bring back more castaways, on pain of death. On April 21, 500 small boats towed the Manhattan 20 miles out to sea.

== Aftermath ==
Cooper took with him the map that charted the islands of Japan that had been found on the disabled Japanese ship. He turned it over to the United States government when the ship returned to Sag Harbor on October 14, 1846. News of Cooper's encounter was extensively publicized in the United States. Matthew Perry was said to have used the map on his visit to Japan on July 8, 1853.

Monuments to the event are across from Cooper's home at 81 Windmill Lane in Southampton, in Southampton Cemetery, and in Tokyo.
