= Pyrrhus Concer =

American sailor (1814–1897)

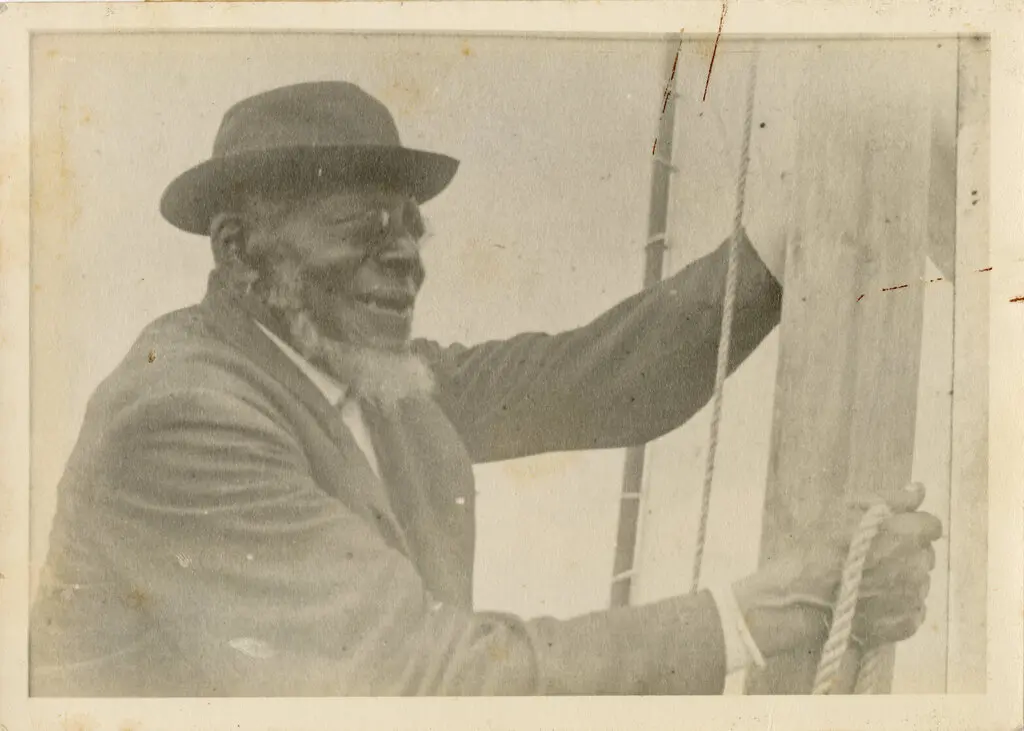
Pyrrhus Concer

Pyrrhus Concer (March 17, 1814 – August 23, 1897) was a formerly enslaved American sailor from Southampton, New York who was aboard the whaling ship Manhattan, the first American ship to visit Tokyo in 1845.

== Life ==
Concer was enslaved by the Pyrrhus family and worked as a farmhand until 1832 (slavery in New York formally ended in 1827), after which he worked on whale ships out of Sag Harbor, New York.

In 1845, he was aboard the ship captained by Mercator Cooper that picked up 22 shipwrecked Japanese sailors in the Bonin Islands. The American vessel was allowed to enter Edo Bay under escort to return the sailors. Concer became an object of curiosity and is depicted in Japanese drawings of the event.

In 1849, he joined many of the people from the East End in the California Gold Rush. Afterward, he returned to Southampton, where he operated a small boat on Lake Agawam.

Pyrrhus Concer maintained a substantial financial portfolio for his time. His holdings included shares in the Southampton Water Works. He also lent money to others.

A monument to him was erected near the lake on the northwest corner by Pond Lane. He is buried in the North End Cemetery in Southampton with his wife.

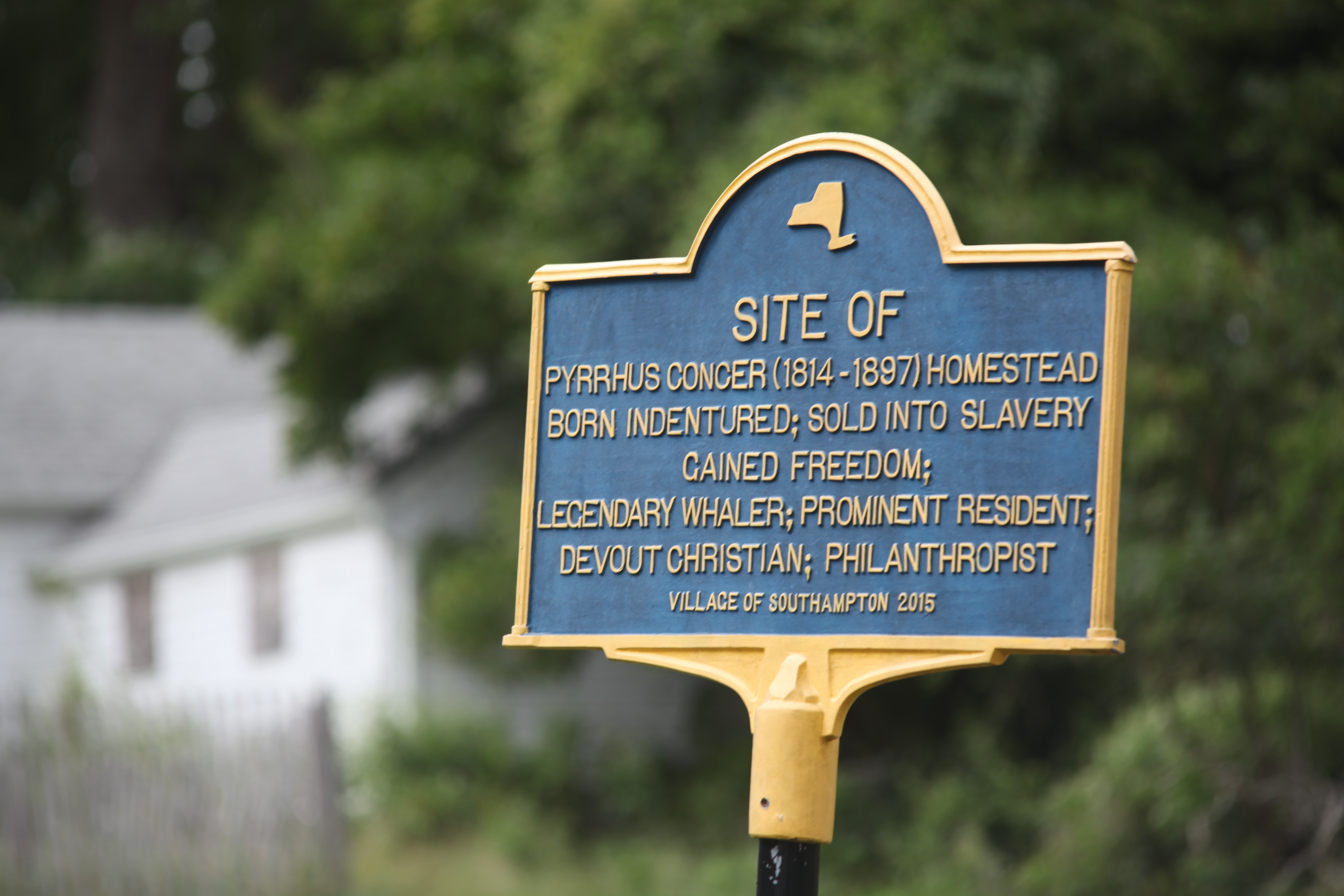
NYS Plaque - Pyrrhus Concer Homestead 6576 04

== Legacy ==
Attempts to rebuild his house, which was demolished in 2014 (the wood was salvaged and stored) has raised controversy in Southampton

His gravestone, engraved with an epitaph written by Elihu Root, is in Southampton's North End Graveyard: "Though born a slave, he possessed those virtues, without which kings are but slaves."
