= USS Preble (1839) =

Sloop-of-war of the United States Navy

Coordinates: 30.3847°N 87.1989°W

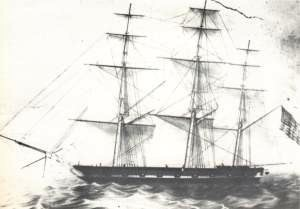
- The sloop-of-war USS Preble

History

Union Navy Jack
- Name: USS Preble
- Builder: Portsmouth Navy Yard
- Launched: 13 June 1839
- Commissioned: 1840
- Fate: Exploded and sunk, 27 April 1863

General characteristics
- Type: Sloop-of-war
- Displacement: 556 long tons (565 t)
- Length: 117 ft (36 m)
- Beam: 32 ft (9.8 m)
- Depth of hold: 15 ft (4.6 m)
- Propulsion: Sail
- Armament: 16 × 32-pounder guns

USS Preble was a United States Navy sloop-of-war with 16 guns, built by the Portsmouth Navy Yard, Kittery, Maine, launched June 13, 1839 and commissioned in 1840. She was named after Commodore Edward Preble (1761–1807).

== Early Service ==
Preble first sailed for Labrador, and then went to cruise in the Mediterranean Sea in 1843. She was attached to the African Squadron in 1845. In 1846, Preble sailed for New York and joined the Pacific Squadron on the West Coast of the United States, where she participated in the Mexican–American War.

== Sail to East Asia ==
In 1848, Captain James Glynn took her first to Hong Kong and then to Nagasaki, Japan, where she picked up some fourteen American and Hawaiian seamen who had become castaways in that "closed country".

On 1 November 1850, she set sail for the east coast of the United States, where she became a practice ship for midshipmen until 1857, when she was placed in ordinary service.

== Civil War Service ==
During the American Civil War, in July 1861, Preble joined the Gulf Blockading Squadron and participated to the blockade of the Mississippi River. She was posted at Head of the Passes on the Mississippi River on 12 October 1861 when the blockading squadron there was attacked by a Confederate States Navy force that included the first ironclad warship, CSS Manassas. Being a sail-powered ship, she did not join the battle but rather made a swift retreat out the Southwest Pass to safety in the Gulf of Mexico.

Preble was serving as a guard ship when, on 27 April 1863, while moored in Pensacola Bay off Pensacola, Florida, she caught fire due to the carelessness of a crewman. She was abandoned and exploded.
