= Moriyama Einosuke =

Tokugawa shogunate samurai (1820–1872)

- 森山 栄之助
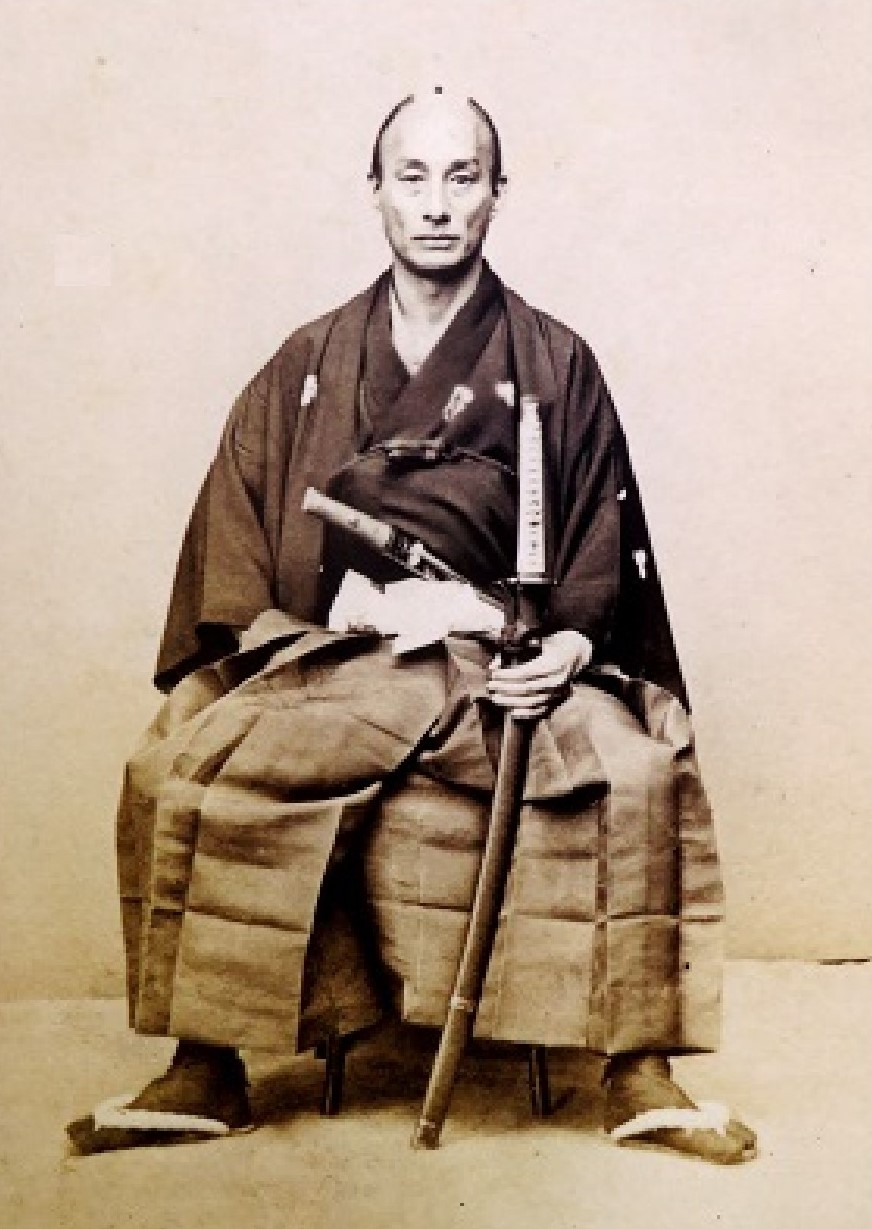
- Moriyama Einosuke
- Born: July 10, 1820
- Died: May 4, 1872 (aged 51)
- Military career
- Other work: Interpreter

Moriyama Einosuke (森山 栄之助; July 10, 1820 – May 4, 1872) was a samurai during the Tokugawa shogunate, and an interpreter of Dutch and English. He studied English under Dutch merchants and Ranald MacDonald. He was called upon to assist shogunate officials during the "Manhattan Incident" of 1845, during which the American whaling ship Manhattan approached Edo to repatriate 22 castaway Japanese seamen. As Chief Dutch Interpreter, he was later one of the chief men involved in the negotiations with Commodore Perry in regard to the opening of Japan to the outside world.

Samuel Wells Williams, a member of Perry's second visit noted in 1854:

A new and superior interpreter came with Saborosuke, named Moriyama Yenosuke ... He speaks English well enough to render any other interpreter unnecessary, and this will assist our intercourse greatly. He ... asked if Ronald McDonald (sic) was well, or if we knew him. ... giving us all a good impression of his education and breeding. (Williams, p.120, March 3rd 1854)

== See also ==
- Nakahama Manjirō
