= Old Dutch Church =

Old Dutch Church can refer to two buildings in the Hudson Valley region of the U.S. state of New York, both designated National Historic Landmarks:

- Old Dutch Church (Kingston, New York), formally known as the First Protestant Dutch Reformed Church of Kingston
- Old Dutch Church of Sleepy Hollow
