= Second Church of Christ =

Historic church in Connecticut, United States

- U.S. National Register of Historic Places
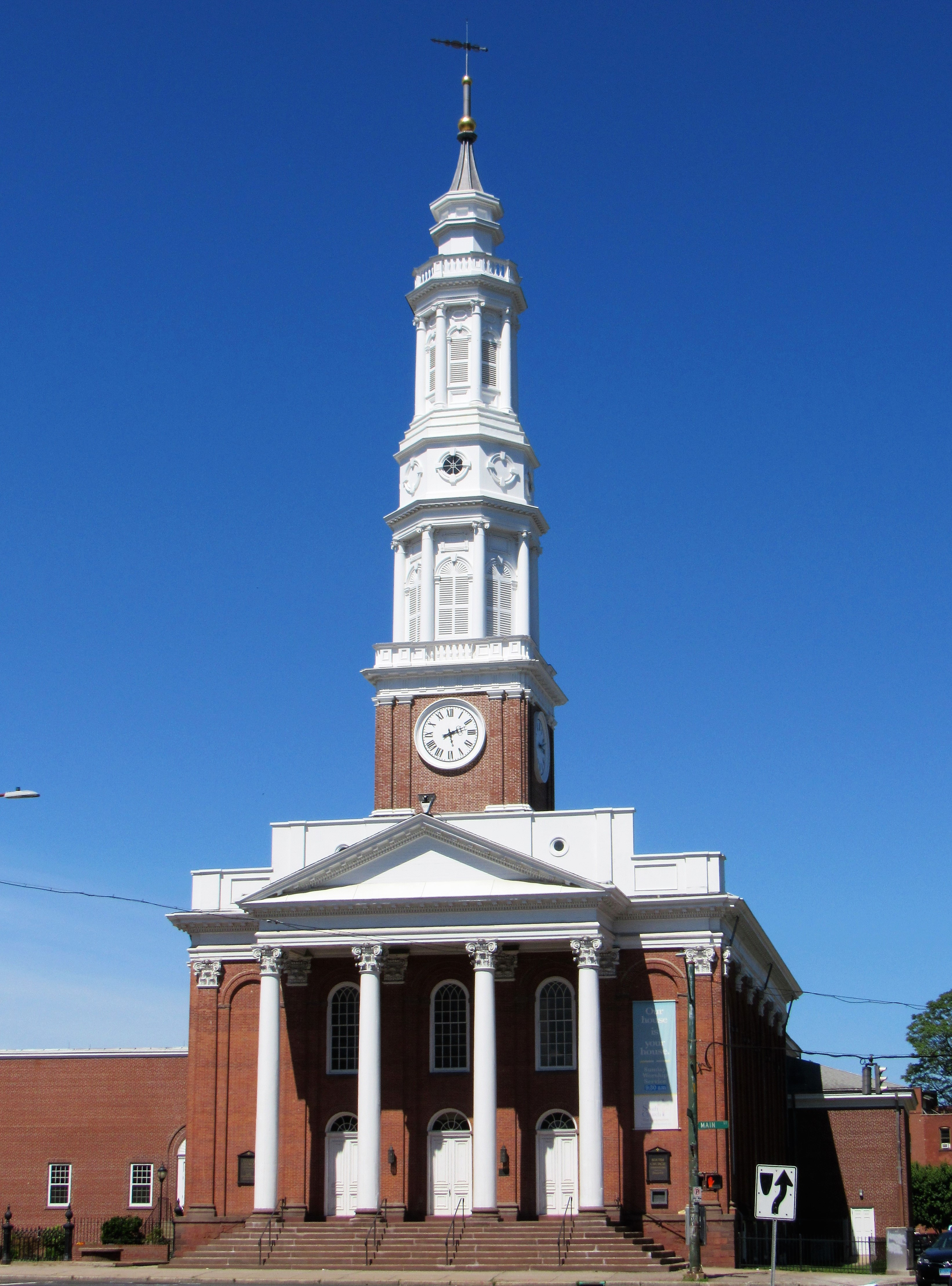

- Location within Connecticut Location within the United States
- Location: 277 Main Street; Hartford, Connecticut
- Coordinates: 41°46′7″N 72°40′33″W
- Area: 2 acres (0.81 ha)
- Built: 1825
- Architect: Minard Lafever
- Architectural style: Greek Revival, Federal
- NRHP reference No.: 78002836
- Added to NRHP: January 9, 1978

The Second Church of Christ, known more recently as the South Congregational Church, is a historic church in Hartford, Connecticut. Built in 1825–27, it is one of the oldest surviving public buildings in the city. It is the third home of its congregation, which was founded in 1670, and is one of the oldest purely Congregationalist groups in the nation. The building was listed on the National Register of Historic Places in 1978.

== Architecture and history ==
The South Congregational Church is located south of downtown Hartford, at the southwest corner of Main and Buckingham Streets. It is a two-story rectangular brick building, fronted by an elaborate tetrastyle Greek Revival temple front, and an elaborate multi-stage tower. The building's interior is reflective of a mid-19th century Greek Revival restyling conducted by architect Minard Lafever.

When the Connecticut Colony was established in the 1630s, its religious organizations were dominated by Rev. Thomas Hooker. Following Hooker's death in 1647, issues of church doctrine and governance began to divide his congregation in Hartford. These led to a split in 1670, in which the Second Church was formed by 31 members of that congregation. The congregation claims to adhere to Hooker's original covenant, of which they have a copy in his hand. Its first church was built near this spot, as was the second. The present building was constructed in 1825-27, on land previously occupied by the parsonage of its second minister, Thomas Buckingham. It was built by local master builders Nathaniel Woodhouse and William Hayden, and is one of only four surviving public buildings in the city that was built before 1830. In 1847 a two-story brick addition was made to the rear and side, carefully designed and integrated into the original by Joseph Camp. This addition was extensively damaged by a tornado in 1979.

== See also ==
- National Register of Historic Places listings in Hartford, Connecticut
