= Second Reformed Dutch Church of Kingston =

Historic church in New York, United States

- U.S. National Register of Historic Places
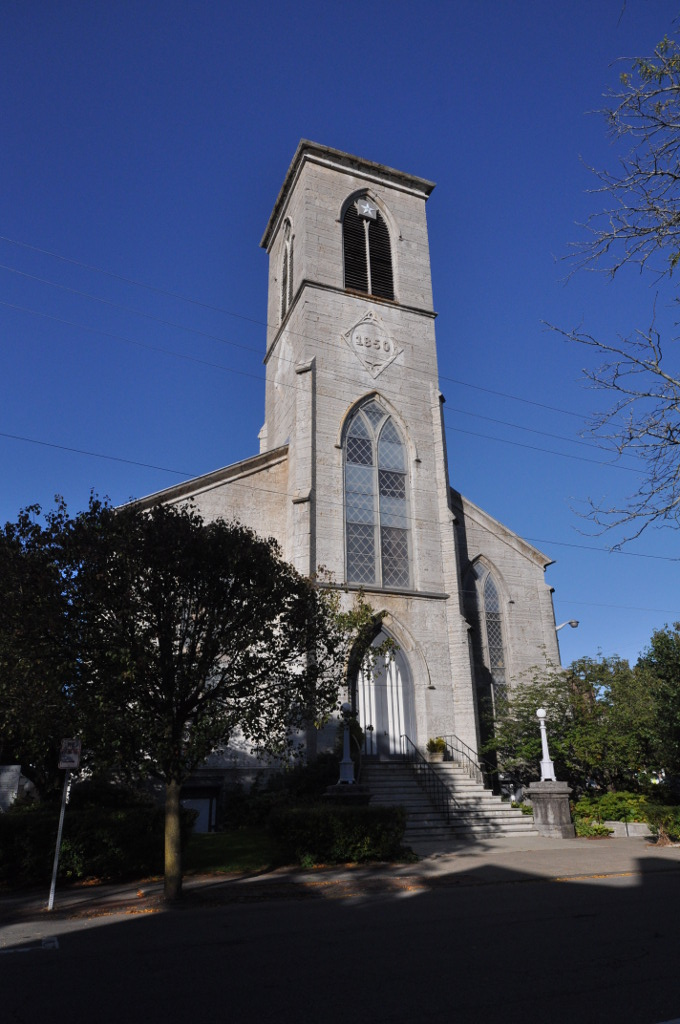
- Second Reformed Dutch Church, 2019

- Location within New York Location within the United States
- Location: 213-223 Fair St., Kingston, New York
- Coordinates: 41°55′53″N 74°1′5″W
- Area: less than one acre
- Built: 1850
- Architect: Thomas Thomas
- Architectural style: Gothic Revival
- NRHP reference No.: 01001393
- Added to NRHP: December 28, 2001

Second Reformed Dutch Church of Kingston is a historic Dutch Reformed church located at Kingston, Ulster County, New York. It was built in 1850, and is a meeting house form church building constructed of native limestone blocks in the Gothic Revival style. It features a monumental, buttressed central entry / bell tower rising several stories to a pyramidal roof.

It was listed on the National Register of Historic Places in 2001.

== See also ==
- Old Dutch Church, the First Reformed Protestant Dutch Church of Kingston
