= Judge Joseph Crockett House =

Historic house in Kentucky, United States

- U.S. National Register of Historic Places
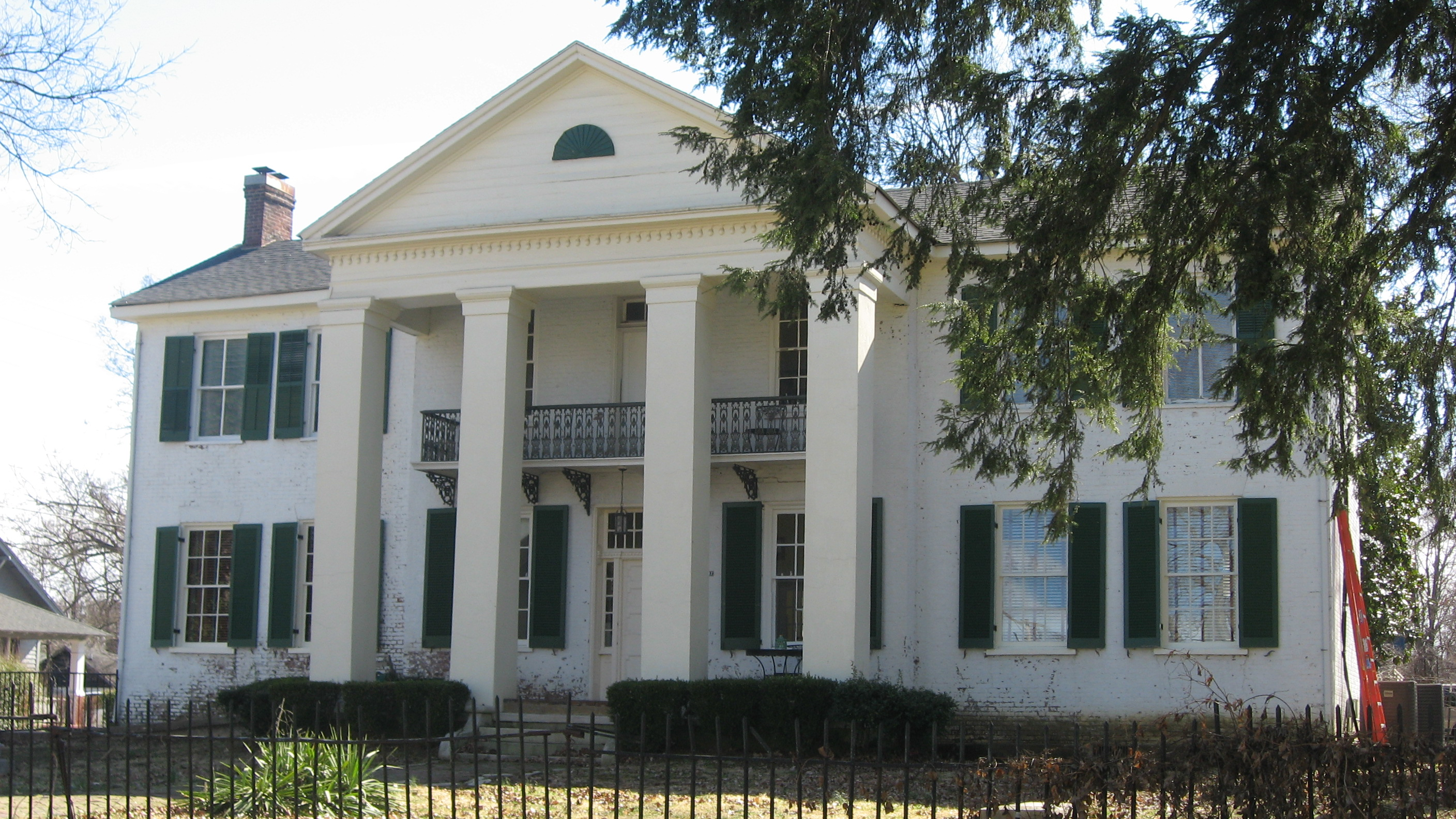
- Judge Joseph Crockett House in 2014
- Interactive map of Judge Joseph Crockett House
- Location: 317 East 16th Street; Hopkinsville, Kentucky 42240
- Coordinates: 36.860556°N 87.488333°W
- Built: 1834–1836
- Architect: Minard Lafever
- NRHP reference No.: 79000968
- Added to NRHP: April 3, 1979

Judge Joseph Crockett House, also known as Lone Oak, is a historic house located on the south side of East 16th Street in Hopkinsville, Kentucky. Based on a design by Minard Lafever, the house was constructed between 1834 and 1836. It is the only remaining structure from the first half of the nineteenth century in a neighborhood that has since developed into a late nineteenth-century residential area. The house represents the transition from the Federal Style architecture to the Greek Revival style. It is one of only three documented Temple Form Greek Revival houses ever built in Hopkinsville; one was torn down at the beginning of the 20th century, and the other survivor is the Dillard House (also from a design by Lafever). It is recognized for its architectural significance as one of the best-preserved examples of Greek Revival style in Hopkinsville.

The house was added to the National Register of Historic Places (NRHP) on April 3, 1979.

== History ==
The house was built by Judge Joseph B. Crockett (1808–1884), a prominent lawyer and politician who served in various capacities within local and state government in Christian County. At the time of its construction, Hopkinsville was still considered a frontier area. Crockett, who was born in Jessamine County, Kentucky, began his legal career after studying law under Charles Morehead, who later became Governor of Kentucky. In 1832, Crockett purchased 5.25 acres of land that was part of the original land grant from Bartholomew T. Wood, the founder of Hopkinsville.

Crockett and his wife, Caroline M. Bryan, moved into the house in 1835. During this period, Crockett was actively involved in politics, being re-elected to the Kentucky legislature around this same time. Approximately two years later, he served as Commonwealth Attorney for Christian County and eventually moved to St. Louis, where he continued his legal career and became the editor of a local newspaper, The Intelligencer. In 1868, he was appointed Chief Justice of the California Supreme Court, retiring in 1880.

In 1843, the Crockett family sold Lone Oak to Tandy H. Trice. In 1845, James F. Buckner, a former law partner of Crockett and a notable Whig politician, purchased the house. Buckner was an influential figure in Kentucky politics, serving in both the House of Representatives and the State Senate. He was known for his strong Unionist stance during the Civil War, which twice led to angry mobs with torches appearing at the house to protest Buckner and his Unionist views. He sold Lone Oak for $7,000 in 1865, and the property changed hands multiple times thereafter.

In 1880, Lone Oak was altered with the addition of two upstairs front rooms.

In 1919, Jemmie Courtney Hickman Thompson is rumored to have died in the home. There are varying stories and legends about her death, and there is no confirmation that her life ended in the house; however, employees and guests of the home have reported paranormal activity, leading some to claim the house is haunted by her. After Jemmie's death, the building changed owners and was the site of many businesses, including a bed and breakfast and nine different restaurants. The final restaurant at the location closed in the 1990s, and the house was unoccupied for another decade. In 2006, a retiree purchased the house with the intention of restoring it.

== Description ==
Lone Oak is a two-story, seven-bay brick house characterized by its Greek Revival architectural style. The façade features six-over-six pane windows with jack arches on the first floor, while the second-floor windows have been altered to two-over-two. A full-height, pedimented portico held by four stuccoed brick piers covers the three central bays, adorned with a shell design in the tympanum and pendant-like dentils on the entablature.

The interior of the house is notable for its unusual cross-axis entrance hall, deviating from the customary central passage found in similar structures of the period. The woodwork includes fluted door and window trim, panelled door jambs, and raised panel doors. The fireplaces in the west and east rooms feature distinct mantles, with the west room showcasing a more elaborate design.
