= T. Thomas and Son =

American architecture firm

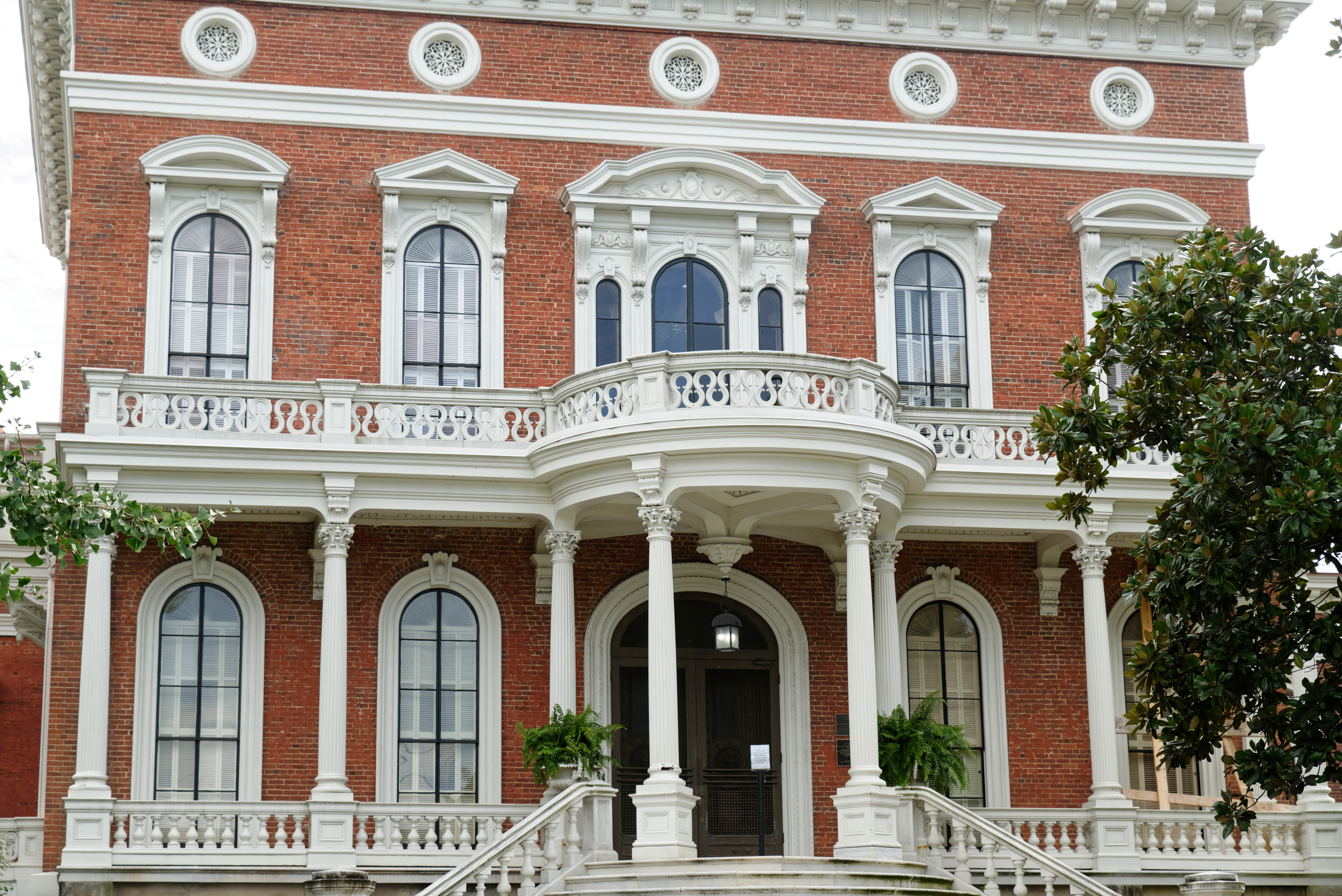
Johnston–Felton–Hay House in Macon, Georgia, designed by Thomas, a National Historic Landmark because of its architecture

T. Thomas and Son was the American architectural firm of Thomas Thomas and his son Griffith Thomas. The firm is known for designing the Italian palazzo style Hay House in the 1850s and the First Baptist Church in New Bern, North Carolina in 1848, an early non-Episcopalian Gothic Revival architecture church for North Carolina. A second Gothic church, planned in limestone for a Reformed Dutch congregation, was built to Thomas's designs in Kingston, New York, in 1850. Thomas was a founder of the American Association of Architects in 1837.
