= Salem Witch Museum =

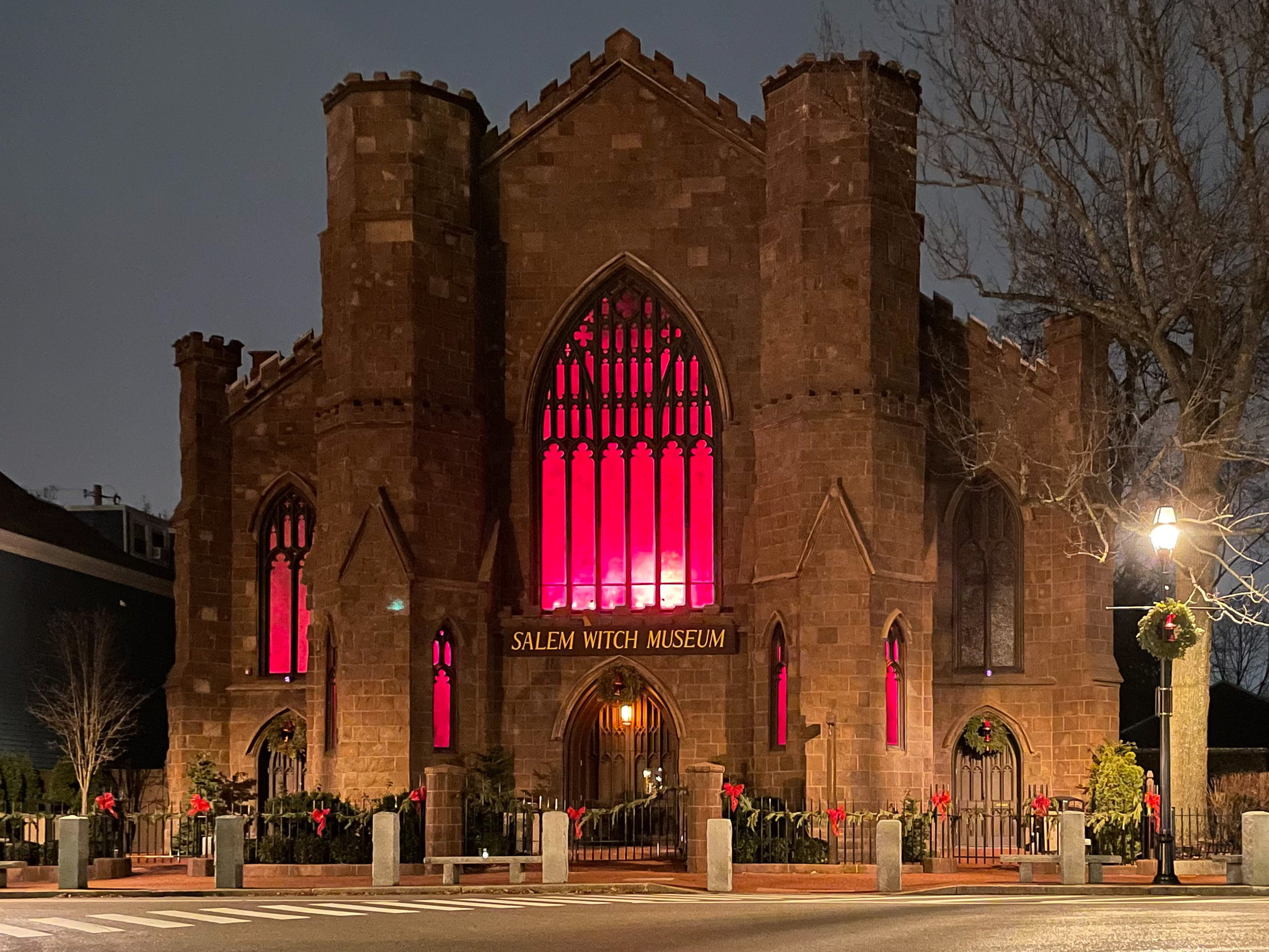
- Salem Witch Museum in January 2021
- Location: Salem, Massachusetts
- Coordinates: 42.5237448°N 70.8911625°W
- Type: Local museum
- Public transit access: Newburyport/Rockport Line Salem, MBTA
- Website: salemwitchmuseum.com

The Salem Witch Museum is a history museum located at 19 1/2 Washington Square North in downtown Salem, Massachusetts across from Salem Common. Founded in 1972, this non-traditional museum has told the story of the Salem witch trials for more than 50 years to millions of visitors from around the world. The museum features two multimedia exhibits along with artifacts and archived information pertaining to the history of witchcraft and Salem Witch Trials of 1692.

== Exhibits ==
The museum consists of two multimedia exhibits. The first presentation provides an immersive look into the events of 1692. Visitors experience the drama of that dark time though thirteen life-size stage sets, figures, lighting and narration as they are witness to the web of lies and intrigue of the Salem witch-hunt. The second exhibit, Witches: Evolving Perceptions, focuses on the meaning behind the word witch and evolution of the image of the witch over time. This presentation focuses on the European witchcraft trials and evolving image of the witch.

== History ==
Salem's elder minister, Reverend John Higginson, lived on this site with his family in the late seventeenth century. Though more moderate in his views than Salem’s younger assistant minister, Nicholas Noyes, Higginson took part in several examinations during the Salem witch trials, including the questioning of 4-year-old Dorothy Good and Mary Warren. Later, after the witchcraft trials were over, Higginson wrote the introduction to Hale’s Modest Enquiry into the Nature of Witchcraft, saying, “That whatever Errors or Mistakes we fell into, in the dark hour of Temptation that was upon us, may be (upon more light) so discovered, acknowledged and disowned by us, as that it may be matter of Warning & Caution to those that come after us, that they may not fall into the like.”

Living on this property with Reverend Higginson was his adult daughter Ann Dolliver, who was accused of witchcraft on June 6, 1692. Ten years before, she had married Gloucester fisherman William Dolliver, who subsequently deserted Ann and their three children. Ann returned penniless to Salem Town with her children to live with her father and stepmother. Arrested, jailed, and examined, Ann never came to trial and returned to live here with her family on the Salem Common. Sad and depressed, and, according to her father, “crazed in her understanding,” Ann battled melancholy for the rest of her life.

The Gothic Revival style building was constructed in the mid-nineteenth century as the new meeting space for Salem’s East Church. In 1718, the East Church split from the First Church of Salem, making this the first of five branches to split away from the original 1629 church. The East Church was originally housed in a meeting house on Essex Street, between Hardy and Bentley Streets. Reverend William Bentley was minister of the East Church from 1782 until his death in 1819. It is during this period that the church became Unitarian. Though the original wooden building on Essex Street was expanded in 1770, by the mid nineteenth century a new building was under construction, located just across the street from the Salem Common.

Constructed between 1844-1846, this building was designed by Minard Lafever (1798-1654), a New York architect renowned for his architectural design books. Skilled in the Gothic, Greek, Egyptian, and Italian Renaissance Revival styles, Lafever designed at least 20 churches in the United States. Gothic elements utilized in the design of the East Church building include the pointed-arch entrances, arched windows, and corner buttresses topped with battlements. The masons for this project were Henry Russell and Benjamin R. White, and the head carpenter was William Lummus. In 1899, the East Church and Barton Square Church merged to form the Second Church of Salem (alternatively referred to as the Second Unitarian Church of Salem). The church continued to meet in this building until the late 1947. In 1956, the Second Church reunited with the First Church, and the building was sold.

Three serious fires occurred in this building, in 1902, 1925, and 1969. According to oral tradition, one of the early fires was caused by lightening striking one of the octagonal towers, though this story is hard to verify. Whether the fire was caused by lightening or not, it is clear that the octagonal towers were reduced from their original height to their present size as a result of fire damage.

The building was next home to the Salem Auto Museum and Americana Shops from 1957-1969, which, according to the Lynn Daily Item, “housed one of the finest and largest collections of historical artifacts in the nation.” The museum also featured replicas of an old general store, a blacksmith’s shop, an ice cream parlor, an apothecary shop, as well as a 1903 Pierce Motorette, a 1908 Thomas Flyer, a 1910 Empire, a 1924 Rolls Royce, and a 1925 Mercedes, as well as early bicycles, tricycles, and motorcycles, and old hand-operated fire pumpers. On October 21, 1969, a fire broke out on the balcony, and spread upward into the attic. The fire, of undetermined origin, was battled from the early morning hours and was extinguished by daylight.

After a 1969 fire and renovations, the building's doors were opened once again in 1972, this time as the Salem Witch Museum. Since its 1972 opening, the Salem Witch Museum has educated community members and tourists on the Salem Witch Trials through its exhibits and community involvement. The creation of the Salem Witch Trials Memorial, which marks the 300 year anniversary of the event, was largely managed by the museum. Additionally, the museum collaborated with Salem's Chamber of Commerce to create Haunted Happenings in 1982, an annual Halloween festival.

== Tourism ==
The museum is often referenced as a tourist trap, with USA Today naming the museum as the second biggest tourist trap in the world as of May 2024 based on Google Review keywords. The Salem Witch Museum has been linked to a specific type of tourism, known as Dark Tourism due to its celebration of a dark topic in history. Regardless of its reputation, the museum is one of the few tourist sites in the city that offer an educational experience.
