= Johnston–Felton–Hay House =

Historic house in Georgia, United States

- Johnston-Hay House
- U.S. National Register of Historic Places
- U.S. National Historic Landmark
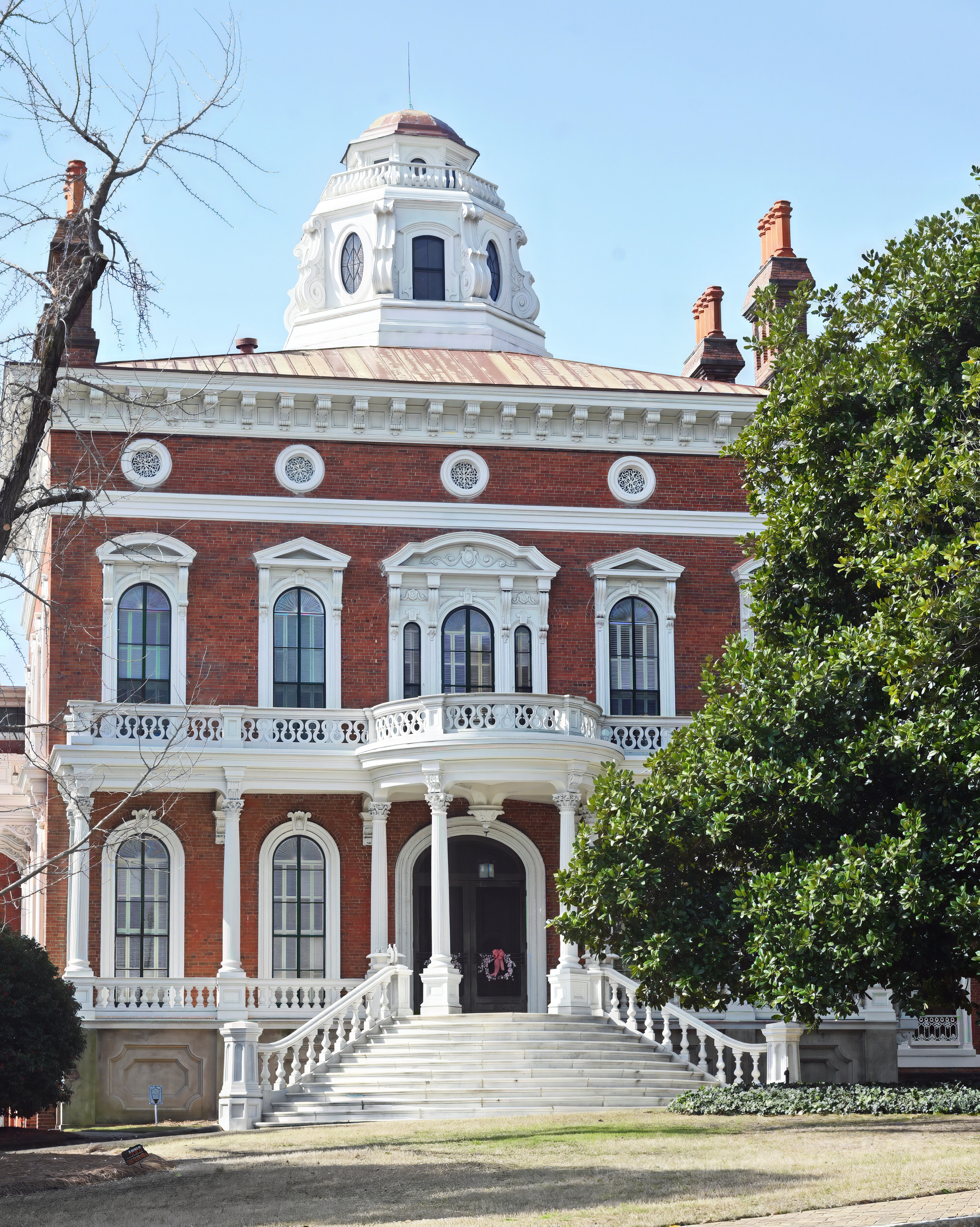
- The Johnston–Felton–Hay House in Macon was declared a National Historic Landmark in 1974.

- Location within Georgia Location within the United States
- Location: 934 Georgia Ave., Macon, Georgia
- Coordinates: 32.84034°N 83.63361°W
- Built: 1855
- Architect: T. Thomas and Son
- Architectural style: Italian Renaissance Revival
- NRHP reference No.: 71000259

Significant dates
- Added to NRHP: May 27, 1971
- Designated NHL: November 7, 1973

The Johnston–Felton–Hay House, often abbreviated Hay House, is a historic residence at 934 Georgia Avenue in Macon, Georgia. Built between 1855 and 1859 by William Butler Johnston and his wife Anne Tracy Johnston in the Italian Renaissance Revival style, the house has been called the "Palace of the South." The mansion sits atop Coleman Hill on Georgia Avenue in downtown Macon, near the Walter F. George School of Law, part of Mercer University. It was designated a National Historic Landmark in 1973 for its architectural uniqueness.

William Butler Johnston recorded in the Macon City Directory, 1860

The 18,000-square-foot (1,700 m^{2}), 24-room home was designed by the New York architect T. Thomas and Son. It was built in part by craftsman and artisans brought from Italy who were supervised by local master builder James B. Ayers. It has four levels and is crowned by a three-story cupola. Commissioned by imaginative owners and constructed by the most skillful workers of the time, its technological amenities were unsurpassed in the mid-nineteenth century: hot and cold running water, central heat, a speaker-tube system connecting 15 rooms, a French lift equivalent to today's elevator, in-house kitchen, and an elaborate ventilation system.

== History ==
Two families lived in Hay House, the first over four generations. Most of the home's present-day furnishings date from the Hay family's occupancy (1926–1962). A few pieces are from the Johnston family (1860–1896), most notably the Eastlake-style dining room suite. The most notable piece in the collection may be the 1857 marble statue, "Ruth Gleaning", by American expatriate sculptor Randolph Rogers.

The home was a place of comfort for the Johnston family and their daughters until the late 1800s. In 1896 after the death of Mrs. Johnston, their daughter Mary Ellen Felton and her husband lived in the home. The Feltons updated the plumbing and electricity and stayed in the home until the time of their deaths in 1926.

=== The Johnstons ===
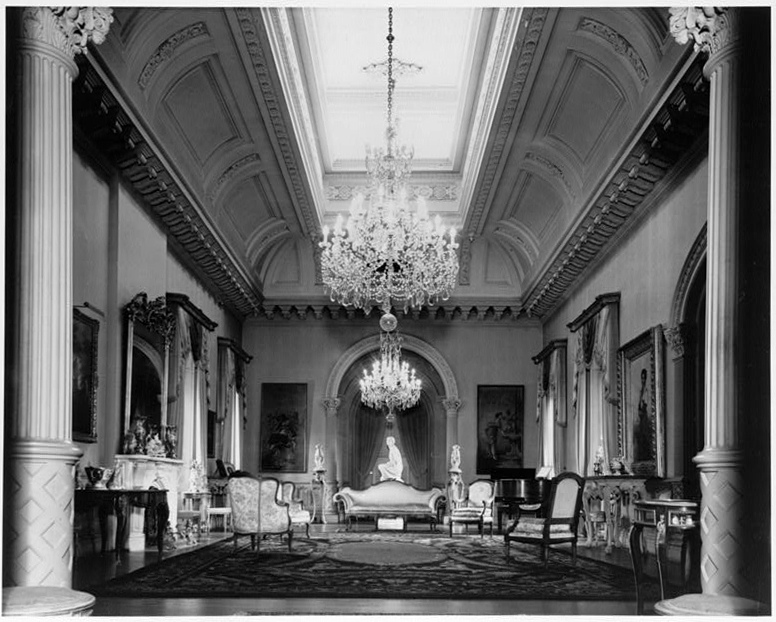
The Hay House living room Johnston-Felton-Hay House, Circa 1877

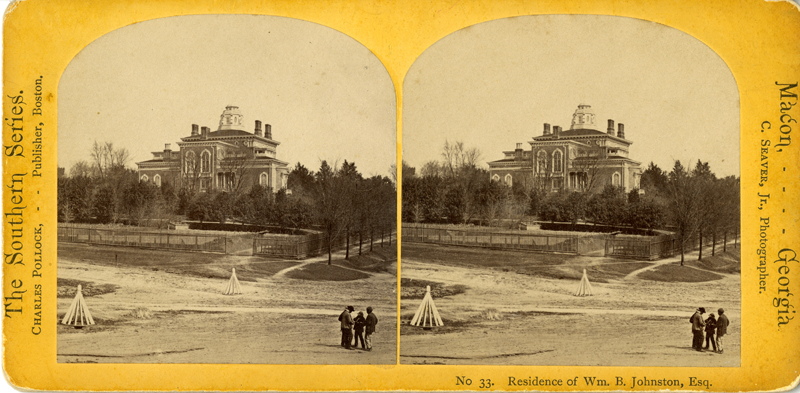
The Johnston-Felton-Hay House circa 1877

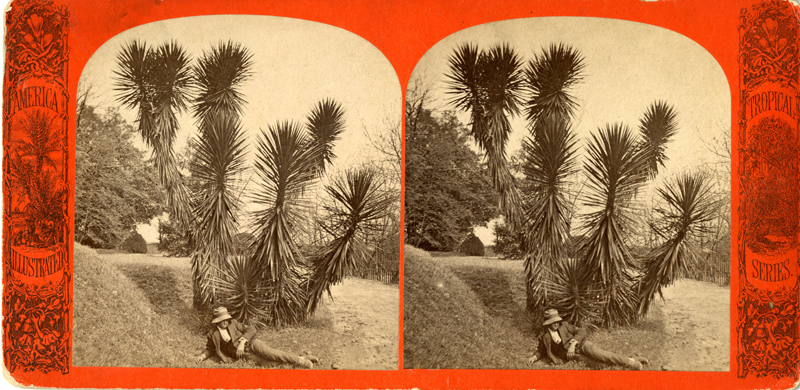
Image taken at Johnston-Hay House 1877

William Butler Johnston obtained his substantial wealth through investments in banking, railroads and public utilities rather than from the agrarian cotton economy. In 1851, he married Anne Clark Tracy, 20 years his junior, and the couple embarked on an extended honeymoon in Europe from 1852 to 1855. During their trip, the Johnstons visited hundreds of museums, historic sites and art studios. They collected fine porcelains, sculptures and paintings as mementos during their grand tour. Inspired by the Italian architecture they observed, the Johnstons constructed the monumental Italian Renaissance Revival mansion in Macon upon their return to America. Only two of the Johnstons' six children survived to adulthood. Caroline and Mary Ellen Johnston were born in 1862 and 1864, respectively, and grew up in the house on Georgia Avenue.

=== The Feltons ===
After the death of Mrs. Johnston in 1896, daughter Mary Ellen and her husband, Judge William H. Felton, lived in the house. They remodeled and redecorated parts of the house, updated the plumbing and added electricity. Their only child, William Hamilton Felton Jr., was born in 1889. He married Luisa Macgill Gibson in 1915, and the newlywed couple soon moved in with the Feltons. They and their two sons, William Hamilton Felton III and George Gibson Felton, lived in the house until 1926.

=== The Hays ===
After the deaths of William Sr. and Mary Ellen Felton, the house was sold to Parks Lee Hay and his wife, Maude. After purchasing, the Hays redecorated the entire home, updating it to fit the new twentieth-century décor. The home was seen as a local landmark to all in middle Georgia. Mr. Hay died in 1957, and Mrs. Hay died in 1962.

== Present day ==
Following Mrs. Hay's death, her heirs established the P.L. Hay Foundation and operated the house as a private house museum. By virtue of its national architectural significance, Hay House was declared a National Historic Landmark in 1974. In 1977, the ownership and operation of the house was formally transferred to The Georgia Trust for Historic Preservation to ensure its long-term preservation.

In 2000, the White House Millennium Council designated Hay House an Official Project of Save America's Treasures in 2000. Today, Hay House is one of Macon's most popular tourist attractions with 20,000 visitors each year. The house is also a prominent rental venue for special events.

=== Hay House campaign ===
Recently, the Georgia Trust for Historic Preservation which oversees the management and maintenance of Hay House embarked on a successful $7.6 million capital campaign for the restoration and maintenance of the building. Of the money raised in the capital campaign, $3.5 million was earmarked to establish an endowment for ongoing maintenance. A need of $17.5 million has been identified to fund a complete restoration of the Hay House and permanently endow all future maintenance and management.

The Georgia Trust for Historic Preservation received a number of donations and grants including a grant from the Institute of Museum and Library Services, a grant from the National Endowment of the Arts, and an Architectural Conservation grant from the Getty Foundation.

=== Restoration ===
Today, Hay House is open to visitors. Tours are held daily. Some of the plants in the landscaping of the home date back to the 19th century. Renovations continue to occur to keep Hay House up to date. Upcoming projects include a redesign of the gift shop, including new insulation, and writing specifications for mortar repairs outside of the building. Half of the money raised in the capital campaign was allocated for restoration of the exterior, cupola, and most public rooms of the house. Other restoration efforts include repairing the porch and stairs, masonry, and window and door shutter; conserving the stained glass; installing UV protection on windows; restoring the ground floor, attic, and cupola; lighting the 8,000-gallon water tank interior to illustrate the technological innovations of the house; conserving the collections of paintings and porcelain; and repairing the exterior grounds. Original furnishings and decorations in the downstairs rooms are also being researched in order to accurately restore the wall coverings, paint finishes, and furniture upholstery to their appearance during the Hay family's residency in the house.

== Popular culture ==
The house served as the filming location for the debutante ball scene in Borat Subsequent Moviefilm.

== Gallery ==
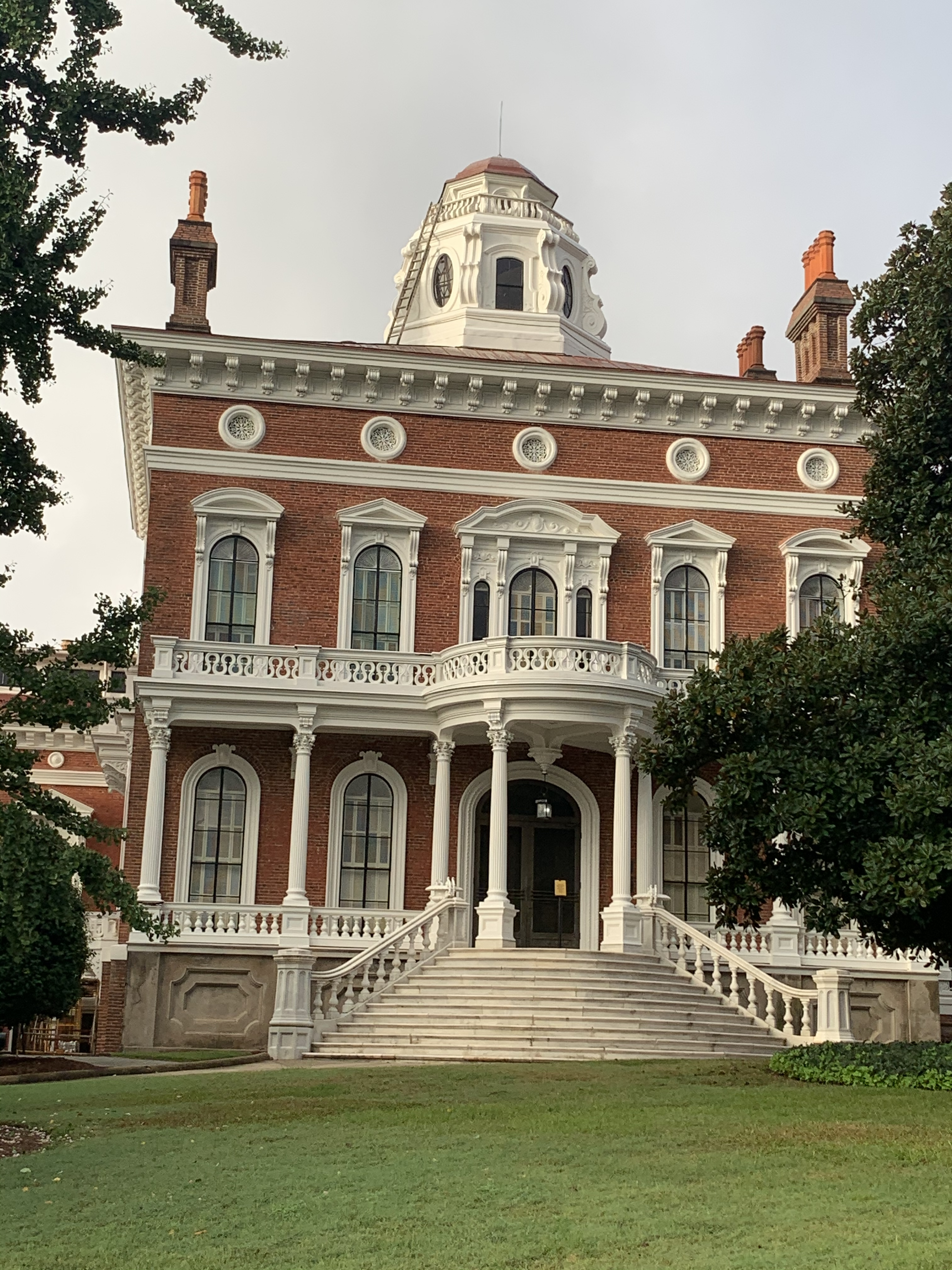

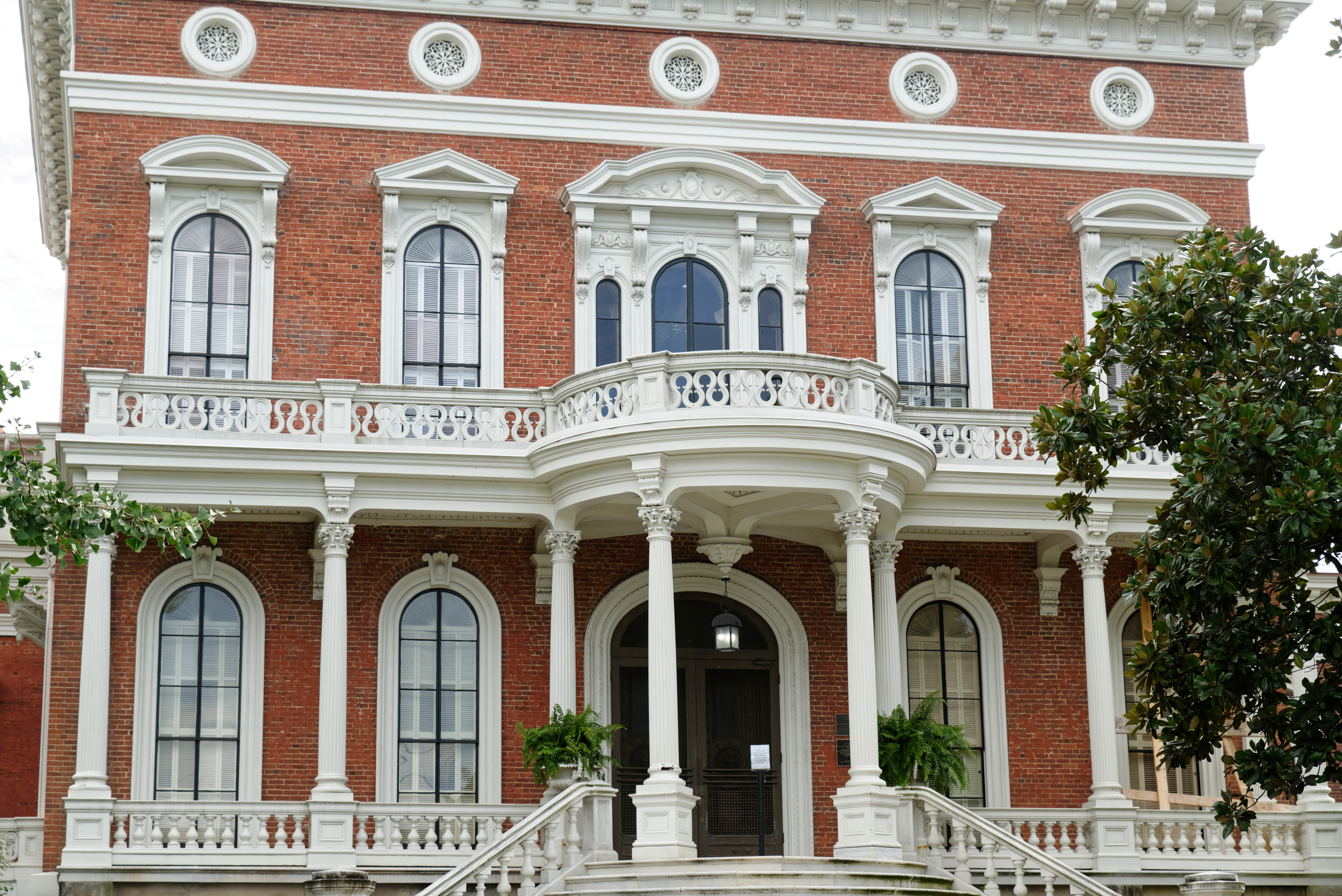
2018

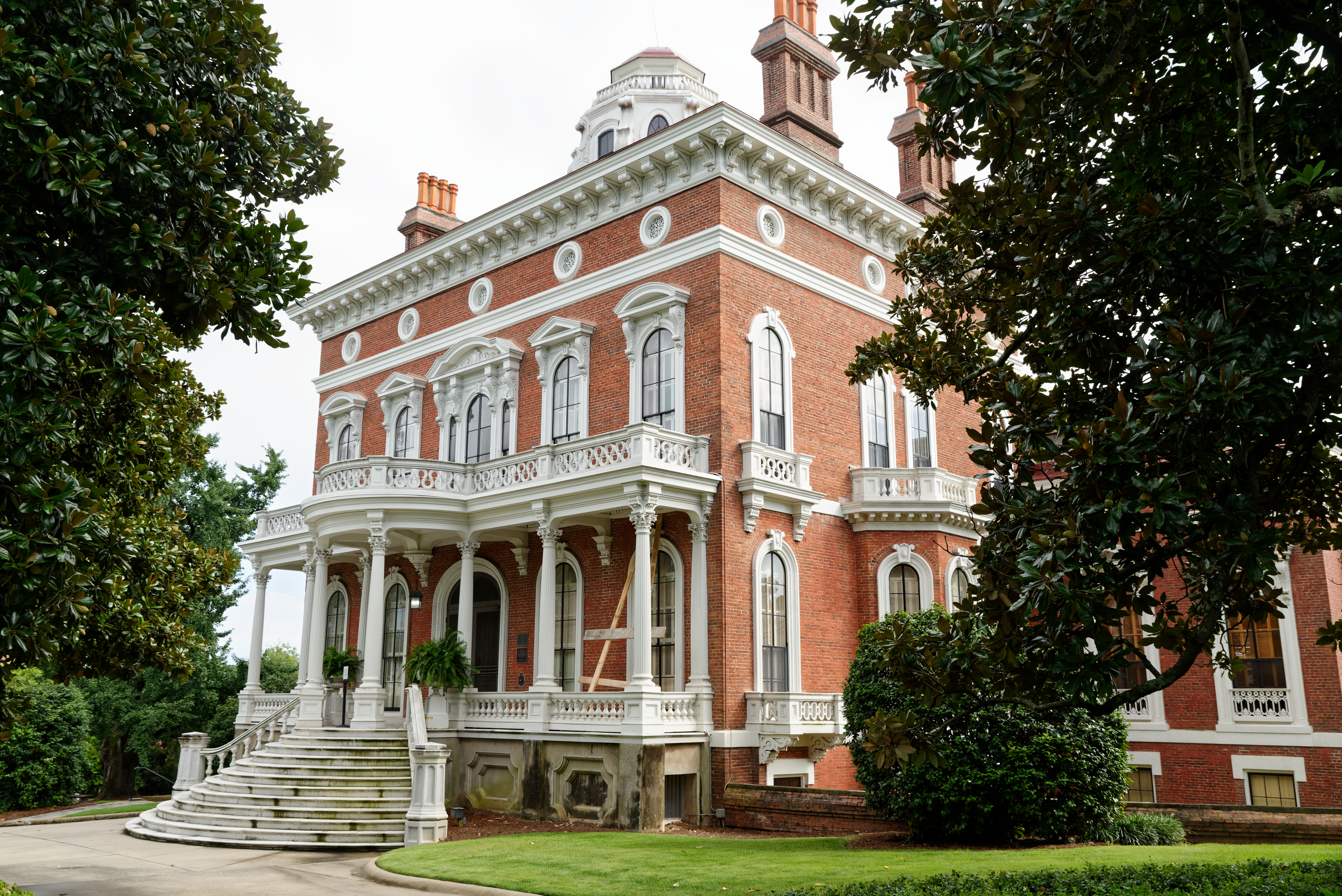
2018

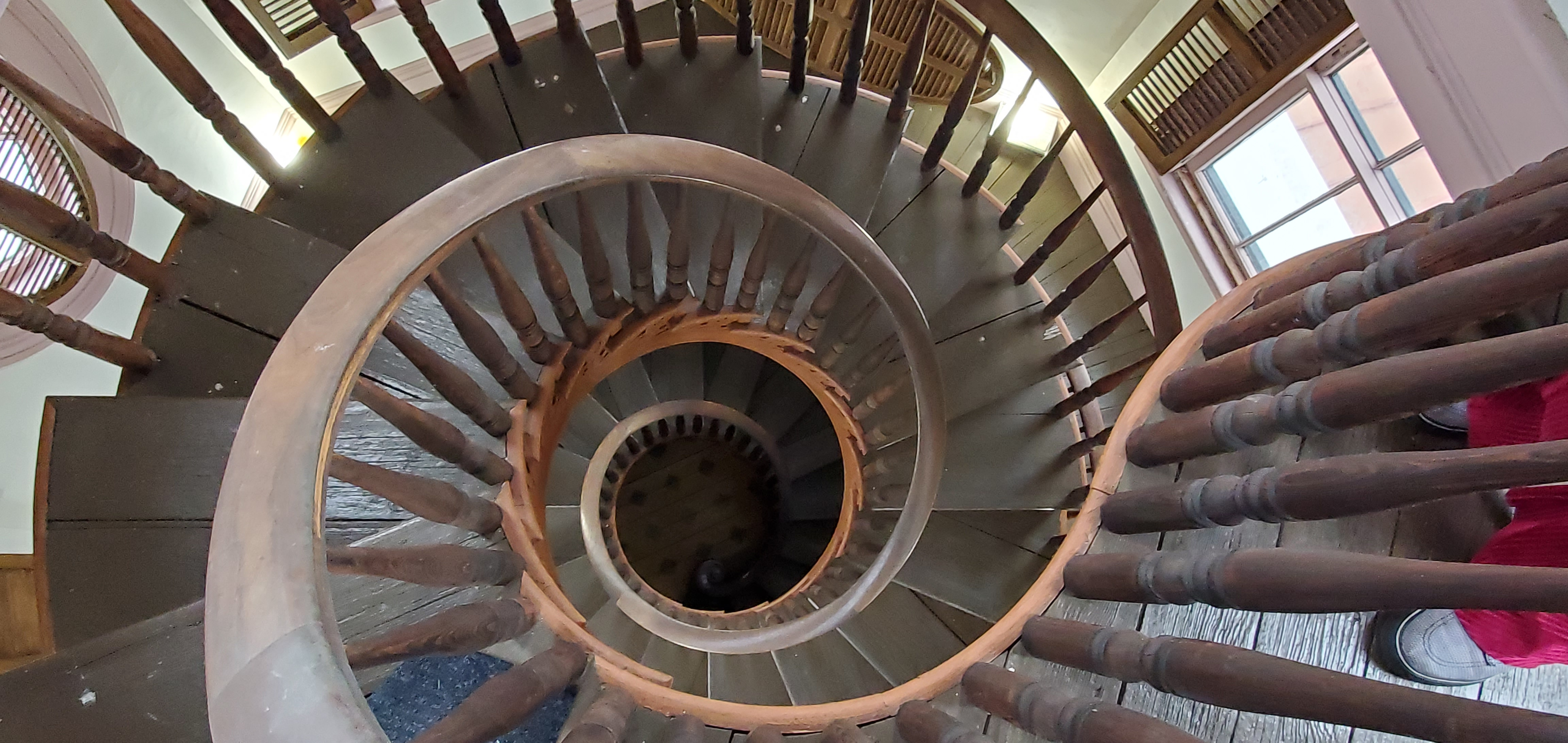
Spiral staircase from cupola - February 2022

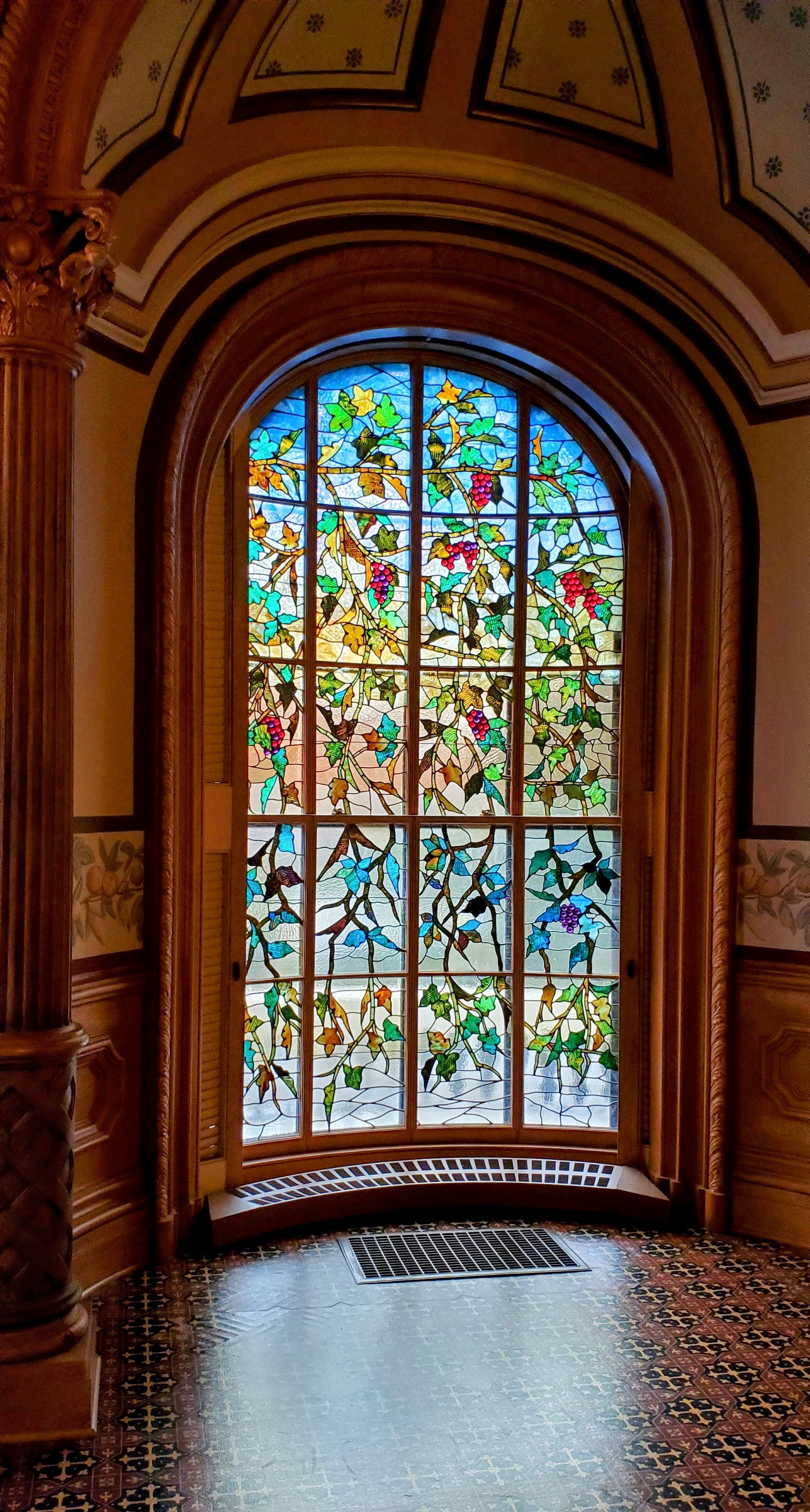
Stained-glass window - February 2022

== See also ==
- Georgia Trust for Historic Preservation
- List of National Historic Landmarks in Georgia (U.S. state)
- National Register of Historic Places listings in Bibb County, Georgia
- Rhodes Hall
