= Old Whaler's Church (Sag Harbor) =

Historic church in New York, United States

- First Presbyterian Church
- U.S. National Register of Historic Places
- U.S. National Historic Landmark
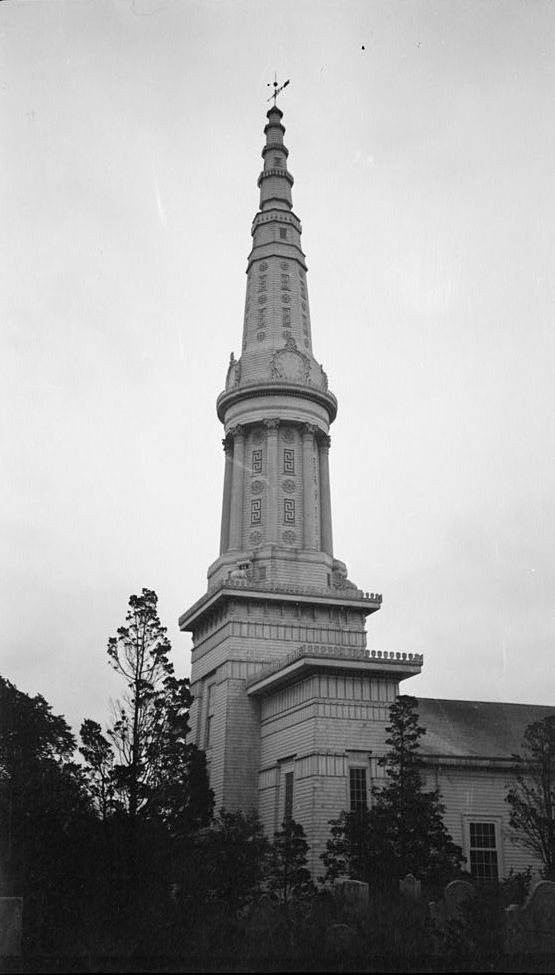
- The First Presbyterian Church with steeple (before 1938)

- Location within New York Location within the United States
- Location: 44 Union Street, Sag Harbor, NY
- Coordinates: 40°59′50″N 72°17′37″W
- Built: 1844
- Architect: Minard Lafever
- Architectural style: Egyptian Revival, Greek Revival
- NRHP reference No.: 94001194

Significant dates
- Added to NRHP: April 19, 1994
- Designated NHL: April 19, 1994

First Presbyterian Church in Sag Harbor, New York, also known as Old Whaler's Church, is a historic and architecturally notable Presbyterian church built in 1844 in the Egyptian Revival style. The church is Sag Harbor's "most distinguished landmark." The facade has been described as "the most important (surviving) example of Egyptian revival style in the United States," and "the best example of the Egyptian Revival style in the U.S. today.

The church was designed by Minard Lafever in an Egyptian Revival style that includes Greek Revival elements. With its original steeple, 185 feet high, it was the tallest structure on Long Island when built. The steeple was destroyed by the Great New England Hurricane of 1938. Although many lament the loss, architectural historian Richard Carrot believes that the removal of the steeple was "successful", in that it left "a more 'Egyptian' building."

The church is located at 44 Union Street, within the historic Sag Harbor Village District, and was declared a National Historic Landmark in 1994. It is the only such landmark in Sag Harbor.

== Architecture ==
The church's tripartite facade evokes the massive trapezoidal pylons of Egyptian temples. The deep cornice is crested with a crenelation of blubber spades, referring to the whaling industry that created the wealth of the village.

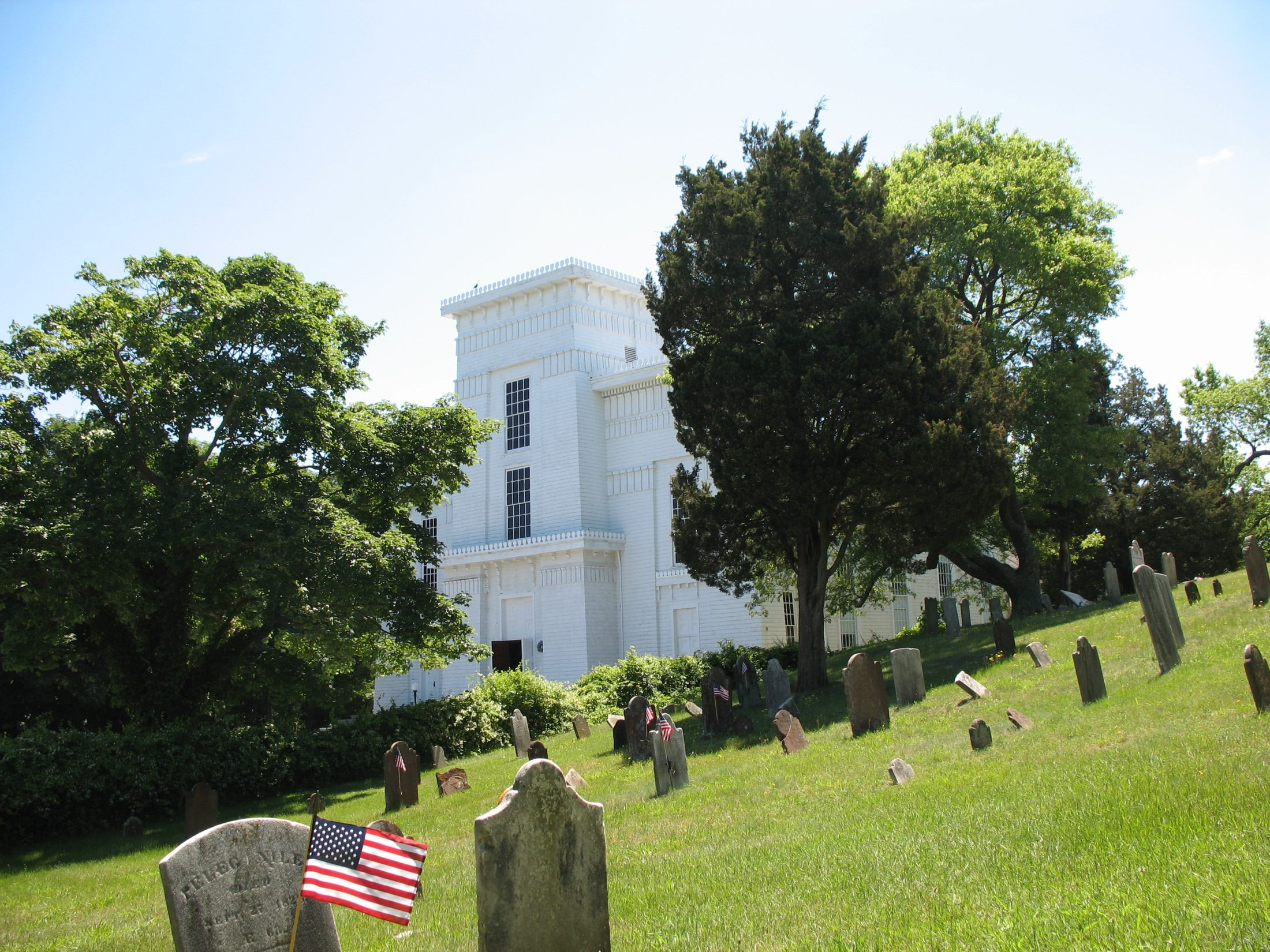
Church without steeple and Old Burying Ground.

The minister's dedicatory sermon said that the congregation's intention in commissioning an Egyptian-style building was to symbolize Solomon's Temple.

The foyer features trapezoidal Egyptian Revival doors. The original bell is preserved in the narthex. It was taken out and rung for the building's 100th anniversary in 1944, during World War II. The church also celebrated the anniversary by putting on a grand historical pageant in the costumes of the 1840s. As many local young men were stationed overseas, they sang a song from 1849, when many local men left for the California Gold Rush: "Star of Peace to Wanderers Weary." The service was broadcast by radio over the Voice of America as an example of the Four Freedoms.

The interior of the sanctuary is entirely in ornate Greek Revival style. It is spacious, with a capacity to seat 800. The pulpit is framed by a pair of pilasters and a pair of Corinthian columns that rise over 50 feet to a coffered ceiling. Trompe-l'œil behind the pulpit gives the impression of a curved wall. The old-fashioned box pews have Cuban mahogany railings. Many have hand-engraved, 19th-century silver nameplates on the doors, when families "bought" some boxes. Fluted columns support galleries on each side of the sanctuary. The coffered ceiling is supported from a central beam, eliminating the need for supporting columns. It is edged with egg-and-dart molding.

A fence along Union Street is built with Egyptian obelisk-shaped fence posts. It is a modern copy of the original fence, which was removed in the 1880s. The fence was an important part of Lafever's original plan to replicate Solomon's Temple in Egyptian style. The plan of the original Temple had a forecourt. Worshippers would pass two great pillars, named Boaz and Jachin, before passing into the sanctuary. In Lafever's design, the fence marked the "forecourt", and the doorway is framed by two enormous pylons representing Boaz and Jachin.

=== Steeple ===
The church was originally topped with a steeple 185 feet tall, making it visible to ships rounding Montauk Point about 21 miles away by road. The church was the tallest building on Long Island when it opened. The steeple was designed in three upward tapering sections. At the base was an octagonal Greek revival colonnade in which a bell hung. This was a replica of the 4th century BC Choragic Monument of Lysicrates. Above this was a section with four panels, each with Greek key and rosette motifs, which contained clockworks made by Ephriam Byram, Sag Harbor's clockmaker. The clock was removed in 1845 since the area's high winds, which powered the town's many windmills, caused vibrations that made the clock run inaccurately. The slender top spire supported a weather vane.

In the late 1800s, George Sterling and his best friend Roosevelt Johnson climbed to the top of the steeple one Saturday night and nailed a homemade pirate's flag to the top. Churchgoers were shocked to see it Sunday morning, and tried to identify the perpetrators, but could not. The flag flew for a week before a professional steeplejack was hired to remove it.

The steeple was destroyed during the Great Hurricane of 1938. Fundraising to replace the steeple began in 1952. In 1997 a proposal was floated to raise the necessary funds by installing a cell-phone transmission tower inside the new steeple, to be paid for by the cell phone company. In 2000, the cost of restoring the steeple was estimated at $2,000,000.

== History ==
The first building of the First Presbyterian Church of Sag Harbor was erected in 1766. Known as the "Old Barn Church", it was a "simple building of uncouth shape," a wood-frame building with walls and a roof, but neither a ceiling nor interior plastered walls. According to the Rev. Nathaniel S. Prime, pastor from 1806–09, "If a shower of rain occurred during public worship, the minister was obliged to retreat to the corner of the ample pulpit to escape the falling drops."

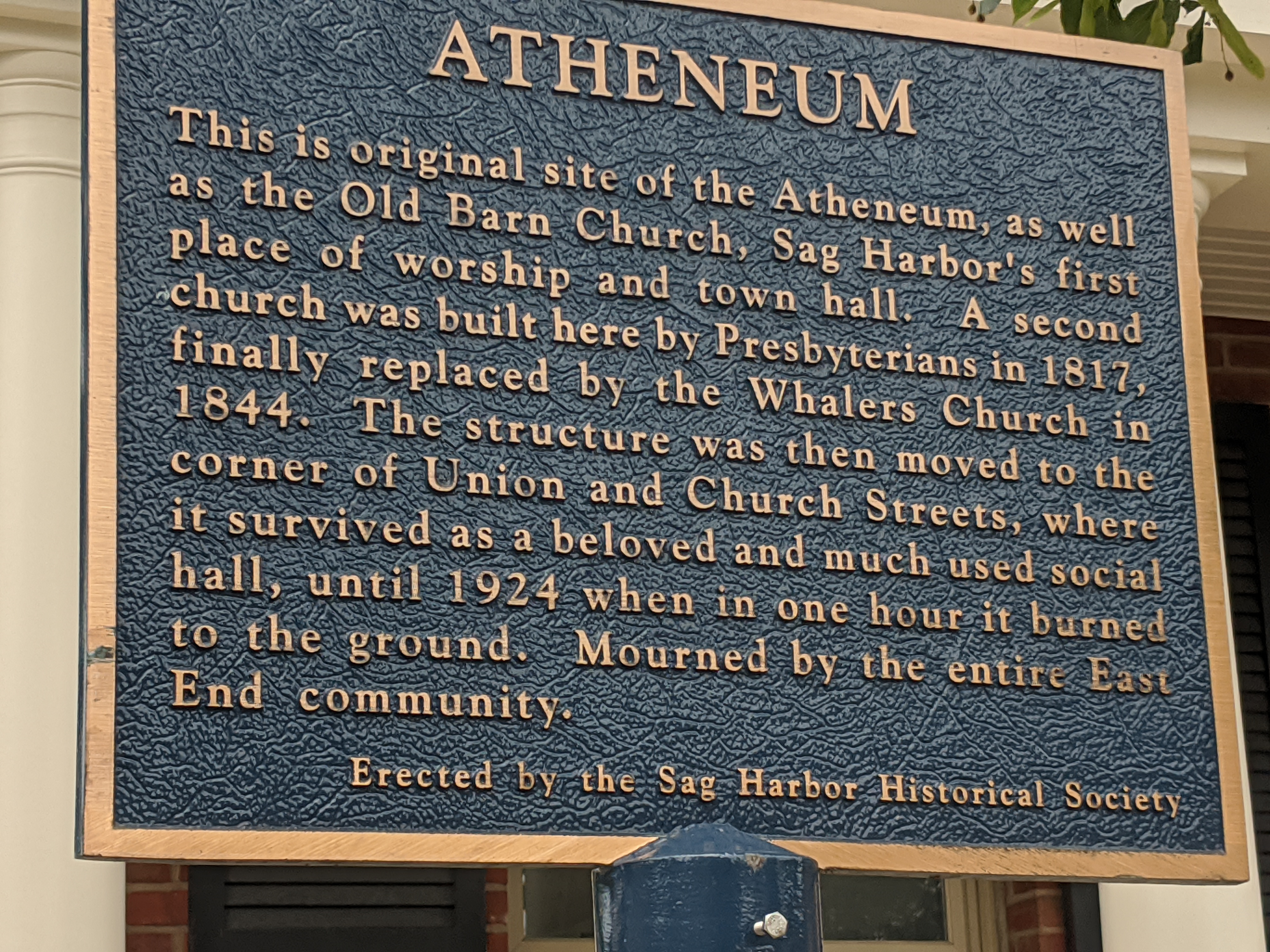
Marker at 43 Church st, Sag harbor - for the Old Barn Church, called the Atheneum

The "Old Barn Church" was torn down and a second church built in 1816, using lumber recycled from the old building. When the 1816 building became too small, as the congregation expanded through the Second Great Awakening, the present building was built in 1844. The plot of land cost $2,000 and the congregation spent $17,000 on the building, before it was furnished.

The church was named a National Historic Landmark by the U.S. Department of the Interior in 1994. The congregation hopes someday to reconstruct the steeple.

The 1816 building was sold for other uses. Known as "the Atheneum," it was used as a community lecture hall and theater. It burned down on April 30, 1924.

=== Restoration ===
In 1950 when the ceiling was found to be unsafe, the church had to be closed for many months. It was reopened in July 1952 after thorough repairs. The "modern" electric lighting fixtures were removed and replaced with a chandelier and sidelights designed to look like the church's original whale-oil burning fixtures.

Another restoration, beginning in the 1990s, received state funding because of the building's historic significance. During this period the church documented that Minard Lafever had designed the 19th-century building. A letter was found, written by a young cabinetmaker working on the building in 1843, who named Lafever as the architect. This confirmation aided in gaining financial support for the church's restoration, based on its architectural significance. Given documentation of the architect, and with other restoration money for structural repairs, church administrators believed they would be able to raise funds to restore the steeple.

== Modern use ==
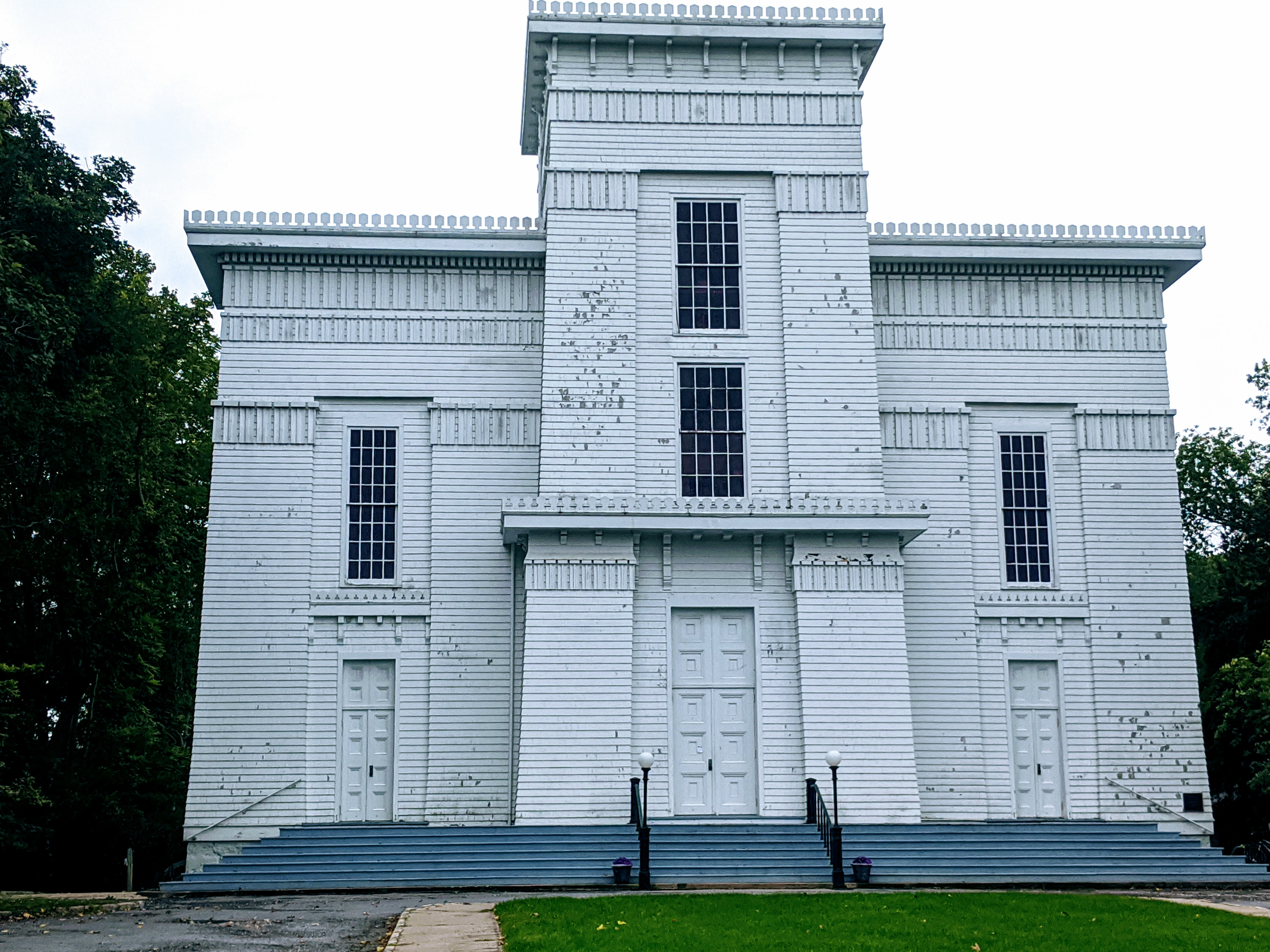
Historic Church on the National Historic Landmark register, Sag harbor - Egyptian revival style

The church continues to be used by the First Presbyterian congregation, which meets on Sunday morning.

== See also ==
- Egyptian Revival architecture
