= Minard Lafever =

American architect (1798–1854)

- Born: August 10, 1798 near Morristown, New Jersey
- Died: September 26, 1854 (aged 56)
- Occupation: Architect
- Buildings: First Presbyterian Church (Sag Harbor), St. Ann and the Holy Trinity Church

Minard Lafever (1798–1854) was an American architect of churches and houses in the United States in the early nineteenth century.

== Life and career ==
Lafever began life as a carpenter around 1820. At this period in the United States there were no professional schools of architecture and few who claimed the title architect. Most structures were designed and put up by builders, and architects and builders were trained by working under master builders.

In 1829 Lafever published The Young Builders' General Instructor, followed by Modern Builders' Guide in 1833, The Beauties of Modern Architecture in 1835 and The Architectural Instructor in 1850. His pattern books were influential in spreading his Greek Revival style.

Five of his buildings were designated National Historic Landmarks in the 20th and 21st centuries:

- Judge Joseph Crockett House
- First Presbyterian Church (Sag Harbor) (tall steeple destroyed in a hurricane)
- Old Dutch Church (Kingston, NY) , First Reformed Protestant Dutch Church of Kingston
- St. Ann and the Holy Trinity Church
- Sailors' Snug Harbor

Other notable buildings include:

- Benjamin Huntting House, now the Sag Harbor Whaling Museum
- Church of the Holy Apostles (New York, New York) listed on the National Register of Historic Places
- Strong Place Baptist Church, Cobble Hill, Brooklyn (1851–52)
- First Unitarian Church AKA Church of the Savior, Brooklyn Heights Historic District 1844
- Rutgers Presbyterian Church (Rutgers Street, Lower East Side, New York, New York) 1843
- East Church (Salem, Massachusetts) now the Salem Witch Museum, 1844-1846

One of his most successful acolytes was John F. Rague, who designed and built the 1837 Old Capitol of Illinois and the 1840 Territorial Capitol of Iowa.

== Pattern books ==
Lafever wrote five pattern books that were influential in spreading his Greek Revival style, most notably "The Modern Builder's Guide" (1833) and "The Beauties of Modern Architecture" (1835). The Greek Revival Government Street Presbyterian Church in Mobile, Alabama is a National Historic Landmark that was designed using many of the latter book's detailed guidelines. That church's tall steeple, like the steeple of Lafever's First Presbyterian Church in Sag Harbor, was destroyed in a hurricane.

Other historic structures built using Lafever's designs include Rose Hill Mansion, a National Historic Landmark in western New York, which was built in the style of a two-story Greek temple with Ionic columns in 1837. Two mansions in the Boston Post Road Historic District— the 1838 Peter Augustus Jay House and Lounsberry— were built using Lafever's designs, and greatly resemble illustrated plates found within Lafever's books. Rose Glen, an antebellum plantation house near Sevierville, Tennessee, was modeled after Lafever's "Design for a Country Villa," which appeared as the frontispiece in both The Modern Builder's Guide and The Beauties of Modern Architecture.

Lafever did not confine himself to a single style. His St. James' Church, New York on James Street near Madison Street in Manhattan (1837) is Greek Revival as is his building for Sailors' Snug Harbor, his First Presbyterian Church (Sag Harbor) (1844) is Egyptian Revival, his brownstone St. Ann and the Holy Trinity Church at Montague and Clinton Streets in Brooklyn Heights (1847) is Gothic Revival and his Church of the Holy Apostles at Ninth Avenue and 28th Street in Manhattan (1848–1854) is Romanesque/Italianate.

His last commission was the Packer Collegiate Institute in Brooklyn, which opened in 1854. The Packer building is in Tudor Gothic style, with 30 schoolrooms, and a two-story-high chapel on the third floor. It has two towers of different size, and the “off-center arrangement of two large peaked gables, give the school the exterior appearance of picturesque irregularity common to the Gothic revival.” However, the interior is compact and symmetrical, with long crossed hallways dividing the building into quadrants. Architectural historian Andrew Dolkart calls Lafever’s design of Packer "one of the earliest and most sophisticated evocations of English-inspired Collegiate Gothic, creating the educational atmosphere of Oxford and Cambridge."

A list of his churches, extant and not, and a well-researched biography is included in a 2006 nomination for First Reformed Protestant Dutch Church of Kingston.

== Books by Minard Lafever ==
- The Young Builder's General Instructor,1829
- The Modern Builder's Guide,1833
- The Beauties of Modern Architecture, 1835
- The Modern Practice of Staircase and Handrail Construction,1838
- The Architectural Instructor,1856

== Sources ==
- The Architecture of Minard Lafever, Jacob Landy, 1970.
