= List of Scripps National Spelling Bee champions =

US spelling competition winners

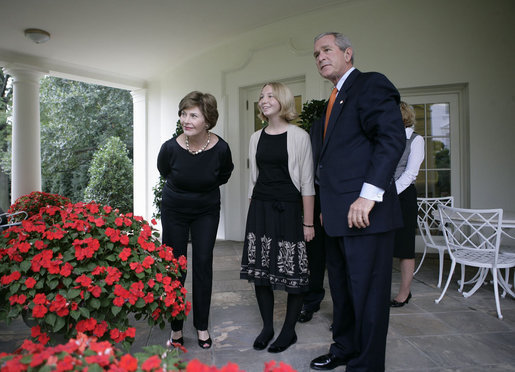
Kerry Close, the winner of the 2006 Bee, meeting President George W. Bush and his wife Laura at the White House after her victory

The Scripps National Spelling Bee (formerly the Scripps Howard National Spelling Bee and commonly called the National Spelling Bee) is an annual spelling bee held in the United States. The competition began in 1925, and was initially organized by The Courier-Journal of Louisville, Kentucky, until the Scripps Howard Broadcasting Company (now the E. W. Scripps Company) assumed sponsorship in 1941. Every speller in the competition has previously participated in a local spelling bee, usually organized by a local newspaper.

The first champion was Frank Neuhauser of Louisville, who beat eight other finalists to win the inaugural competition. He was honored with a parade in his hometown, where and when he was presented with bouquets of gladioli in commemoration of the winning word "gladiolus", and returned to the Bee a number of times as a guest of honor. The first girl to win was Pauline Bell, also of Louisville, the following year. Girls won nine consecutive competitions from 1932 to 1940. Joint winners have been crowned on seven occasions in the Bee's history. The first such occurrence was in 1950, when Colquitt Dean and Diana Reynard were declared co-champions after the contestants exhausted the list of available words. In both 1957 and 1962 joint champions were declared when both remaining contestants spelled the same word incorrectly. After three consecutive ties from 2014 to 2016, a written tiebreaker round was introduced, but it was discontinued for the 2019 Bee, which subsequently resulted in an unprecedented eight-way tie when the organizers ended the final session after the remaining contestants had completed five consecutive perfect rounds.

Although the competition is titled "National," it is not restricted to spellers from the United States. In 1998, Jody-Anne Maxwell from Jamaica became the first speller from outside the U.S. to win the Bee, as well as the first black winner. In recent decades the competition has been dominated by Indian-American students. Although people of South Asian origin make up less than one percent of the U.S. population, the vast majority of the winners since 1999, including all 14 champions between 2008–2018 and seven of the eight co-champions in 2019, have come from the South Asian community. One such speller, Nihar Janga from Austin, Texas, became the youngest champion in the Bee's history when he won the title in 2016 at the age of 11. The 93rd Scripps National Spelling Bee in 2021 was the first time an African-American speller (Zaila Avant-garde) became the champion and only the second time that the champion was a black person.

The competition was not held from 1943 to 1945 because of World War II. The 2020 competition was canceled due to concerns about the COVID-19 pandemic.

On May 29, 2025, returning entrant Faizan Zaki of Allen, Texas, who was first runner-up in 2024, won the 2025 Scripps National Spelling Bee title and trophy over 242 other contestants, including runner-up Sarvadnya Kadam of Visalia, California. This year marked the 100th anniversary of the spelling competition which began on June 17, 1925. Forty-two former National Spelling Bee winners returned to attend the centennial celebration, the earliest two from 1960 (Henry Feldman) and 1961 (John Capehart) to then-reigning champion Bruhat Soma (2024). The 2026 Scripps National Spelling Bee finals were held in Washington, D.C. at DAR Constitution Hall.

== Champions ==
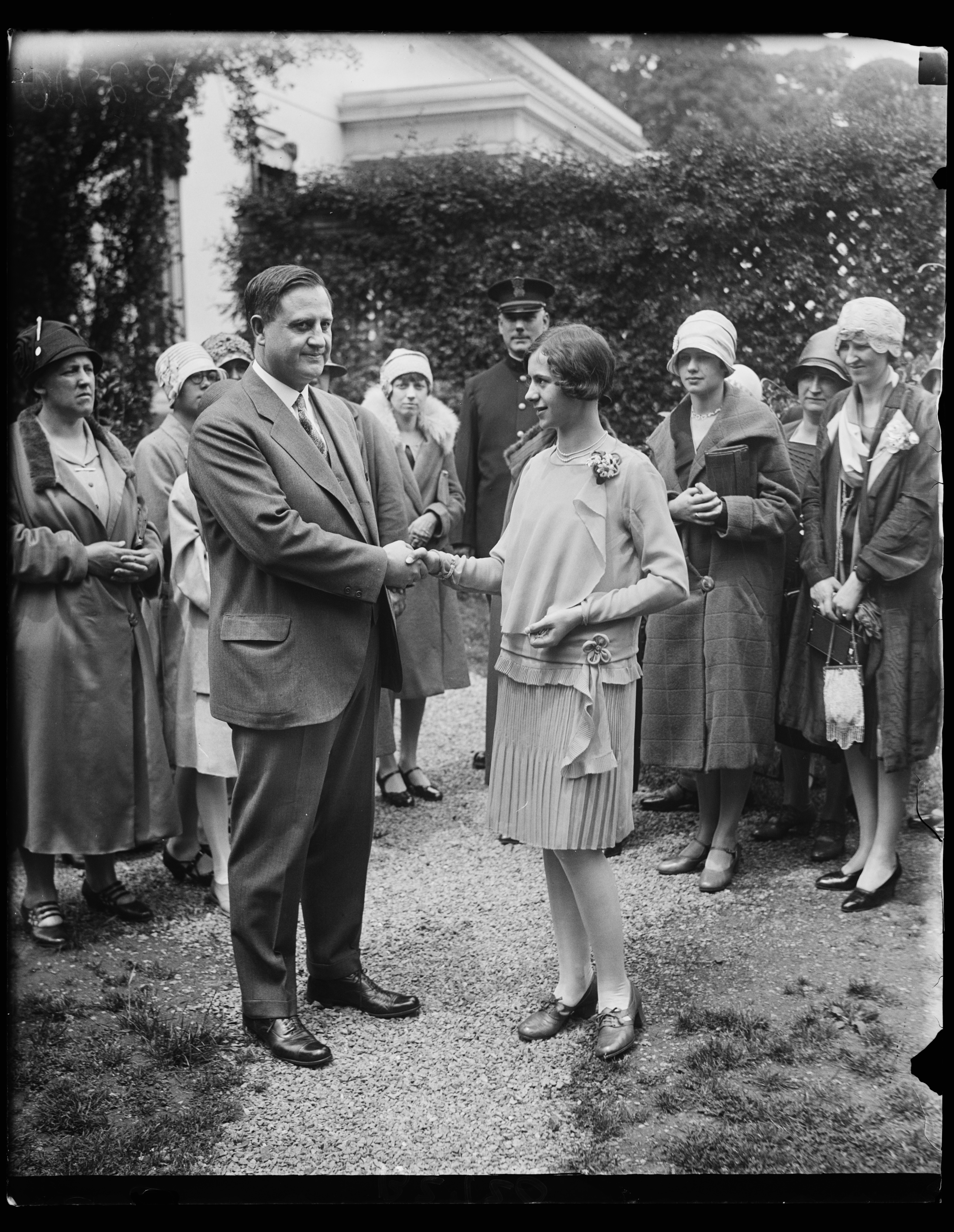
The Secretary to the President, Everett Sanders congratulating Betty Robinson, the winner of the 1928 Bee

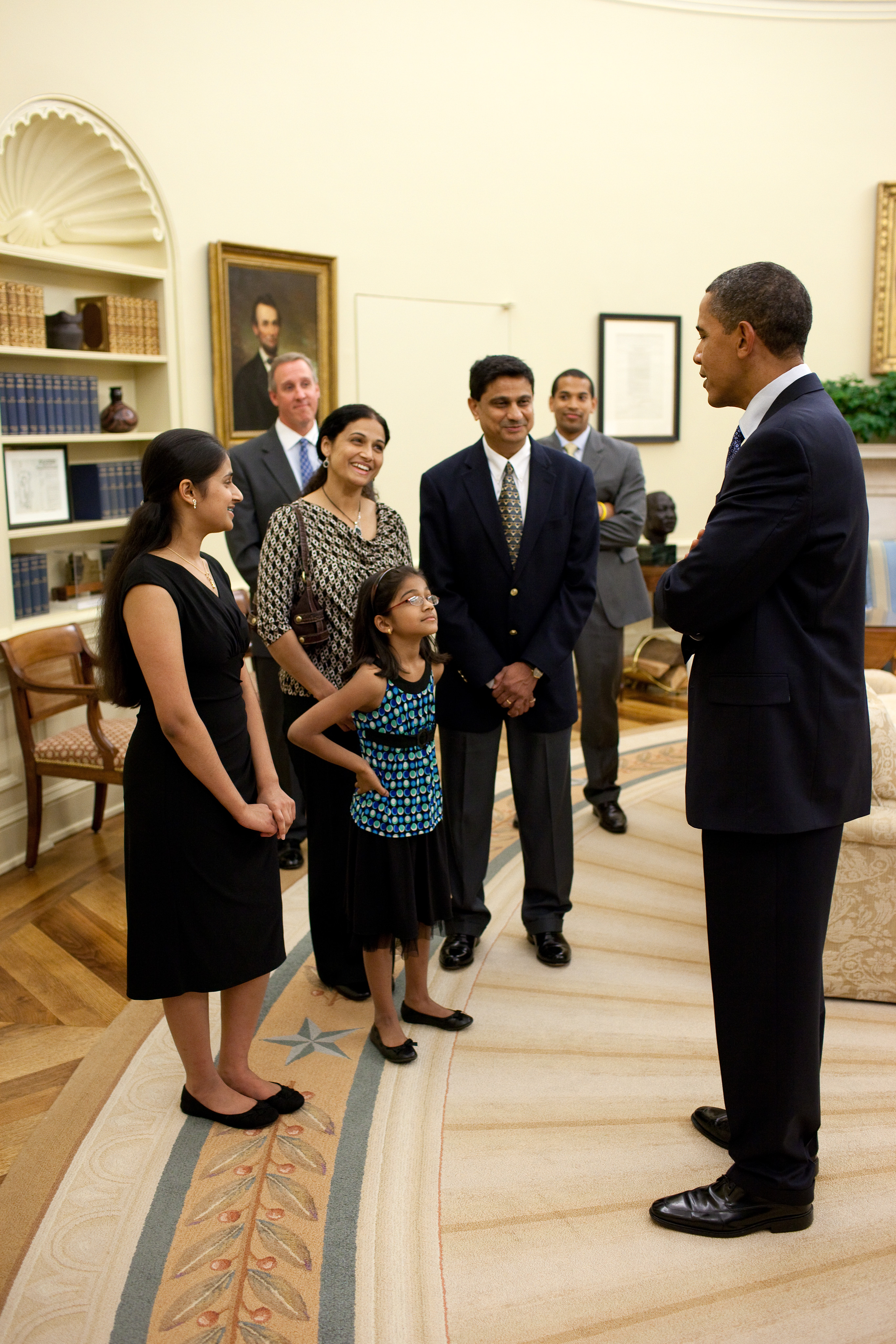
Kavya Shivashankar, the 2009 winner, meeting President Barack Obama. Also pictured is her younger sister Vanya Shivashankar, who would go on to be co-champion in 2015.

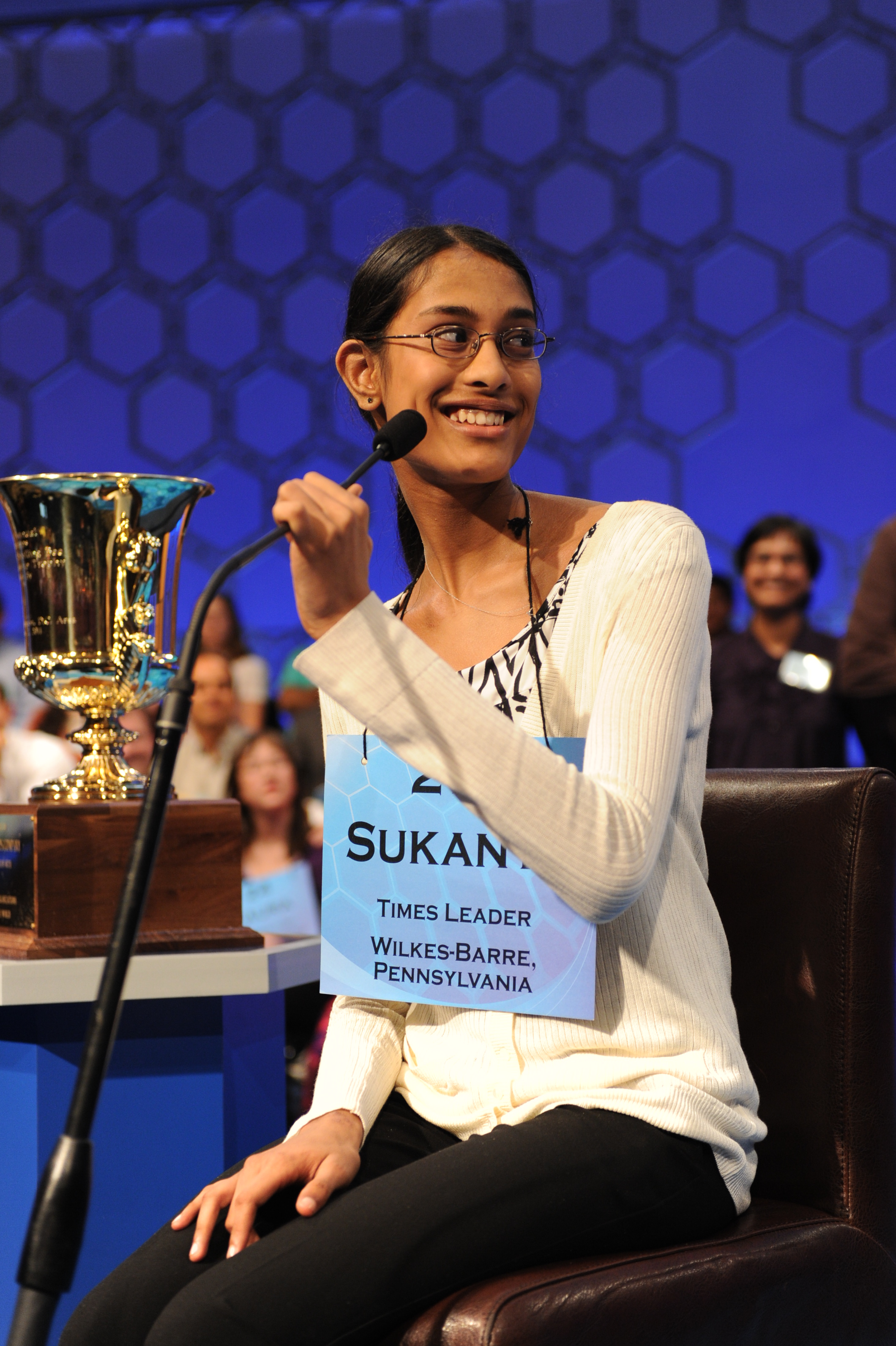
Sukanya Roy, the winner of the 2011 competition

†	Joint champions

Edition	Year	Competition-ending word	Winner	Sponsor	Sponsor's location
1st	1925	gladiolus	Frank Neuhauser	The Courier-Journal	Louisville, Kentucky
2nd	1926	cerise	Pauline Bell	The Courier-Journal	Louisville, Kentucky
3rd	1927	abrogate	Dean Lucas	Akron Beacon Journal	Akron, Ohio
4th	1928	knack	Betty Robinson	South Bend News-Times	South Bend, Indiana
5th	1929	luxuriance	Virginia Hogan	Omaha World-Herald	Omaha, Nebraska
6th	1930	albumen	Helen Jensen	The Des Moines Register and Tribune	Des Moines, Iowa
7th	1931	foulard	Ward Randall	White Hall Register-Republican	White Hall, Illinois
8th	1932	invulnerable	Dorothy Greenwald	The Des Moines Register and Tribune	Des Moines, Iowa
9th	1933	torsion	Alma Roach	Akron Beacon Journal	Akron, Ohio
10th	1934	brethren	Sarah Wilson	Portland Evening Express	Portland, Maine
11th	1935	intelligible	Clara Mohler	Akron Beacon Journal	Akron, Ohio
12th	1936	eczema	Jean Trowbridge	The Des Moines Register and Tribune	Des Moines, Iowa
13th	1937	promiscuous	Waneeta Rose Beckley	The Courier-Journal	Louisville, Kentucky
14th	1938	sanitarium	Marian Richardson	The Louisville Times	Louisville, Kentucky
15th	1939	canonical	Elizabeth Ann Rice	Telegram & Gazette	Worcester, Massachusetts
16th	1940	therapy	Laurel Kuykendall	The Knoxville News-Sentinel	Knoxville, Tennessee
17th	1941	initials	Louis Edward Sissman	The Detroit News	Detroit, Michigan
18th	1942	sacrilegious	Richard Earnhart	El Paso Herald-Post	El Paso, Texas
19th	1946	semaphore	John McKinney	The Des Moines Register and Tribune	Des Moines, Iowa
20th	1947	chlorophyll	Mattie Lou Pollard	Atlanta Journal	Atlanta, Georgia
21st	1948	psychiatry	Jean Chappelear	Akron Beacon Journal	Akron, Ohio
22nd	1949	onerous	Kim Calvin	Canton Repository	Canton, Ohio
23rd	1950	meticulosity	Diana Reynard†	Cleveland Press	Cleveland, Ohio
23rd	1950	meticulosity	Colquitt Dean†	Atlanta Journal	Atlanta, Georgia
24th	1951	insouciant	Irving Belz	Memphis Press Scimitar	Memphis, Tennessee
25th	1952	vignette	Doris Ann Hall	Winston-Salem Journal	Winston-Salem, North Carolina
26th	1953	soubrette	Elizabeth Hess	Arizona Republic	Phoenix, Arizona
27th	1954	transept	William Cashore	Norristown Times Herald	Norristown, Pennsylvania
28th	1955	crustaceology	Sandra Sloss	St. Louis Globe-Democrat	St. Louis, Missouri
29th	1956	condominium	Melody Sachko	Pittsburgh Press	Pittsburgh, Pennsylvania
30th	1957	schappe	Dana Bennett†	Rocky Mountain News	Denver, Colorado
30th	1957	schappe	Sandra Owen†	Canton Repository	Canton, Ohio
31st	1958	syllepsis	Jolitta Schlehuber	Topeka Daily Capital	Topeka, Kansas
32nd	1959	catamaran	Joel Montgomery	Rocky Mountain News	Denver, Colorado
33rd	1960	eudaemonic	Henry Feldman	The Knoxville News-Sentinel	Knoxville, Tennessee
34th	1961	smaragdine	John Capehart	Tulsa Tribune	Tulsa, Oklahoma
35th	1962	esquamulose	Nettie Crawford†	El Paso Herald-Post	El Paso, Texas
35th	1962	esquamulose	Michael Day†	St. Louis Globe-Democrat	St. Louis, Missouri
36th	1963	equipage	Glen Van Slyke III	The Knoxville News-Sentinel	Knoxville, Tennessee
37th	1964	sycophant	William Kerek	Akron Beacon Journal	Akron, Ohio
38th	1965	eczema	Michael Kerpan Jr.	Tulsa Tribune	Tulsa, Oklahoma
39th	1966	ratoon	Robert A. Wake	Houston Chronicle	Houston, Texas
40th	1967	chihuahua	Jennifer Reinke	The Omaha World-Herald	Omaha, Nebraska
41st	1968	abalone	Robert L. Walters	The Topeka Daily Capital	Topeka, Kansas
42nd	1969	interlocutory	Susan Yoachum	Dallas Morning News	Dallas, Texas
43rd	1970	croissant	Libby Childress	Winston-Salem Journal & Sentinel	Winston-Salem, North Carolina
44th	1971	shalloon	Jonathan Knisely	Philadelphia Bulletin	Philadelphia, Pennsylvania
45th	1972	macerate	Robin Kral	Lubbock Avalanche-Journal	Lubbock, Texas
46th	1973	vouchsafe	Barrie Trinkle	Fort Worth Press	Fort Worth, Texas
47th	1974	hydrophyte	Julie Ann Junkin	Birmingham Post-Herald	Birmingham, Alabama
48th	1975	incisor	Hugh Tosteson García	San Juan Star	San Juan, Puerto Rico
49th	1976	narcolepsy	Tim Kneale	Syracuse Herald-Journal	Syracuse, New York
50th	1977	cambist	John Paola	The Pittsburgh Press	Pittsburgh, Pennsylvania
51st	1978	deification	Peg McCarthy	The Topeka Capital-Journal	Topeka, Kansas
52nd	1979	maculature	Katie Kerwin	Rocky Mountain News	Denver, Colorado
53rd	1980	elucubrate	Jacques Bailly	Rocky Mountain News	Denver, Colorado
54th	1981	sarcophagus	Paige Pipkin	El Paso Herald-Post	El Paso, Texas
55th	1982	psoriasis	Molly Dieveney	Rocky Mountain News	Denver, Colorado
56th	1983	Purim	Blake Giddens	El Paso Herald-Post	El Paso, Texas
57th	1984	luge	Daniel Greenblatt	Loudoun Times-Mirror	Leesburg, Virginia
58th	1985	milieu	Balu Natarajan	Chicago Tribune	Chicago, Illinois
59th	1986	odontalgia	Jon Pennington	The Patriot News	Harrisburg, Pennsylvania
60th	1987	staphylococci	Stephanie Petit	The Pittsburgh Press	Pittsburgh, Pennsylvania
61st	1988	elegiacal	Rageshree Ramachandran	The Sacramento Bee	Sacramento, California
62nd	1989	spoliator	Scott Isaacs	Rocky Mountain News	Denver, Colorado
63rd	1990	fibranne	Amy Marie Dimak	The Seattle Times	Seattle, Washington
64th	1991	antipyretic	Joanne Marie Lagatta	Wisconsin State Journal	Clintonville, Wisconsin
65th	1992	lyceum	Amanda Goad	The Richmond News Leader	Richmond, Virginia
66th	1993	kamikaze	Geoff Hooper	The Commercial Appeal	Memphis, Tennessee
67th	1994	antediluvian	Ned G. Andrews	The Knoxville News-Sentinel	Knoxville, Tennessee
68th	1995	xanthosis	Justin Tyler Carroll	The Commercial Appeal	Memphis, Tennessee
69th	1996	vivisepulture	Wendy Guey	The Palm Beach Post	West Palm Beach, Florida
70th	1997	euonym	Rebecca Sealfon	New York Daily News	New York City
71st	1998	chiaroscurist	Jody-Anne Maxwell	Phillips & Phillips Stationery Suppliers	Kingston, Jamaica
72nd	1999	logorrhea	Nupur Lala	The Tampa Tribune	Tampa, Florida
73rd	2000	demarche	George Thampy	St. Louis Post-Dispatch	St. Louis, Missouri
74th	2001	succedaneum	Sean Conley	Aitkin Independent Age	Aitken, Minnesota
75th	2002	prospicience	Pratyush Buddiga	Rocky Mountain News	Denver, Colorado
76th	2003	pococurante	Sai Gunturi	Dallas Morning News	Dallas, Texas
77th	2004	autochthonous	David Tidmarsh	South Bend Tribune	South Bend, Indiana
78th	2005	appoggiatura	Anurag Kashyap	San Diego Union-Tribune	San Diego, California
79th	2006	Ursprache	Kerry Close	Asbury Park Press/Home News Tribune	Spring Lake, New Jersey
80th	2007	serrefine	Evan O'Dorney	Contra Costa Times	Walnut Creek, California
81st	2008	guerdon	Sameer Mishra	Journal & Courier	West Lafayette, Indiana
82nd	2009	Laodicean	Kavya Shivashankar	The Olathe News	Olathe, Kansas
83rd	2010	stromuhr	Anamika Veeramani	The Plain Dealer	Cleveland, Ohio
84th	2011	cymotrichous	Sukanya Roy	Times Leader	Wilkes-Barre, Pennsylvania
85th	2012	guetapens	Snigdha Nandipati	U-T San Diego	San Diego, California
86th	2013	knaidel	Arvind Mahankali	New York Daily News	New York City
87th	2014	stichomythia	Sriram J. Hathwar†	Corning Rotary Club	Corning, New York
87th	2014	feuilleton	Ansun Sujoe†	Texas Christian University	Fort Worth, Texas
88th	2015	scherenschnitte	Vanya Shivashankar†	The Olathe News	Olathe, Kansas
88th	2015	nunatak	Gokul Venkatachalam†	St. Louis Post-Dispatch	St. Louis, Missouri
89th	2016	Feldenkrais	Jairam Hathwar†	Corning Rotary Club	Corning, New York
89th	2016	gesellschaft	Nihar Saireddy Janga†	Houston Public Media	Austin, Texas
90th	2017	marocain	Ananya Vinay	The Fresno Bee	Fresno, California
91st	2018	koinonia	Karthik Nemmani	Scoggins Middle School	McKinney, Texas
92nd	2019	auslaut	Rishik Gandhasri†	Bay Area Regional Spelling Bee	San Jose, California
92nd	2019	erysipelas	Erin Howard†	Adventure Travel	Huntsville, Alabama
92nd	2019	bougainvillea	Saketh Sundar†	Howard County Library	Clarksville, Maryland
92nd	2019	aiguillette	Shruthika Padhy†	Rosa International Middle School	Cherry Hill, New Jersey
92nd	2019	pendeloque	Sohum Sukhatankar†	Dallas Sports Commission	Dallas, Texas
92nd	2019	palama	Abhijay Kodali†	Dallas Sports Commission	Flower Mound, Texas
92nd	2019	cernuous	Christopher Serrao†	Discover Lehigh Valley	Whitehouse Station, New Jersey
92nd	2019	odylic	Rohan Raja†	Dallas Sports Commission	Irving, Texas
93rd	2021	murraya	Zaila Avant-garde	New Orleans Chapter of the Links	New Orleans, Louisiana
94th	2022	moorhen (Note: Word spelled during the 90-second spell-off tiebreaker.)	Harini Logan	The Brauntex Performing Arts Theatre Association	San Antonio, Texas
95th	2023	psammophile	Dev Shah	SNSB Region One Bee	Largo, Florida
96th	2024	abseil	Bruhat Soma	Rays Baseball Foundation and Rowdies Soccer Fund	St. Petersburg, Florida
97th	2025	éclaircissement	Faizan Zaki	Dallas Sports Commission	Allen, Texas
98th	2026	bromocriptine	Shrey Parikh	San Bernardino County Superintendent of Schools	Rancho Cucamonga, California
