= 56th Scripps National Spelling Bee =

Spelling bee held in the United States in 1983

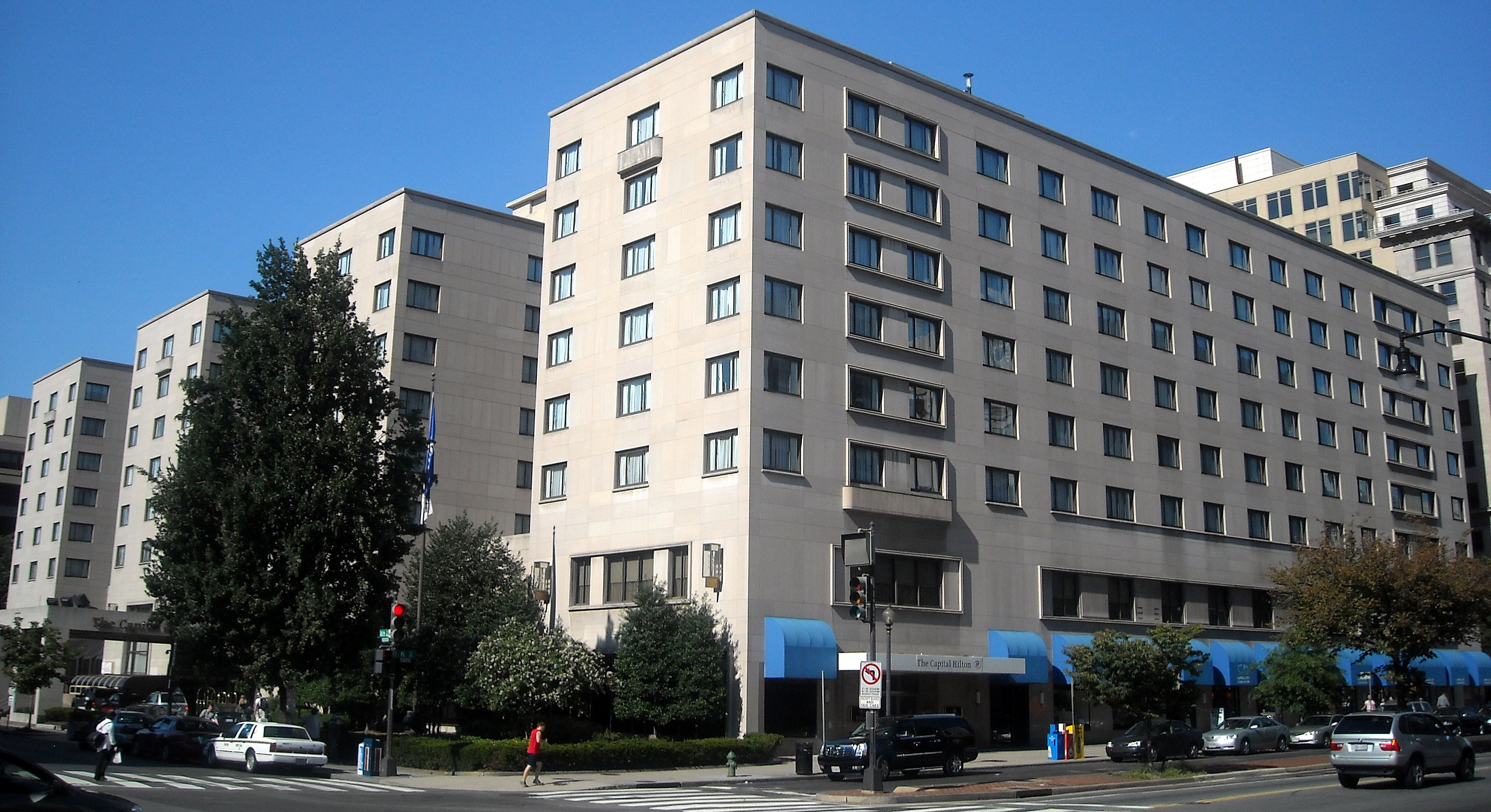
- The Capital Hilton, site of the 56th National Spelling Bee
- Date: June 8–9, 1983
- Location: The Capital Hilton in Washington, D.C.
- Winner: Blake Giddens (14 at time of win)
- Sponsor: El Paso Herald-Post
- Sponsor location: El Paso, Texas
- Winning word: Purim
- No. of contestants: 137
- Pronouncer: Alex Cameron

The 56th Scripps National Spelling Bee was held in Washington, D.C. at the Capital Hilton on June 8–9, 1983, sponsored by the E.W. Scripps Company.

The winner was 14-year-old Blake Giddens of Alamogordo, New Mexico, correctly guessing the proper spelling of "Purim". Giddens' sister Nicole had been a contestant in the 1980 and 1981 bees, where she finished 103rd and 43rd, respectively.

Second place was captured by 13-year-old Eric Rauchway of St. Petersburg, Florida, who missed "ratatouille" by putting an "i" at the end. Third-place went to 11-year-old Tanya Solomon of Kansas City, Missouri who missed "Vichyite". She was among 17 return competitors this year, and had finished 27th the prior year.

Giddens was crowned the winner at 11 a.m. on June 9, in round 11.

There were 137 spellers this year, 83 girls and 54 boys. Ten spellers went out in the first round on day one, and 17 in the second round. After lunch on day one, 16 spellers dropped out in the third round, and 42 in the fourth round, leaving 52 spellers at 5:10pm to make it to day two. A total of 574 words were used.

The first-place winner won $1,000. Alex Cameron was the pronouncer.
