= 77th Scripps National Spelling Bee =

Spelling bee held in the United States in 2004

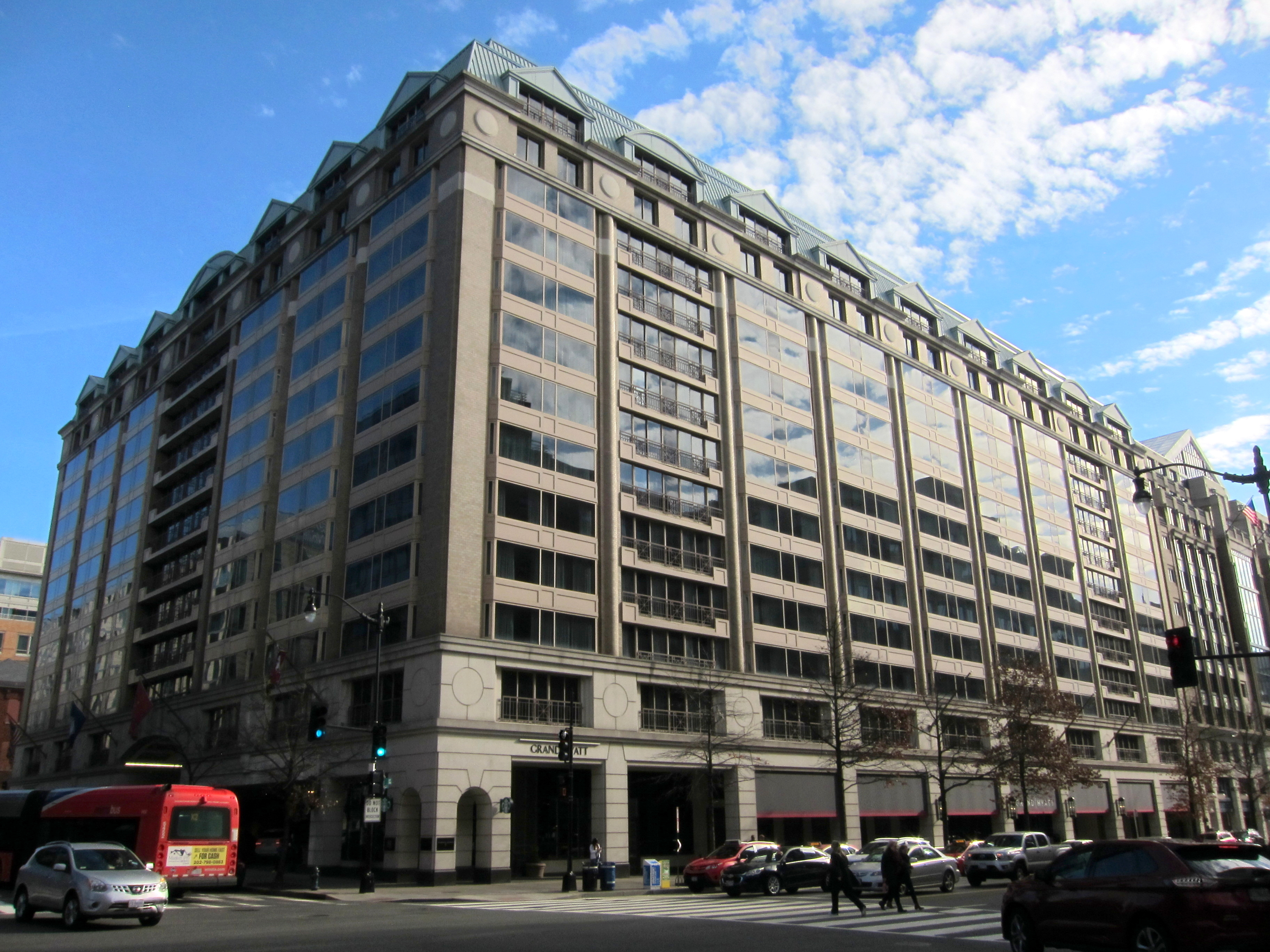
- The Grand Hyatt Washington in Washington, D.C., hosted the Scripps National Spelling Bee.
- Date: June 1–3, 2004
- Location: Grand Hyatt Washington, Washington D.C.
- Winner: David Tidmarsh (14 at time of win)
- Sponsor: South Bend Tribune
- Sponsor location: South Bend, Indiana
- Winning word: autochthonous
- No. of contestants: 265
- Pronouncer: Jacques Bailly

The 77th Scripps National Spelling Bee was held on June 1–3, 2004 in Washington D.C.

265 contestants between age 9 and 15 took part in the three-day competition, which lasted 15 rounds. Contestants were given a 25 word written test on the first day, and 191 of the 265 contestants got their first word correct in the oral competition which began on day two. The combination of those first two steps (with one point for each correct written word, and three for the oral word, for a maximum possible score of 28 and a minimum of 18 needed to advance) reduced the initial field to 94. By the end of day two, 46 contestants remained.

David Tidmarsh, a 14-year-old eighth-grader from South Bend, Indiana, and sponsored by the South Bend Tribune, took first after spelling autochthonous. Tidmarsh’s prize package included $12,000 and engraved cup, plus additional prizes from sponsors including an additional $5,000. Tidmarsh had come in 16th in the prior year's competition.

Akshay Buddiga, a 13-year-old boy from Colorado Springs, Colorado, took second. At one point Buddiga briefly fainted while attempting to spell "alopecoid", but stood up and spelled the word correctly. Akshay’s brother, Pratyush, won the 2002 Scripps National Spelling Bee.

Spellers faced a two-minute two limit per word, followed by a 30-second countdown clock, with the one-time ability to request one minute of bonus time.

== See also ==
- List of Scripps National Spelling Bee champions
