= 83rd Scripps National Spelling Bee =

Spelling bee held in the United States in 2010

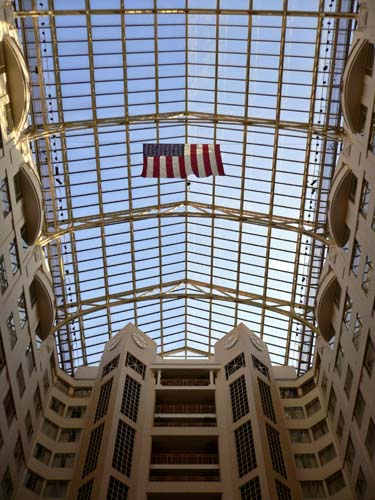
- Grand Hyatt Washington
- Date: June 2–4, 2010
- Location: Grand Hyatt Washington, Washington, D.C.
- Winner: Anamika Veeramani (13 at time of win)
- Sponsor: The Plain Dealer
- Winning word: stromuhr
- No. of contestants: 273
- Pronouncer: Jacques Bailly

The 83rd Scripps National Spelling Bee was an event held from June 2, 2010, to June 4, 2010, at the Grand Hyatt Washington in Washington D.C. The winner was Anamika Veeramani of Cleveland, Ohio.

== Competition details ==
- 273 spellers participated in the 2010 competition, including the greatest number of U.S.-based spellers in the history of the event. There was also a special guest, the Liberian spelling bee winner, who would have been #94 if she had been a competitor.
- The number of participants was down from the previous year, which had 293. The Canadian contingent, which usually has 21 spellers only sent the winner of the Canspell National Spelling Bee to represent Canada this year.
- The 2010 competition was the shortest National Spelling Bee on record, consisting of only nine rounds. More meaningfully, it featured the fewest rounds of any competition since the introduction in 2002 of a written test designed to shorten the competition by eliminating as many spellers as would several early rounds.
- This year's competition was the first visit for 110 spellers.
- The 2010 competition's youngest participant, at 8 years old, was Vanya Shivashankar, sister of 2009 winner Kavya Shivashankar.
- The spellers ranged in age from 8 to 15 years old, with 80% being between 12 and 14 years old (inclusive).
- Tim Ruiter, who placed 2nd in the 2009 bee and was a favorite to win, was eliminated in round four after misspelling fustanella.
- Neetu Chandak, who placed 8th in 2009 and was making her fourth appearance at the National Spelling Bee, misspelled paravane in round 5 but was reinstated because she received an ambiguous answer to a question about the word's etymology. In the next round, however, she was eliminated after misspelling apogalacteum.
- This was the final year the competition was held at the Grand Hyatt Washington before moving to the Gaylord National Resort & Convention Center in National Harbor, Maryland in 2011.

== Top finishers ==
- Anamika Veeramani, from Cleveland, Ohio, a student at Incarnate Word Academy, Parma Hts, Ohio. Veeramani won with the word stromuhr.
- This was the third year in a row that an Indian-American has won the championship. Eight Indian-Americans have won in the last 12 years.
- Adrian Gunawan of Illinois, Elizabeth Platz of Missouri, and Shantanu Srivatsa of North Dakota all tied for second place. This was the first three-way tie for second place in the event's history.
- 5th Place (tie): Laura Newcombe of Canada, Lanson Tang of Maryland, Joanna Ye of Pennsylvania, and Andrew Grose of Wisconsin.

== Word list championship round ==
- confiserie
- netsuke
- leishmanic
- gnocchi
- infundibuliform
- epiphysis
- tailleur
- aguinaldo
- terribilita
- rhytidome
- ochidore
- juvia
- stromuhr

== Broadcast information ==
- ABC aired the championship round in primetime from 8 to 9:37 p.m. Eastern time on June 4. Even though ESPN branding was not used, ESPN style presentation was used.
- The event was shown live in the Eastern and Central time zones and on tape delay in the Mountain and Pacific zones, as well as in Alaska and Hawaii.
- Chris Harrison, Erin Andrews and Paul Loeffler hosted the Championship Finals.
- Earlier rounds were carried online at ESPN3.com on June 3 at 1:15 p.m. ET/10:15 a.m. PT, and on ESPN on June 4 at 10 a.m. ET/7 a.m. PT.

== See also ==
- List of Scripps National Spelling Bee champions
