= 61st Scripps National Spelling Bee =

Spelling bee held in the United States in 1988

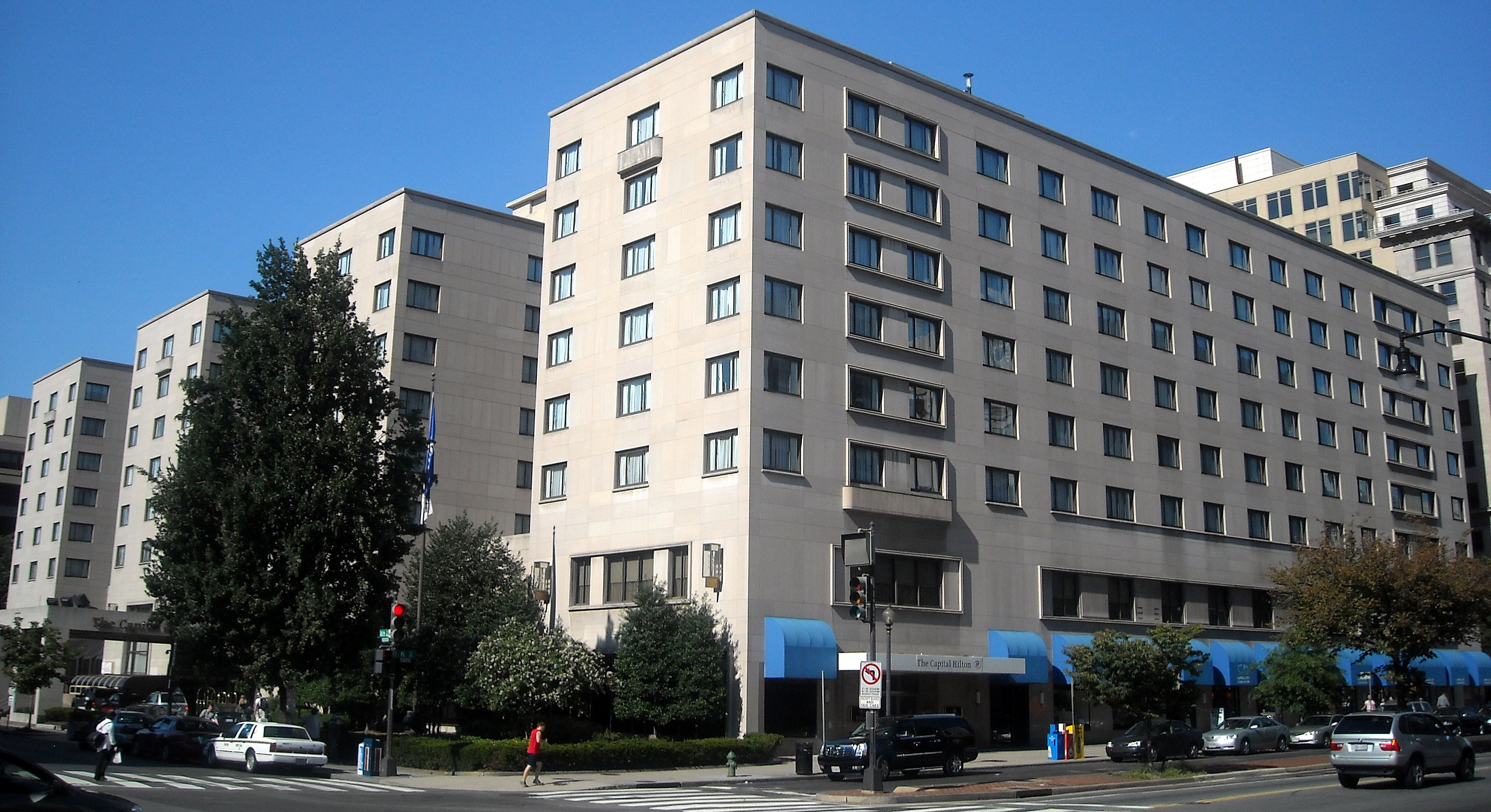
- The Capital Hilton, site of the 61st National Spelling Bee
- Date: June 1–2, 1988
- Location: The Capital Hilton in Washington, D.C.
- Winner: Rageshree Ramachandran (13 at time of win)
- Sponsor: The Sacramento Bee
- Sponsor location: Sacramento, California
- Winning word: elegiacal
- No. of contestants: 200
- Pronouncer: Alex Cameron

The 61st Scripps National Spelling Bee was held in Washington, D.C. at the Capital Hilton on June 1–2, 1988, sponsored by the E.W. Scripps Company.

The winner was 13-year–old Rageshree Ramachandran of Carmichael, California, correctly spelling "elegiacal" for the win. She had previously placed 36th in the 1986 bee. She was the second Indian-American to win the Bee (the first was at the 1985 bee). Fourteen-year-old Victor Wang of Camarillo, California placed second after a final showdown with Ramachandran that almost lasted for an hour, finally missing "stertorous". Twelve-year-old Robin Covey of Harper Woods, Michigan placed third, after previously successfully protesting a 15th place removal.

There were 200 spellers this year (102 girls and 98 boys), a new record. Eight-year old Iris Lui of Muncie, Indiana, who lasted until the fifth round, was reported to be the youngest speller ever to make the national bee. 144 spellers made it to day two of the competition. A total of 935 words were used.

The first place prize was $1,500; second was $1,000, third was $750, fourth $500, fifth $400, sixth $300, $200 for 7th-10th, $100 for 11th-20th, and $50 to each remaining speller.
