= 55th Scripps National Spelling Bee =

Spelling bee held in the United States in 1982

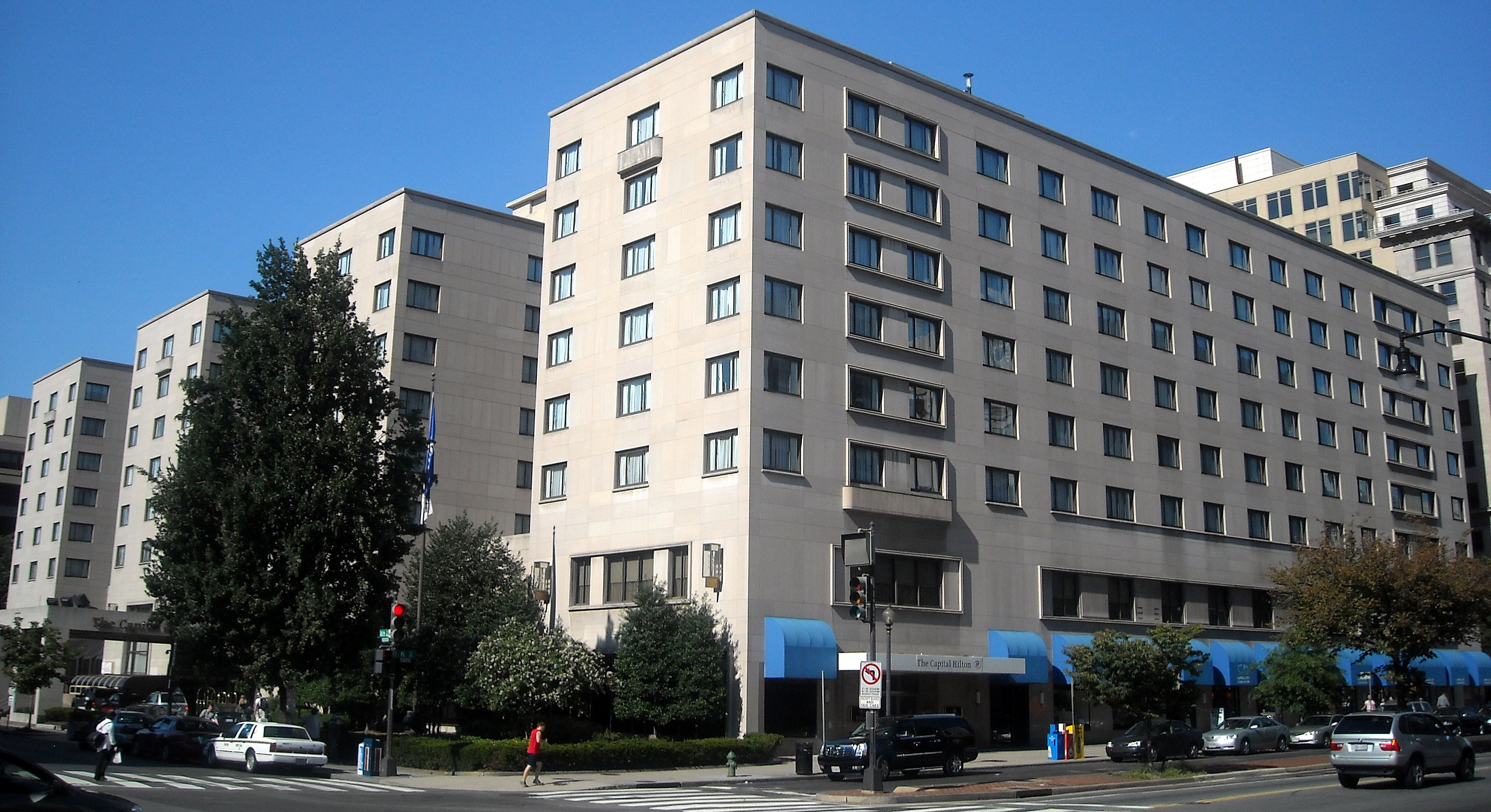
- The Capital Hilton, site of the 55th National Spelling Bee
- Date: June 2–3, 1982
- Location: The Capital Hilton in Washington, D.C.
- Winner: Molly Dieveney (12 at time of win)
- Sponsor: Rocky Mountain News
- Sponsor location: Denver, Colorado
- Winning word: psoriasis
- No. of contestants: 126
- Pronouncer: Alex Cameron

The 55th Scripps National Spelling Bee was held in Washington, D.C. at the Capital Hilton on June 2–3, 1982, sponsored by the E.W. Scripps Company.

The competition was won by 12-year-old Molly Dieveney from Denver, Colorado, correctly spelling "psoriasis" for the win. Dieveney was coached by the mother of Jacques Bailly (her next door neighbor), who won the bee two years prior. Second place went to 13-year-old Uma Rao of Pittsburgh, Pennsylvania, who misspelled "contretemps". Jason Johnson, 13, of St. Joseph, Michigan, and who placed second the prior year, placed third after missing "gauleiter".

There were 126 spellers this year, 81 girls and 45 boys, with 54 making it to the second day of competition. Nine spellers left in the first round, 22 in the second, 8 in the third, and 33 in the fourth. Alex Cameron was the pronouncer. A total of 546 words were used.

The first place cash prize was $1,000, with $500 for second, and $250 for third. The next five finishers got $100, the next ten $75, and the remaining received $50.
