= 57th Scripps National Spelling Bee =

Spelling bee held in the United States in 1984

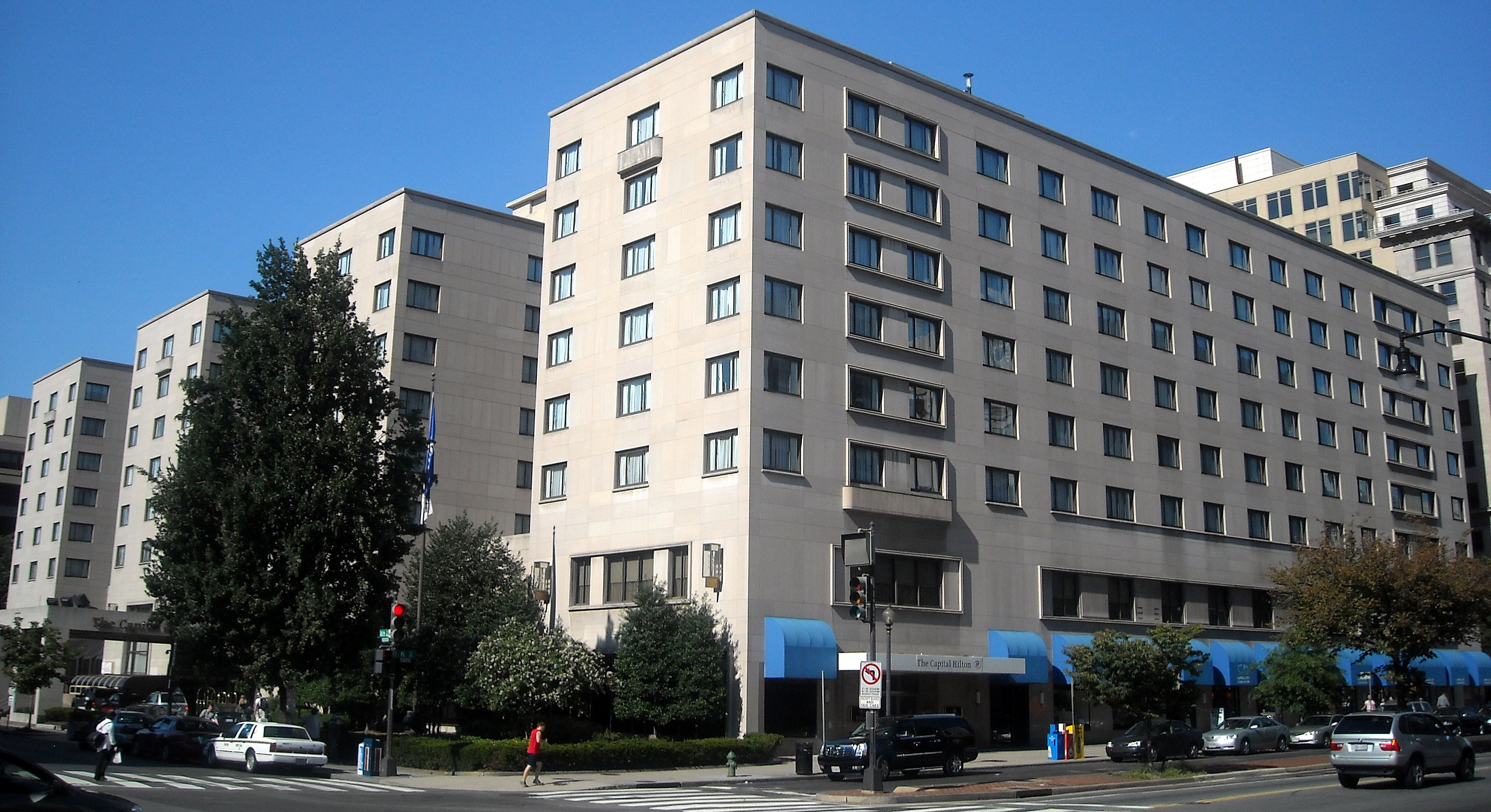
- The Capital Hilton, site of the 57th National Spelling Bee
- Date: May 30–31, 1984
- Location: The Capital Hilton in Washington, D.C.
- Winner: Daniel Greenblatt (13 at time of win)
- Sponsor: Loudoun Times-Mirror
- Sponsor location: Leesburg, Virginia
- Winning word: luge
- No. of contestants: 151
- Pronouncer: Alex Cameron

The 57th Scripps National Spelling Bee was held in Washington, D.C. at the Capital Hilton on May 30–31, 1984, sponsored by the E.W. Scripps Company.

The winner was 13-year-old Daniel Greenblatt of Sterling, Virginia, who correctly spelled "luge" for the win. Greenblatt was the first winner ever sponsored by a weekly newspaper, the Loudon Times-Mirror of Leesburg, Virginia. Second place went to 13-year-old Amy McWhirter of St. Joseph, Michigan, who missed "towhee".

There were 151 contestants this year (up from 137 the prior year), 78 girls and 73 boys. Fourth- to eighth-place spellers made it to the second day of competition. A total of 606 words were used.

The first-place winner received $1000. Alex Cameron was the pronouncer, in his fourth year in that role.
