= 62nd Scripps National Spelling Bee =

Spelling bee held in the United States in 1989

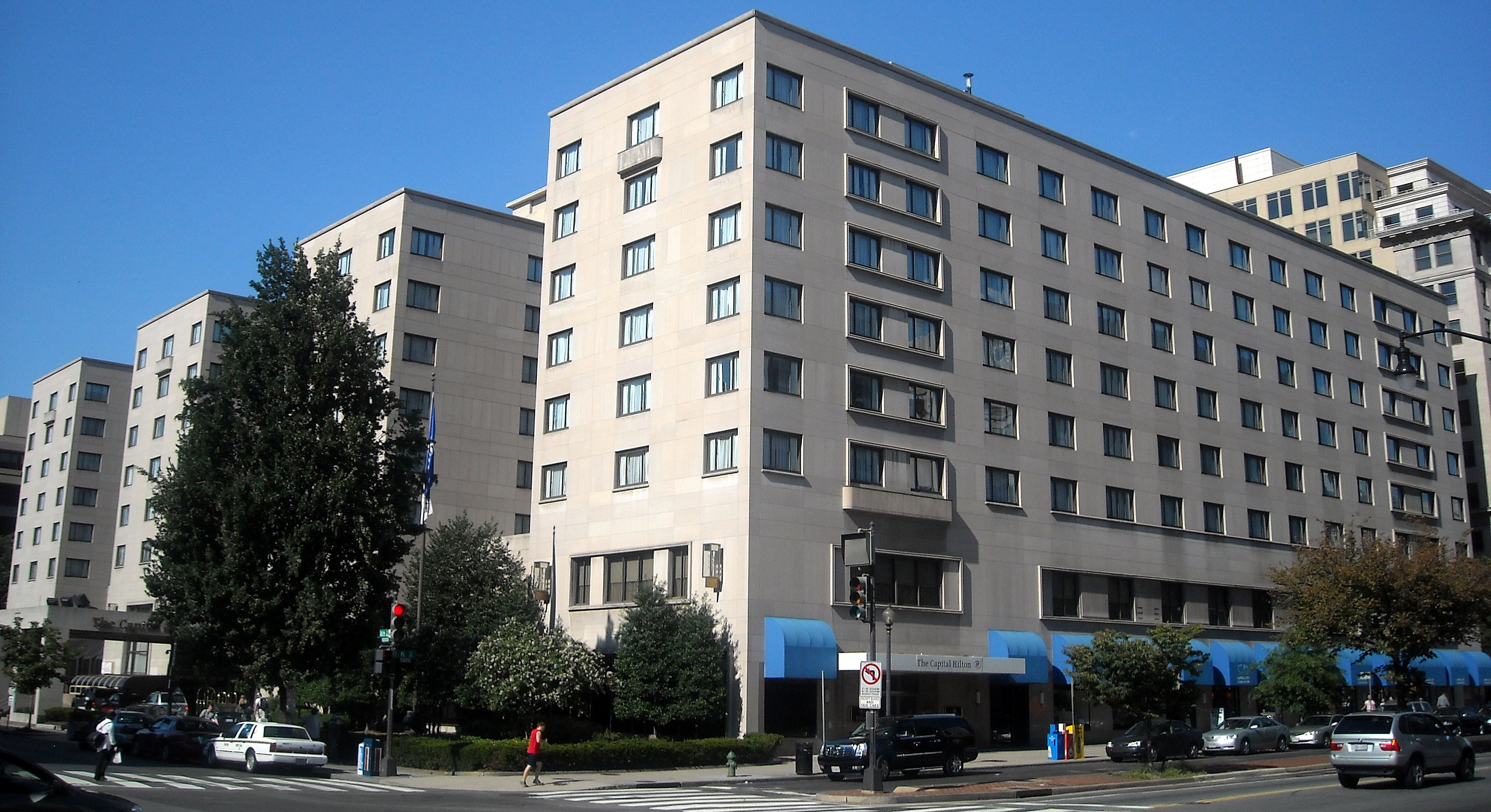
- The Capital Hilton, site of the 62nd National Spelling Bee
- Date: May 31 – June 1, 1989
- Location: The Capital Hilton in Washington, D.C.
- Winner: Scott Isaacs (14 at time of win)
- Sponsor: Rocky Mountain News
- Sponsor location: Denver, Colorado
- Winning word: spoliator
- No. of contestants: 222
- Pronouncer: Alex Cameron

The 62nd annual Scripps National Spelling Bee was held on May 31 – June 1, 1989. in Washington, D.C.

It was won by Scott Isaacs, a 14-year-old eighth grader, sponsored by the Rocky Mountain News of Denver, Colorado, with the word "spoliator". Runner up was Ojas V. Tejani of Hixson, Tennessee, third place went to Arthur A. Hodge of Pottsville, Pennsylvania, and fourth place went to Samantha Cassell of Johnson City, Tennessee.

There were 222 contestants this year, 120 girls and 102 boys, ranging from age 9 to 15 (one age 9, 6 age 10, 24 age 11, 45 age 12, 89 age 13, 55 age 14, and 2 age 15). Seven spellers appeared in their third bee. A total of 903 words were used this year. Contestants arrived in Washington, D.C. on Sunday May 28. They visited Gunston Hall on May 29 and Washington monuments and the National Aquarium in Baltimore on May 30.

The first place prize this year was $1,500, with $1,000 for second place, $750 for third, $500 for fourth, $300 for sixth, $200 for 7th-10th, $100 for 11th-20th, and $50 for each remaining speller.
