= 59th Scripps National Spelling Bee =

Spelling bee held in the United States in 1986

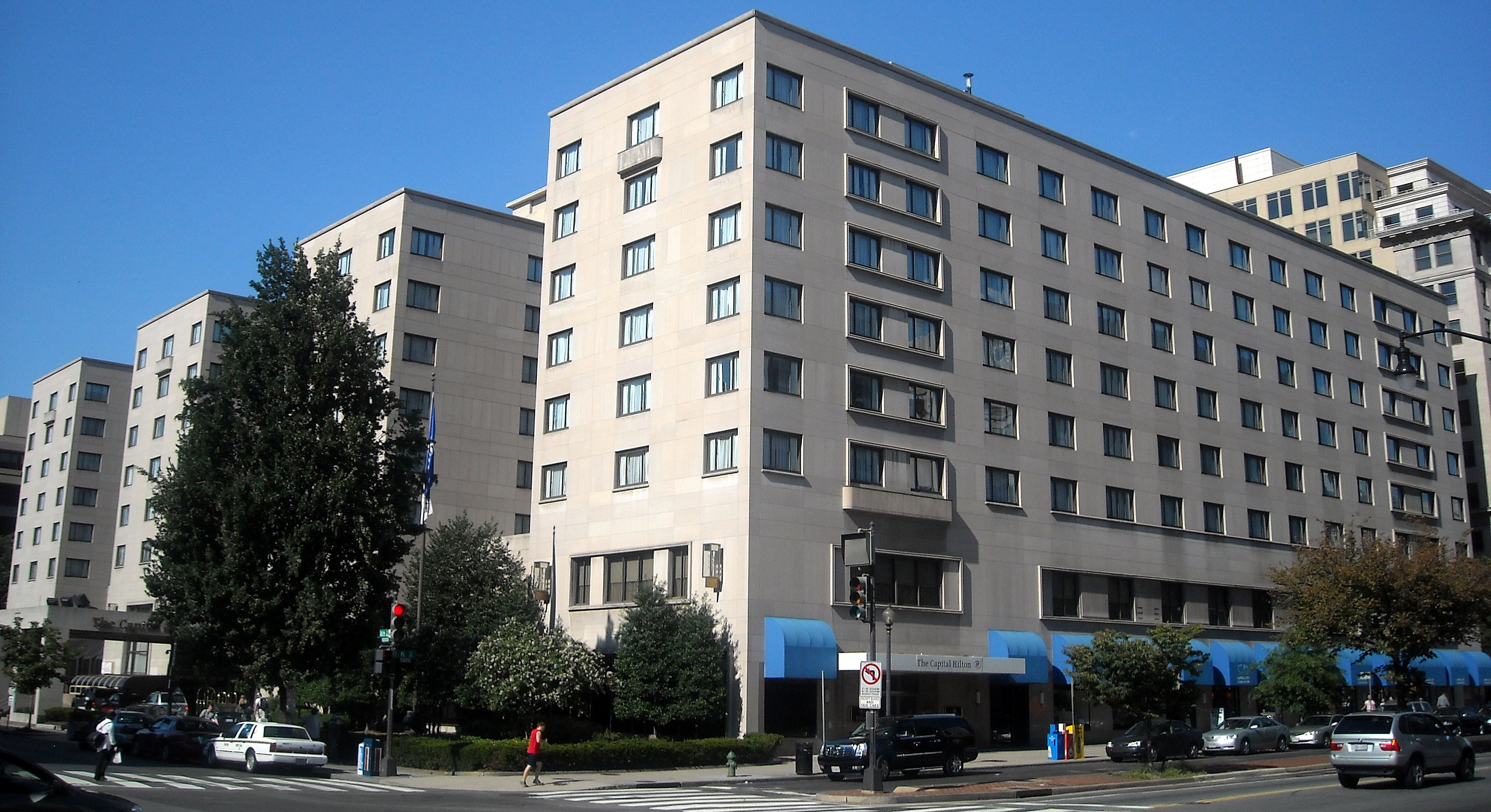
- The Capital Hilton, site of the 59th National Spelling Bee
- Date: May 28–29, 1986
- Location: The Capital Hilton in Washington, D.C.
- Winner: Jon Pennington (14 at time of win)
- Sponsor: The Patriot-News
- Sponsor location: Harrisburg, Pennsylvania
- Winning word: odontalgia
- No. of contestants: 174
- Pronouncer: Alex Cameron

The 59th Scripps National Spelling Bee was held in Washington, D.C. at the Capital Hilton on May 28–29, 1986, sponsored by the E.W. Scripps Company.

The winner was 14-year-old Jon Pennington of Shiremanstown, Pennsylvania, correctly spelling "odontalgia". Second place went to 13-year-old Kenneth Larson of Tequesta, Florida, who missed "kaolinic". Larson was competing for the third time, having finished 111th in 1985 and 65th in 1984.

There were 174 participants this year (100 girls and 74 boys, ages 9–14), and a total of 725 words used. Nine spellers missed in the first round, 36 in the second, and 14 in the third. 115 spellers made it to day two of the competition, and the final round between the last two spellers began at about 4:40pm. Alex Cameron was the pronouncer.

The first-place winner received $1000 (and other non-cash prizes). Second place got $500, and third received $250. Fourth through eighth places received $100, the next ten received $75, and the remaining 156 spellers received $50 each.
