= 76th Scripps National Spelling Bee =

Spelling bee held in the United States in 2003

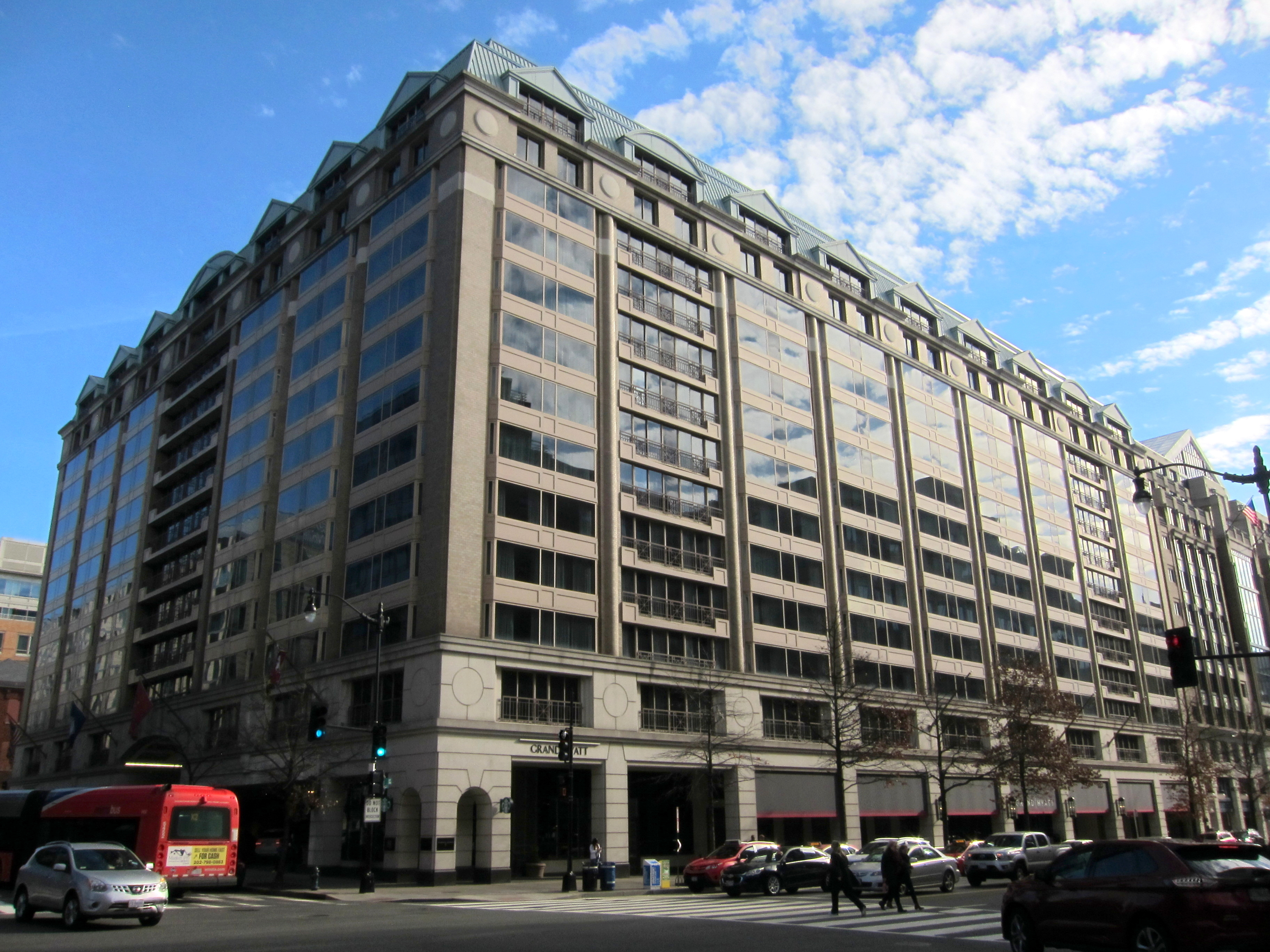
- The Grand Hyatt Washington in Washington, D.C., hosted the Scripps National Spelling Bee.
- Date: May 28–29, 2003
- Location: Grand Hyatt Washington, Washington D.C.
- Winner: Sai R. Gunturi (13 at time of win)
- Sponsor: The Dallas Morning News
- Sponsor location: Dallas, Texas
- Winning word: pococurante
- No. of contestants: 251
- Pronouncer: Jacques Bailly (first year as chief pronouncer)

The 76th Scripps National Spelling Bee was held May 28–29, 2003, in Washington D.C.

== Winners ==
The competition was won by 13-year-old eighth grader Sai R. Gunturi of Dallas, sponsored by the Dallas Morning News, who correctly spelled rhathymia followed by pococurante for the win. He had studied the final word previously, so knew he was going to win. He won $12,000 as well as additional prizes. It was Gunturi's fourth trip to the Bee, improving his performance every year. He tied for 32nd in 2000, and placed 16th in 2001 and 7th in 2002; his sister Nivedita tied for 8th place in 1997.

Second place went to 14-year-old homeschooled student Evelyn Blacklock of Tuxedo Park, New York, who misspelled gnathonic. She had also competed the prior year, finishing 59th.

Third place was a three-way tie among three contestants who fell in round 11. JJ Goldstein, age 13 of Great Neck, New York, fell when misspelling betony. Samir Patel, age 9, of Colleyville, Texas, misspelled boudin. Patel tied for second-place two years later in the 2005 Bee. And Trudy McLeary, age 14 of Kingston, Jamaica, fell on aplustre. This was the best performance by an entrant from Jamaica since winning the 1998 Bee.

== Competition ==
251 contestants participated between the ages of 9 and 15, with most being age 13 and in eighth grade. The field included 167 students attending public schools, and 19 with a sibling with prior Bee experience. The competition lasted 15 rounds, and started on May 28, 2003, with an oral round that excluded 76 contestants, followed by a 25-word written test which eliminated 91 more spellers. The next year the written test, first introduced the prior year, was given before the oral round because spellers had reported being too anxious to do a written test after the opening oral round. Eighty-four contestants returned for the final competition at 8 a.m. the next day. The competition by 2:15 p.m. was reduced to 30. The final rounds were aired on ESPN and ESPN2.

This was the first year in which Jacques Bailly became chief pronouncer, replacing the recently deceased Alex Cameron who had served in that role for over 20 years.
