= 13th Scripps National Spelling Bee =

Spelling bee held in the United States in 1937

13th National Spelling Bee
- Date: May 25, 1937
- Location: National Museum in Washington, D.C.
- Winner: Waneeta Beckley (14 at time of win)
- Sponsor: The Courier-Journal
- Sponsor location: Louisville, Kentucky
- Winning word: promiscuous
- No. of contestants: 16

The 13th National Spelling Bee was held in Washington, D.C. at the National Museum on May 25, 1937, and sponsored by the Louisville, Kentucky Courier-Journal. Scripps-Howard would not sponsor the Bee until 1941.

Sixteen spellers participated in the competition, held in the auditorium of the National Museum. The winner was 14-year-old Waneeta Beckley of Kentucky, correctly spelling the word promiscuous. Second place went to Betty Grunstra, age 12 of New Jersey, who misspelled plebeian. Third place went to 14-year-old Angelo Mangieri from Jersey City, New Jersey, the first blind person to reach the finals.

Beckley won $500, Grunstra took home $300, and Mangieri received $100.

== See also ==
- List of Scripps National Spelling Bee champions
