= 15th Scripps National Spelling Bee =

Spelling bee held in the United States in 1939

15th National Spelling Bee
- Date: May 29, 1939
- Location: National Museum in Washington, D.C.
- Winner: Elizabeth Ann Rice (12 at time of win)
- Sponsor: Worcester Telegram & Gazette
- Sponsor location: Worcester, Massachusetts
- Winning word: canonical
- No. of contestants: 21
- Pronouncer: Harold F. Harding and George F. Hussey, Jr.

The 15th National Spelling Bee was held in Washington, D.C., on May 29, 1939. Scripps-Howard would not sponsor the Bee until two years later.

The winner was 12-year-old Elizabeth Ann Rice of Auburn, Massachusetts and sponsored by the Worcester Telegram & Gazette, correctly spelling the word canonical. Humphrey Cook, age 13 of Virginia, took second after misspelling homogeneity. 14-year-old Mildred Kariher of Ohio took third after missing farcial [sic].

There were 21 contestants this year, all in the fifth through eight grades, with the westernmost entrant from Colorado.

A banquet was held the night before the Bee at the Ambassador Hotel. The winner of the first bee in 1925, Frank Neuhauser, now a law student, was in attendance.

The first place prize was $500, second was $300, and third was $100. Fourth through 16th place received $50, and 17th through 21st received $40. Winner Rice (married name Riza) later worked as an office manager and business manager until retiring in 1996. She took up running in her 50s and ran the Boston Marathon three times. She died in Worcester, Massachusetts on April 18, 2012.
