= 32nd Scripps National Spelling Bee =

Spelling bee held in the United States in 1959

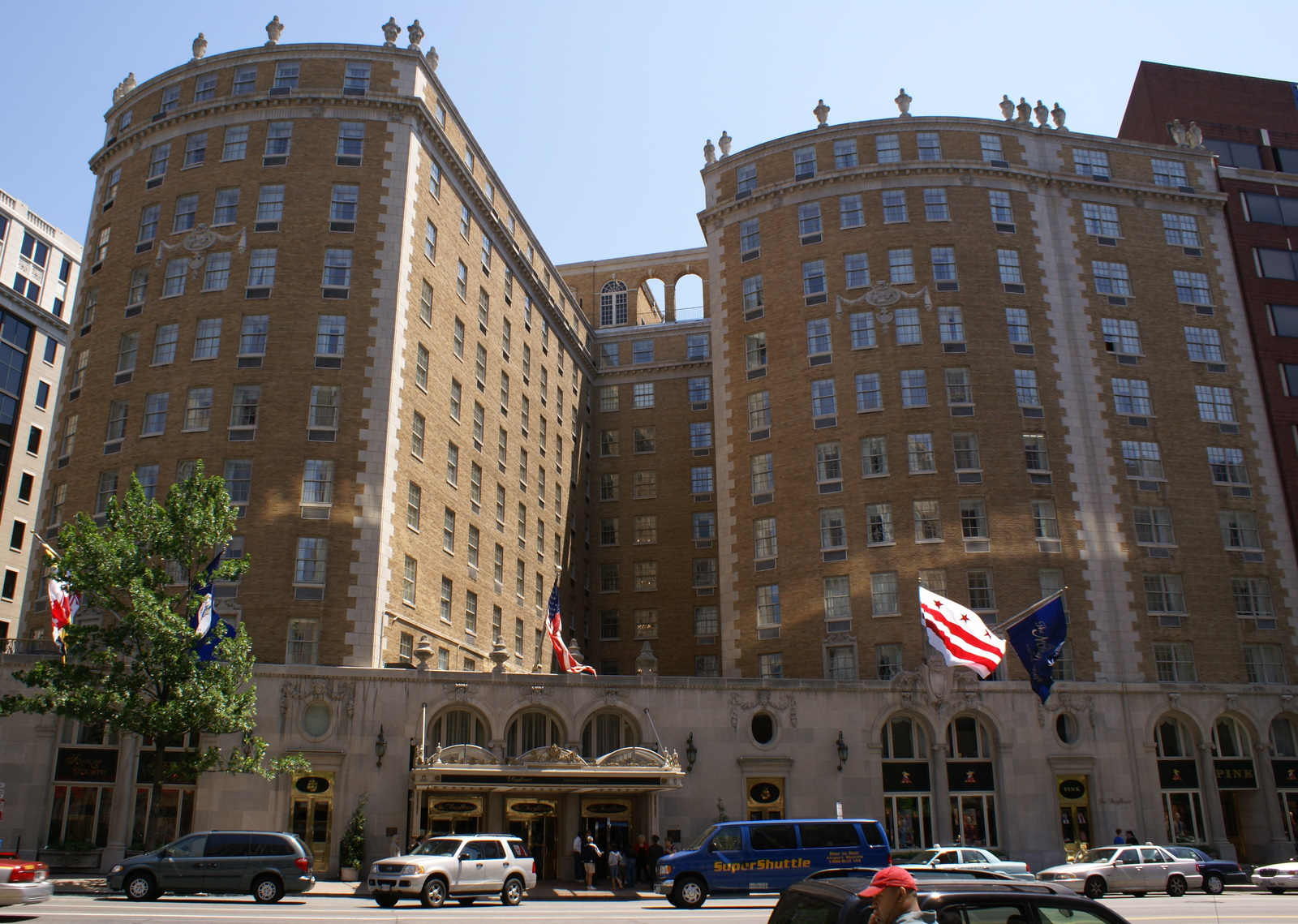
- The Mayflower Hotel, site of the 32nd National Spelling Bee
- Date: June 11–12, 1959
- Location: The Mayflower Hotel in Washington, D.C.
- Winner: Joel Montgomery (12 at time of win)
- Sponsor: Rocky Mountain News
- Sponsor location: Denver, Colorado
- Winning word: catamaran
- No. of contestants: 70
- Pronouncer: Benson S. Alleman

The 32nd Scripps National Spelling Bee was held at the Mayflower Hotel in Washington, District of Columbia on June 11–12, 1959, organized by the E.W. Scripps Company.

There were 70 entrants, with 59 eliminated on the first day, leaving 11 finalists for the second day of competition. Five of the eleven finalists had competed the prior year.

The winner was Joel Montgomery (age 12) of Denver, a seventh-grader at Byers Junior High, correctly spelling the word catamaran. He was the first boy to win since 1954. Second place went to Robert Crossley (age 13) of Center Square, Pennsylvania, who had finished 14th the prior year, and who failed to correctly spell fanfaronade. Allan Lee Kramer (age 13) of Lake Worth, Florida placed third.

Montgomery appeared on the Ed Sullivan Show on June 14, 1959.
