= 14th Scripps National Spelling Bee =

Spelling bee held in the United States in 1938

14th National Spelling Bee
- Date: May 31, 1938
- Location: National Museum in Washington, D.C.
- Winner: Marian Richardson (12 at time of win)
- Sponsor: The Louisville Times
- Sponsor location: Louisville, Kentucky
- Winning word: sanitarium
- No. of contestants: 22
- Pronouncer: Harold F. Harding and George F. Hussey

The 14th National Spelling Bee was held at the National Museum in Washington, D.C., on May 31, 1938. Scripps-Howard would not sponsor the Bee until 1941.

The winner was 12-year-old Marian Richardson, who attended a one-room schoolhouse in Floyd County, Indiana, correctly spelling the word sanitarium. Jean Pierce of Kenmore, New York placed second after failing to correctly spell pronunciation.

Winner Marian Richardson, later Byrnes, dedicated her life to advocacy. As a college student, she organized one of Indiana University's first NAACP chapters, later becoming a Chicago teacher, a mother of four, and a fierce environmental hero. In 1979, she successfully rallied her neighbors to block a transit facility from destroying the prairie behind her Chicago home. She spent decades leading environmental task forces, stopping a proposed airport, and shuttering a hazardous waste incinerator. She died on May 20, 2010.
