= 27th Scripps National Spelling Bee =

Spelling bee held in the United States in 1954

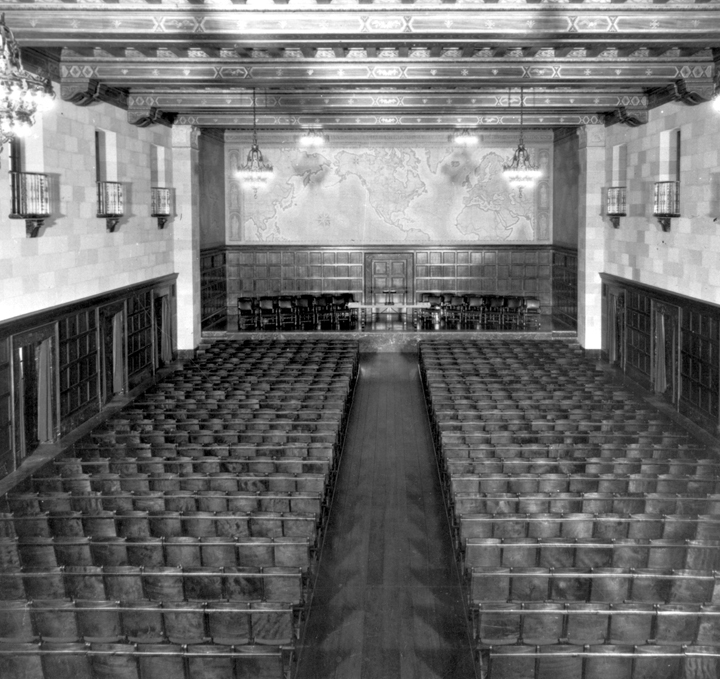
- Department of Commerce auditorium
- Date: May 20, 1954
- Location: Department of Commerce auditorium, Washington, D.C.
- Winner: William Cashore (14 at time of win)
- Sponsor: Norristown Times Herald
- Sponsor location: Norristown, Pennsylvania
- Winning word: transept
- No. of contestants: 57
- Pronouncer: Benson S. Alleman

The 27th Scripps National Spelling Bee was held in Washington, District of Columbia on May 20, 1954, sponsored by the E.W. Scripps Company.

The winner was William Cashore, 14, of Center Square, Pennsylvania, for correctly spelling the word transept. William Kelly, 11, of Deering, Missouri, took second, and Patricia Brown, 14, of Birmingham, Alabama placed third.

There were 57 contestants that year, with 39 girls and 18 boys. Only one speller was a repeat contestant. The first place prize was $500 (plus $100 for expenses for a weekend trip to New York City and appearances on television), $300 for second, $100 for third, $20 each for the next 20 finishers, and $40 each for the remaining spellers.

Benson S. Alleman was the pronouncer.
