= 25th Scripps National Spelling Bee =

Spelling bee held in the United States in 1952

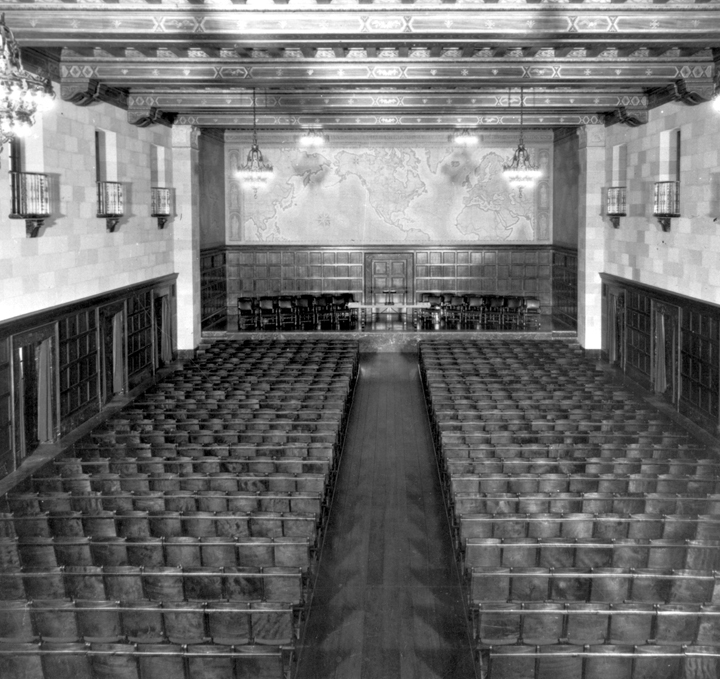
- Department of Commerce auditorium
- Date: May 22, 1952
- Location: Department of Commerce auditorium, Washington, D.C.
- Winner: Doris Ann Hall (13 at time of win)
- Sponsor: Winston-Salem Journal
- Sponsor location: Winston-Salem, North Carolina
- Winning word: vignette
- No. of contestants: 51
- Pronouncer: Benson S. Alleman

The 25th Scripps National Spelling Bee was held in Washington, District of Columbia on May 22, 1952, sponsored by the E.W. Scripps Company.

== Competition ==
The winner was Doris Ann Hall, 13, of Hudson, North Carolina, correctly spelling the word vignette. Second place fell to Majorie Follart, 13, of Crafton, Pennsylvania, who failed to correctly spell "farraginous", followed by Mary Ellen Rusk, age 12, of Washington in third place. Follart, a return speller, could also spell any word in reverse. Hall had also been in the prior year spelling bee, but had missed spelling the word "condign".

505 words were used in the competition.

There were 51 contestants this year, 31 girls and 20 boys, ranging in age from 10 to 14.

Benson S. Alleman was pronouncer. The first prize was $500 in cash (plus a loving cup and a plaque for the winner's school), and an appearance on The Ed Sullivan Show. Second place received $300, and third $100; the lowest prize to any contestant was $40.
