= Pratyush Buddiga =

American poker player (born 1989)

- Born: May 11, 1989 (age 37); New Zealand
- Table Booking: Pie-Chark; Graphe Fruit; Ocean Shark
World Series of Poker
- Bracelet: None
- Money finishes: 17
- Highest WSOP Main Event finish: 613th, 2011
World Poker Tour
- Title: None
- Money finishes: 3
European Poker Tour
- Money finishes: 5

Pratyush Buddiga (born May 11, 1989) is an American former professional poker player and spelling bee champion originally from New Zealand.

== Early life ==
Buddiga was born in New Zealand to Indian immigrant parents who moved to the United States when he was five years old. Two years later he moved to Colorado Springs, Colorado. In 2002, at the age of 13 Buddiga won the 75th Scripps National Spelling Bee after spelling prospicience earning him $12,000 and a scholarship. His brother Akshay competed in the 77th Scripps National Spelling Bee, where he finished 2nd. He attended Duke University and graduated in 2011.

== Poker ==
Buddiga began playing in live poker tournaments in 2010. In 2011, he finished 613th in the 2011 World Series of Poker earning $21,295.

In 2012, he finished 8th in the European Poker Tour hosted in Berlin earning $94,127. The following year he finished 8th in GuangDong Asia Millions earning $772,870.

In 2014, he won his first major tournament, the Fallsview Poker Classic, earning him $222,172. Later that year, he finished 3rd in the Super High Roller Event at the Asia Pacific Poker Tour earning $844,571. In 2014, Buddiga said "No matter how good I get at tournaments, I’ll never be better at poker than the best cash game players, guys like Doug Polk, for example".

Buddiga won the 2016 EPT Barcelona €25,000 High Roller event earning $780,011. The final three finishers agreed to a three-way deal based on ICM numbers.

In 2017, Buddiga finished 6th in the Super High Roller Bowl earning $1,000,000 in the process. The tournament was won by Christoph Vogelsang.

As of 2018, his total live tournament winnings exceed $6,400,000.
