= 20th Scripps National Spelling Bee =

Spelling bee held in the United States in 1947

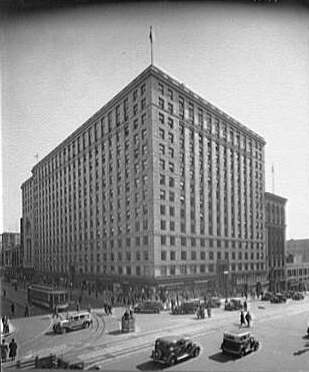
- National Press Building
- Date: May 29, 1947
- Location: Auditorium of the National Press Building, Washington, D.C.
- Winner: Mattie Lou Pollard (14 at time of win)
- Sponsor: Atlanta Journal
- Sponsor location: Atlanta, Georgia
- Winning word: chlorophyll
- No. of contestants: 35
- Pronouncer: Harold F. Harding

The 20th Scripps National Spelling Bee was held in Washington, District of Columbia on May 29, 1947, sponsored by the E.W. Scripps Company.

The winner was 14-year-old girl Mattie Lou Pollard of Thomaston, Georgia, who attended a one-room schoolhouse, correctly spelling the word chlorophyll. Pollard had placed sixth in the prior's years bee. Fourteen-year-old Sonya Rodolfo of Chicago (but a native of the Philippines) took second, and failed to spell "maggoty", followed by Suzanne Gelin of Parma, Ohio, who misspelled "sarsaparilla". Fourth place when to Sharon Gross of Akron, Ohio, who misspelled "bellicose" in the 31st round.

Pollard was the first Bee winner from Georgia. She later worked for the Department of Defense, and the National Park Service. She died in Norcross, Georgia on January 10, 2006.
