= 75th Scripps National Spelling Bee =

Spelling bee held in the United States in 2002

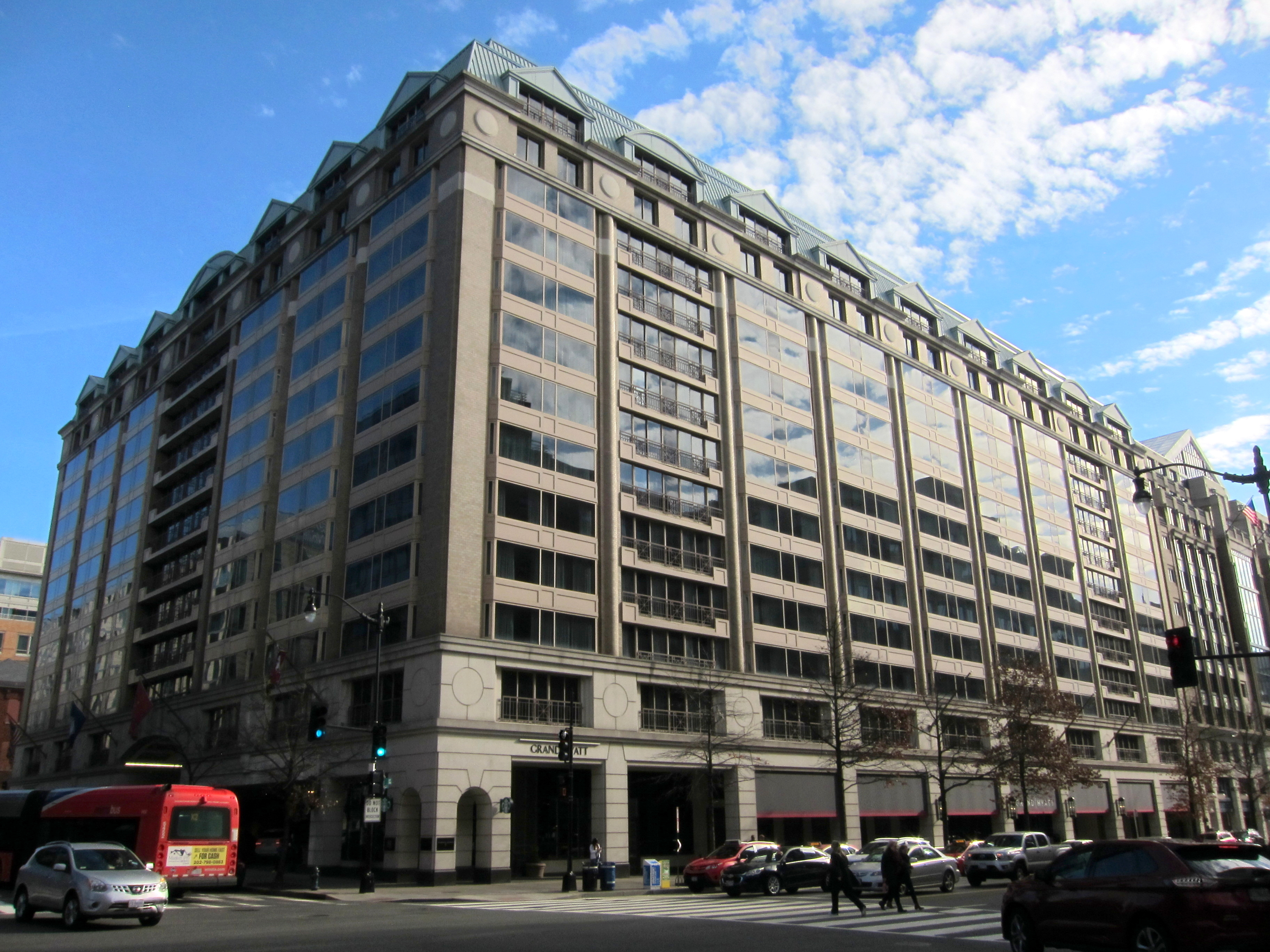
- The Grand Hyatt Washington in Washington, D.C., hosted the Scripps National Spelling Bee.
- Date: May 29–30, 2002
- Location: Grand Hyatt Washington, Washington, D.C.
- Winner: Pratyush Buddiga (13 at time of win)
- Sponsor: Rocky Mountain News
- Sponsor location: Denver, Colorado
- Winning word: prospicience
- No. of contestants: 250
- Pronouncer: Alex Cameron (last year)

The 75th Scripps National Spelling Bee was held in Washington, D.C., on May 29–30, 2002, sponsored by the E.W. Scripps Company.

250 contestants participated in the competition. Thirteen-year-old Pratyush Buddiga, from Colorado Springs, Colorado, won the competition in the 11th round by correctly spelling the word "prospicience". Steven Matthew Nalley of Starkville, Mississippi placed second.

This was the first year that a written test was used as a part of the competition, in order to keep the competition to two days. A three-day format was used for the first time the prior year. After making it through a first round of oral spelling on day one (where 75 spellers fell out), spellers had to take a 25-word written test which was considered round two. Ninety spellers made it to the second and final day of the bee.

The first place prize was $12,000 (and additional non-cash prizes), and $6,000 for second place.

This was the last year in which Alex Cameron served as pronouncer, a role he had for over 20 years, since the 1981 bee. After Cameron's death in 2003, Jacques Bailly became chief pronouncer.
