= 85th Scripps National Spelling Bee =

Spelling bee held in the United States in 2012

- Snigdha Nandipati (left), 2012 Scripps National Spelling Bee champion, receives her trophy. (photo by Mark Bowen)
- Date: May 27–31, 2012
- Location: Gaylord National Resort & Convention Center, National Harbor, Maryland
- Winner: Snigdha Nandipati (14 at time of win)
- Sponsor: San Diego Union-Tribune
- Sponsor location: San Diego, California
- Winning word: guetapens
- No. of contestants: 278
- Pronouncer: Jacques Bailly

The 85th Scripps National Spelling Bee was held at the Gaylord National, in Oxon Hill, Maryland (also D.C) from May 27 to May 31, 2012, and was broadcast live on ESPN3. The championship finals occurred on May 31, 2012.

== Results ==
The winner was 14-year-old Snigdha Nandipati from San Diego, California. Her winning word was guetapens. She was the fifth consecutive Indian American, to win the competition and, the tenth Indian-American champion in the past fourteen competitions. The runner-up was Stuti Mishra from West Melbourne, Florida, who misspelled schwarmerei and was eliminated.

Nandipati received a $30,000 cash prize, an engraved trophy from the E. W. Scripps Company, a $2,500 savings bond from Merriam-Webster, a $5,000 scholarship from the Sigma Phi Epsilon Educational Foundation, $2,600 in reference works from Encyclopædia Britannica, Inc., and an online language course and Barnes & Noble Nook from Middlebury Interactive Languages. Her school received a plaque from Scripps. All finalists received a DVD of the 2011 Encyclopædia Britannica Ultimate Reference Suite and contestants received a cash prize from Scripps, as well as a CD-ROM of Webster's Third New International Dictionary.

== Round breakdown ==
278 spellers competed this year, 136 boys and 142 girls. Illinois and Ohio sent the most spellers, 18 from each. Twenty spellers had a family member participate in a prior bee. The youngest was 6-year-old Lori Ann Madison of Virginia, the youngest ever speller to qualify at that point in the Bee's history.

Round One was a computerized spelling test taken by all contestants. Spellers had to spell 50 words, but only 25 counted toward each speller’s preliminary score. Scores from the test were combined with the results of Rounds Two and Three to determine the semifinalists. All 278 spellers were onstage during Rounds Two and Three. No one was eliminated during those rounds. Immediately after the conclusion of Round Three, officials determined the semifinalists. During the semifinals, a speller was out of the competition once he or she misspells. If only one speller correctly spelled a word during a round, that speller was asked to spell another word in a new round. If that word was spelled correctly, that speller would be named champion of the spelling bee.

== Word list championship round ==
- psammon
- dedans
- Sahel
- harengiform
- canities
- ridotto
- maieutic
- turnverein
- otosteon
- ajimez
- porwigle
- melopoeia
- phthisiology
- distelfink
- rouille
- yttriferous
- luteovirescent
- chatoyant
- ericeticolous
- quattrocento
- vetiver
- geistlich
- saccharolytic
- prolegomenon
- schwannoma
- admittatur
- chionablepsia
- arrondissement
- schwarmerei
- guetapens

== Statistics ==
Of the 278 spellers, 136 were boys and 142 were girls. There was one six-year-old, two eight-year-olds, one nine-year-old, 13 ten-year-olds, 26 eleven-year-olds, 69 twelve-year-olds, 96 thirteen-year-olds, 67 fourteen-year-olds, and three fifteen-year-olds. Six-year-old Lori Anne Madison was the youngest speller in bee history. 20 spellers had at least one relative who has competed in previous national finals. 52 spellers have competed twice in competition, 14 have competed three times, four have competed four times, and two have competed five times.
