= 36th Scripps National Spelling Bee =

Spelling bee held in the United States in 1963

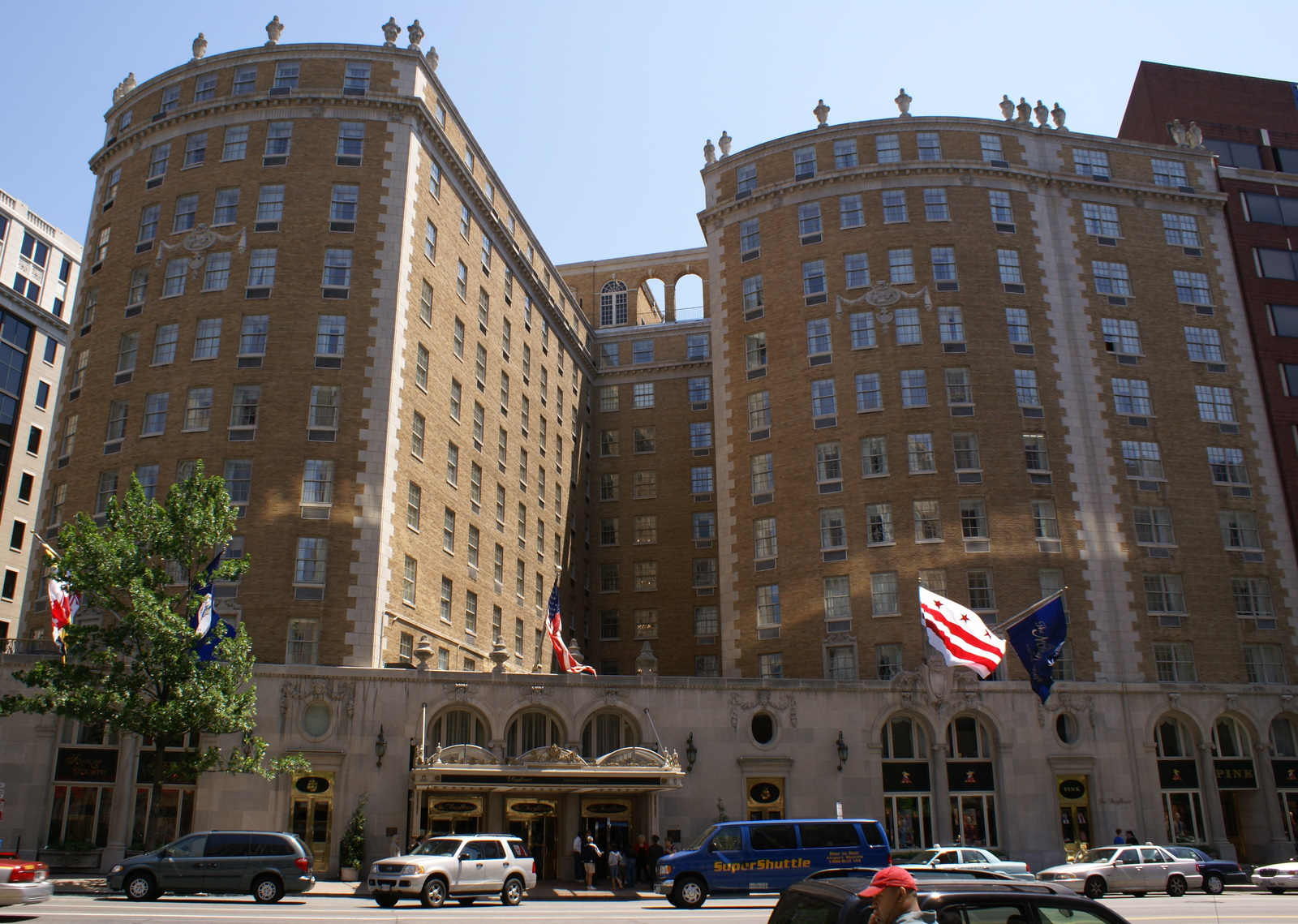
- The Mayflower Hotel, site of the 36th National Spelling Bee
- Date: June 12–13, 1963
- Location: The Mayflower Hotel in Washington, D.C.
- Winner: Glen Van Slyke III (13 at time of win)
- Sponsor: Knoxville News Sentinel
- Sponsor location: Knoxville, Tennessee
- Winning word: equipage
- No. of contestants: 69
- Pronouncer: Richard R. Baker

The 36th Scripps National Spelling Bee was held in Washington, D.C., on June 12–13, 1963, sponsored by the E.W. Scripps Company.

13-year-old eighth-grader Glen Van Slyke III of Oak Ridge, Tennessee, sponsored by the Knoxville News Sentinel, won the competition in 33 rounds, correctly spelling the final word equipage. His strategy involved spelling very slowly to ensure accuracy as well as asking for derivations and roots of every word. Second place went to Elaine Piecuch (age 14) of Winslow, Maine, who failed to correctly spell biliousness, followed in third by Gary Barringer (age 14) of East Liverpool, Ohio. The top prizes were $1000, $500, and $250.

There were 69 contestants this year, 39 girls and 30 boys. Nine came from Texas, eight from Ohio, six from Pennsylvania, and five from New York. Four spellers were return contestants.

A record number of 752 words were used in the competition, besting the prior year's record of 718.
