= 58th Scripps National Spelling Bee =

Spelling bee held in the United States in 1985

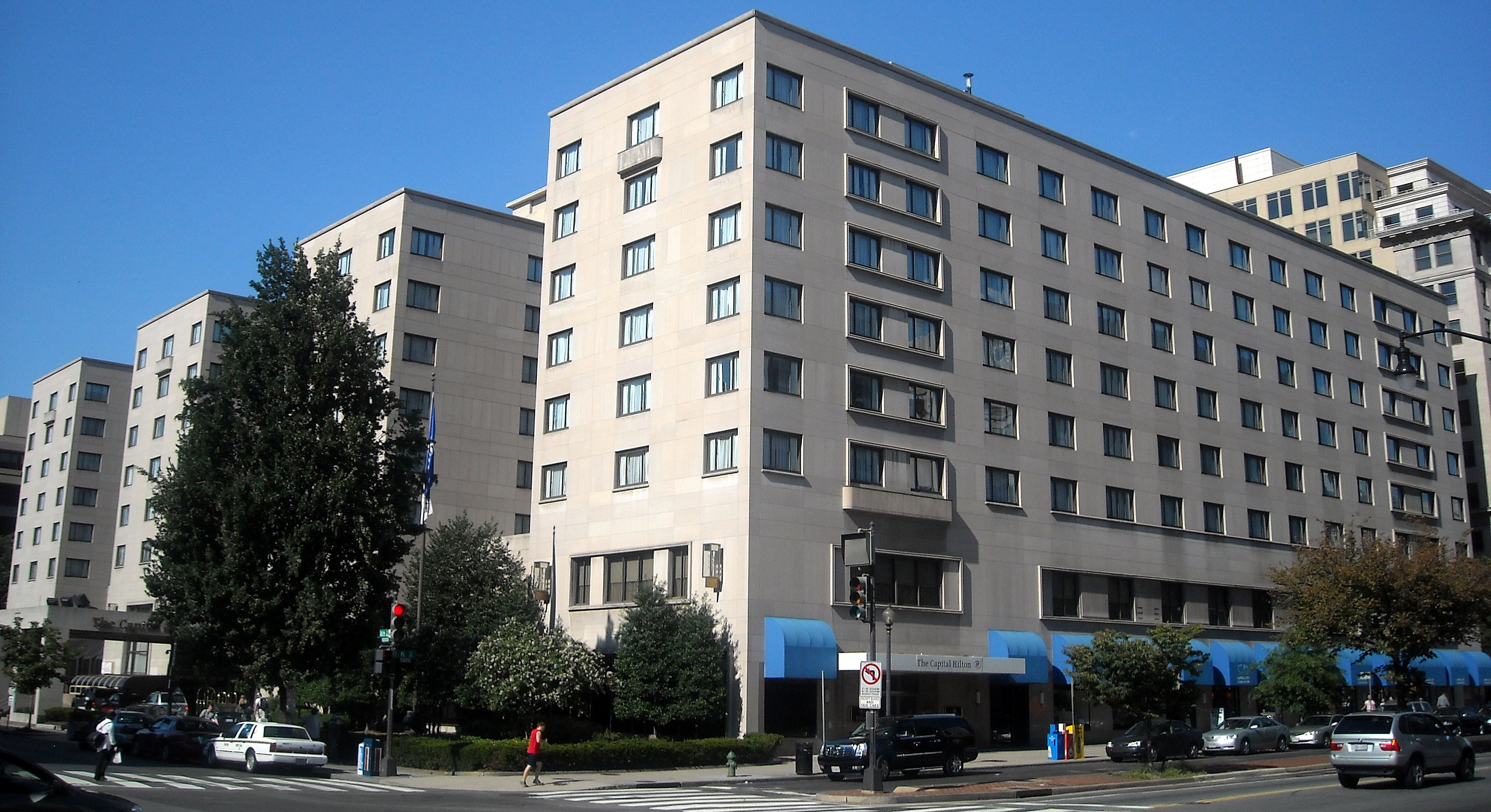
- The Capital Hilton, site of the 58th National Spelling Bee
- Date: June 5–6, 1985
- Location: The Capital Hilton in Washington, D.C.
- Winner: Balu Natarajan (13 at time of win)
- Sponsor: Chicago Tribune
- Sponsor location: Chicago, Illinois
- Winning word: milieu
- No. of contestants: 168
- Pronouncer: Alex Cameron

The 58th Scripps National Spelling Bee was held in Washington, D.C. at the Capital Hilton on June 5–6, 1985, sponsored by the E.W. Scripps Company.

The winner was 13-year-old eighth-grader Balu Natarajan of Bolingbrook, Illinois, in his third appearance at the Bee (he finished 45th in 1983 and 63rd in 1984), the first winner from the Chicago area. He spelled "milieu" for the win. Second place went to 13-year-old Kate Lingley of Dover-Foxcroft, Maine, who missed "farrago". Another 13-year-old, Tanya Solomon of Kansas City, Missouri, took third, missing "syllepsis".

168 spellers competed in the Bee, 17 more than competed the previous year. There were 67 boys and 101 girls, including 19 repeat contestants, one 9-year-old, two 10-year-olds, 19 at age 11, 26 at age 12, 65 at age 13, and 55 at age 14. A total of 719 words were used.

Natarajan was the first Indian-American to win the Bee, and has been credited for inspiring the later dominance of Indian-Americans in the bee.

In addition to non-cash gifts, the first-place winner received $1,000. Total prize money to all finalists was $10,500.
