= 29th Scripps National Spelling Bee =

Spelling bee held in the United States in 1956

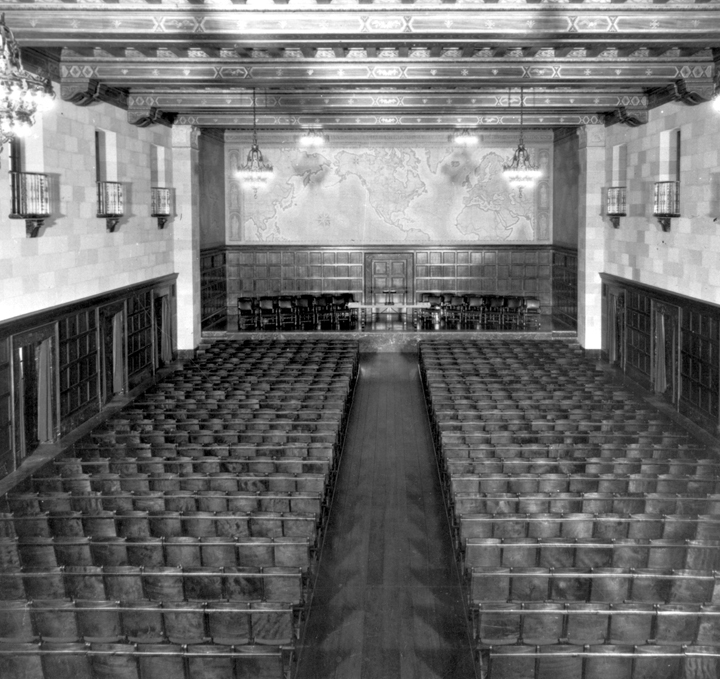
- Department of Commerce auditorium
- Date: May 17, 1956
- Location: Department of Commerce auditorium, Washington, D.C.
- Winner: Melody Sachko (13 at time of win)
- Sponsor: Pittsburgh Press
- Sponsor location: Pittsburgh, Pennsylvania
- Winning word: condominium
- No. of contestants: 63
- Pronouncer: Benson S. Alleman

The 29th Scripps National Spelling Bee was held at the Department of Commerce auditorium in Washington, District of Columbia on May 17, 1956, sponsored by the E.W. Scripps Company.

The winner was 13-year-old Melody Sachko of Pittsburgh, Pennsylvania, correctly spelling the word "condominium." Second place went to Sandra Owen, a 13-year-old from Justus, Ohio, who failed to spell "afflatus." Third-place was taken by Ann Malone Warren, 13, from Monticello, Georgia, and fourth went to Karin Carter, 12, of San Francisco, California.

There were 63 spellers this year, and boys (34) outnumbered girls (29) for the first time. Three spellers were return contestants, including Sachko, who had placed 6th in 1954. 632 words were used, and the Bee took eight hours to complete.

The first place award was $1,000, doubled from the previous year, with $500 for second place and $250 for third. The next five each received $100, the next ten $50, and the remaining 45 spellers $25 each.
