= 28th Scripps National Spelling Bee =

Spelling bee held in the United States in 1955

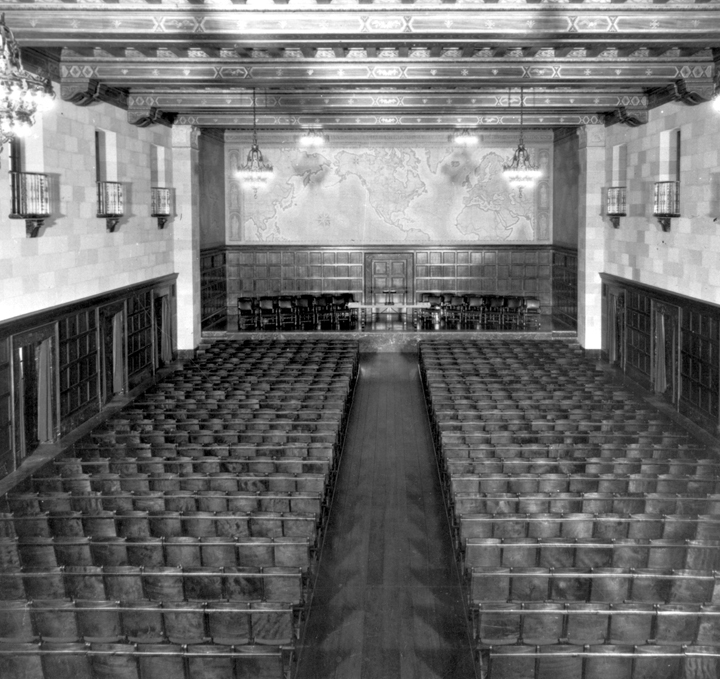
- Department of Commerce auditorium
- Date: May 19, 1955
- Location: Department of Commerce auditorium, Washington, D.C.
- Winner: Sandra Sloss (13 at time of win)
- Sponsor: St. Louis Globe-Democrat
- Sponsor location: St. Louis, Missouri
- Winning word: crustaceology
- No. of contestants: 62
- Pronouncer: Benson S. Alleman

The 28th Scripps National Spelling Bee was held in Washington, D.C., on May 19, 1955, with the final rounds at the Department of Commerce auditorium, and was sponsored by the E.W. Scripps Company.

The winner was 13-year-old Sandra Sloss of Granite City, Illinois, correctly spelling the word crustaceology. Jean Copeland of Prescott, Arizona, placed second. Naomi Klein, 12, of Brooklyn, New York, placed third after missing quincunx. The prior year's runner-up, William Kelley of Kennett, Missouri, placed fourth.

There were 62 contestants in the 1955 Bee, 37 girls and 25 boys, ages 11–14. Three contestants were black, noted to be a new record at the time.

The first place prize was $500, the last year before the grand prize was doubled to $1,000. Second place received $300, and third $100. The next 20 received $50 each, and the remaining 39 received $40 each.
