= 22nd Scripps National Spelling Bee =

Spelling bee held in the United States in 1949

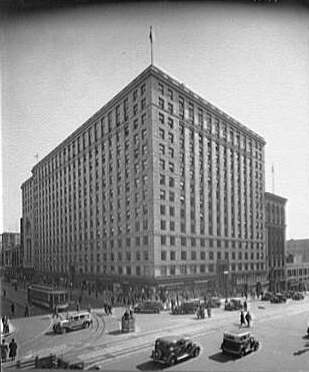
- National Press Building
- Date: Friday, May 27, 1949
- Location: Washington, D.C.
- Winner: Kim Calvin (13 at time of win)
- Sponsor: Canton Repository
- Sponsor location: Canton, Ohio
- Winning word: onerous
- No. of contestants: 49
- Pronouncer: Benson S. Alleman

The 22nd Scripps National Spelling Bee was held in Washington, District of Columbia on Friday, May 27, 1949, at the auditorium of the National Press Building, sponsored by the E.W. Scripps Company.

== Competition ==
The winner was 13-year-old boy Kim Calvin of Canton, Ohio and sponsored by the Canton Repository, correctly spelling the word dulcimer, followed by onerous, and winning $500. James Shea, 13, of Brooklyn, New York, and sponsored by the New York World-Telegram, placed second (missing dulcimer). Worn out from almost five hours of spelling, Shea almost fainted at the end of the bee. Fred Shoup of Palo Alto, California placed third and won $100. It was the first time in the Bee's history that boy spellers took the top three slots, and Calvin was the 7th boy to win in the 22 Bees held to date.

There were 49 contestants in this bee, and 614 words were used over 58 rounds.
