= 6th Scripps National Spelling Bee =

Spelling bee held at the National Museum, Washington, D.C., in 1930

6th National Spelling Bee
- Date: May 27, 1930
- Location: National Museum in Washington, D.C.
- Winner: Helen Jensen (14 at time of win)
- Sponsor: The Des Moines Register and Tribune
- Sponsor location: Des Moines, Iowa
- Winning word: albumen
- No. of contestants: 24
- Pronouncer: Charles E. Hill and Stephen Kramer

The 6th National Spelling Bee was held at the National Museum in Washington, D.C., on May 27, 1930. Scripps-Howard would not sponsor the Bee until 1941.

The winner was 14-year-old Helen Jensen of Council Bluffs, Iowa, who correctly spelled the word albumen. Ruth Des Jardins of Michigan came in second after stumbling on "asceticism," followed by Mildred Froning of Indiana, who went out on "conflagration".

The final hour of the contest was broadcast on radio, starting at 3 p.m. Eastern Standard Time, by the National Broadcasting Company.

There were 24 contestants in this year's competition. The first-place winner received $1,000, while second place was awarded $500, and third place received $250.
