= 39th Scripps National Spelling Bee =

Spelling bee held in the United States in 1966

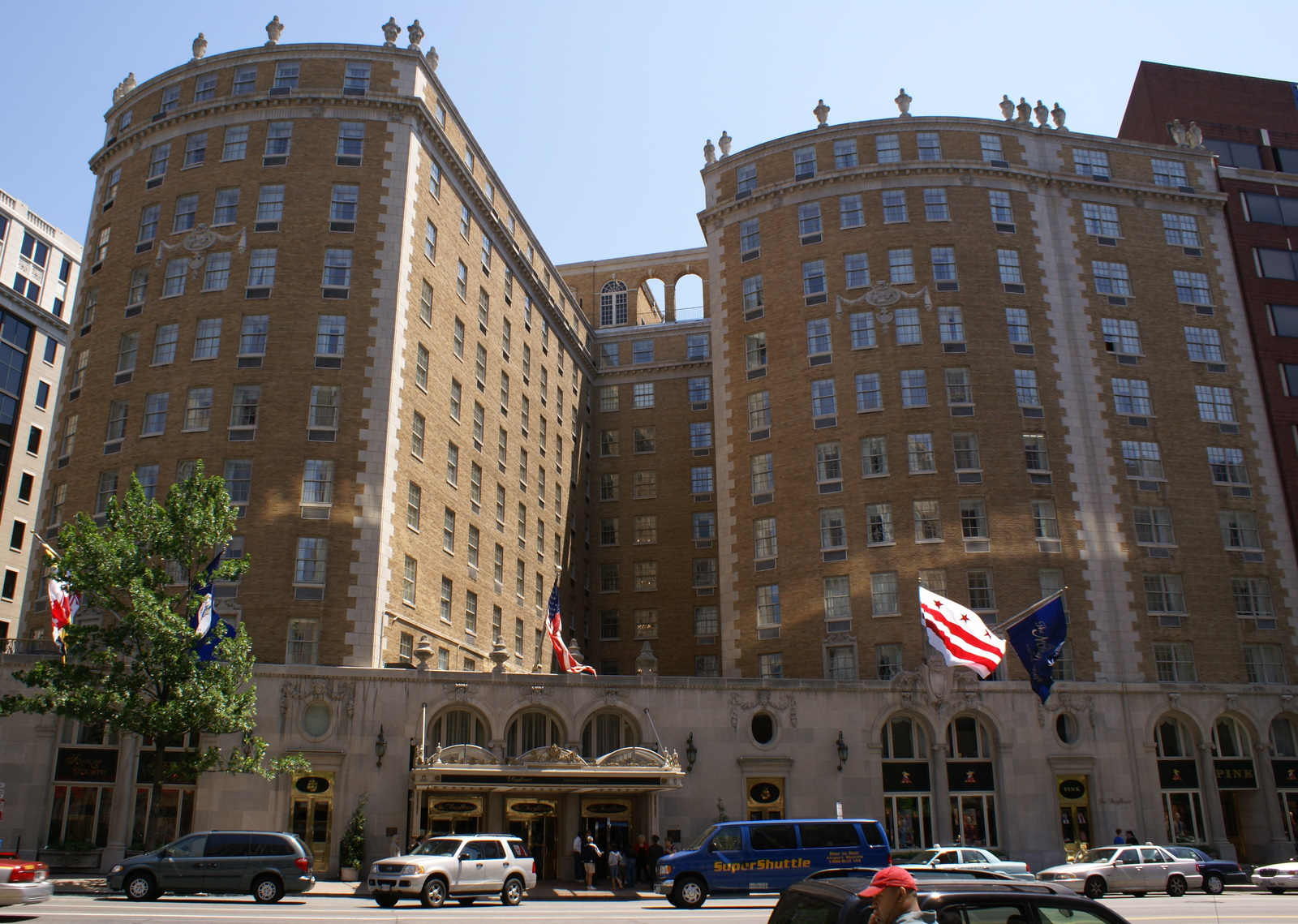
- The Mayflower Hotel, site of the 39th National Spelling Bee
- Date: June 1966
- Location: The Mayflower Hotel in Washington, D.C.
- Winner: Robert A. Wake (13 at time of win)
- Sponsor: Houston Chronicle
- Sponsor location: Houston, Texas
- Winning word: ratoon
- No. of contestants: 71
- Pronouncer: Richard R. Baker

The 39th Scripps National Spelling Bee was held in Washington, D.C. in June 1966, sponsored by the E.W. Scripps Company.

13-year-old Robert A. Wake of Houston, Texas won by spelling "ratoon", a word which he had "never heard of". Second place went to Beth Sherrill, 14, of Lucy, Tennessee, who incorrectly spelled "sachem", followed in third place by Sonya Gilliam, 13, of Lubbock, Texas, who could not spell "muumuu".

There were 71 contestants this year. The top three cash prizes were $1000, $500, and $250.

In the fourth round, Rosalie Elliot, 11, of Central, South Carolina spelled "avowal" with such an accent that the judges weren't sure whether she used an "a" or "e" as the second to last letter. When the judges eventually asked her, she admitted she had spelled it wrong, getting a standing ovation for her honesty. This has become an often repeated anecdote.
