= 33rd Scripps National Spelling Bee =

Spelling bee held in the United States in 1960

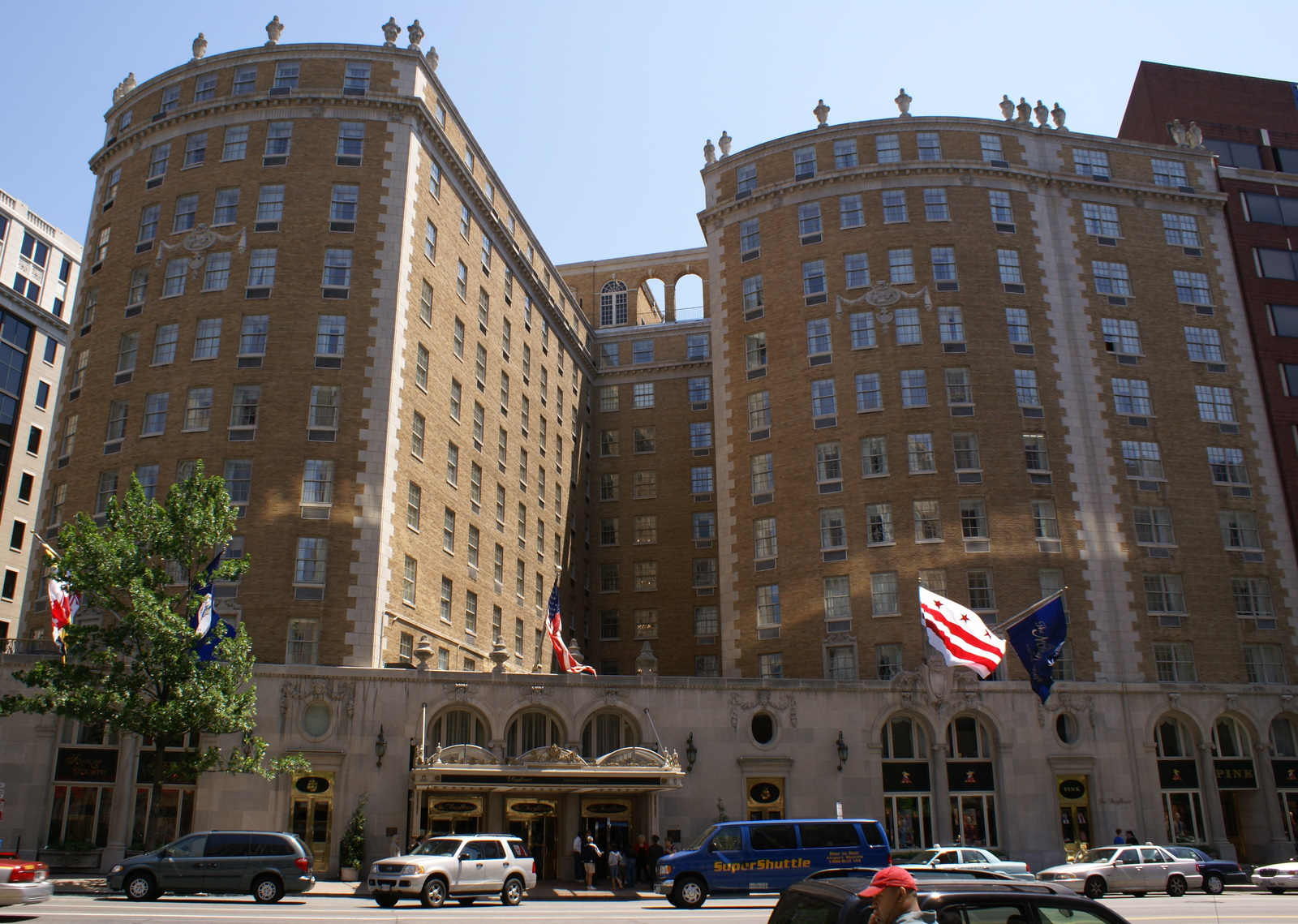
- The Mayflower Hotel, site of the 33rd National Spelling Bee
- Date: June 8–9, 1960
- Location: The Mayflower Hotel in Washington, D.C.
- Winner: Henry Feldman (13 at time of win)
- Sponsor: Knoxville News Sentinel
- Sponsor location: Knoxville, Tennessee
- Winning word: eudaemonic
- No. of contestants: 73
- Pronouncer: Benson S. Alleman (last year)

The 33rd Scripps National Spelling Bee was held at the Mayflower Hotel in Washington, District of Columbia on June 8–9, 1960, by the E.W. Scripps Company.

The winner was Henry Feldman (age 13) of Oak Ridge, Tennessee and sponsored by the Knoxville News Sentinel, correctly spelling the word "eudaemonic". It was Feldman's third time in the competition; he had placed 20th the prior year. Second place went to Betty Jean Altschul of Norfolk, Virginia, who had misspelled "velleity". Altschul was also the shortest competitor, at 4 foot 6 inches, and stood on a dictionary in the final round to use the microphone.

The competition had 73 entrants, 48 girls and 25 boys. Twenty-four (16 girls and 8 boys) advanced past the first day of spelling into the finals. Benson Alleman, an English professor from Kentucky, was the pronouncer, for the 13th and final time, as he died before the next year's competition.
