= 18th Scripps National Spelling Bee =

Spelling bee held in the United States in 1942

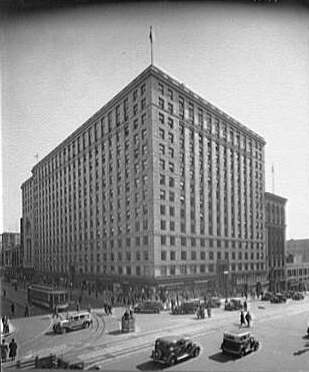
- National Press Building
- Date: May 26, 1942
- Location: Auditorium of the National Press Building, Washington, D.C.
- Winner: Richard Earnhart (11 at time of win)
- Sponsor: El Paso Herald-Post
- Sponsor location: El Paso, Texas
- Winning word: sacrilegious
- No. of contestants: 26

The 18th Scripps National Spelling Bee was held in Washington, District of Columbia on May 26, 1942, by the E.W. Scripps Company. There was no National Spelling Bee after this competition until 1946 due to World War II.

The winner was 11-year-old Richard Earnhart of El Paso, Texas, correctly spelling the word sacrilegious. Second place went to 15-year-old Margaret Montgomery of Iowa, followed by Hazel M. LaPrade of Massachusetts, who misspelled "paucity".

Earnhart was the first 11-year-old to win the bee since Frank Neuhauser won the 1st bee in 1925.
