= 43rd Scripps National Spelling Bee =

Spelling bee held in the United States in 1970

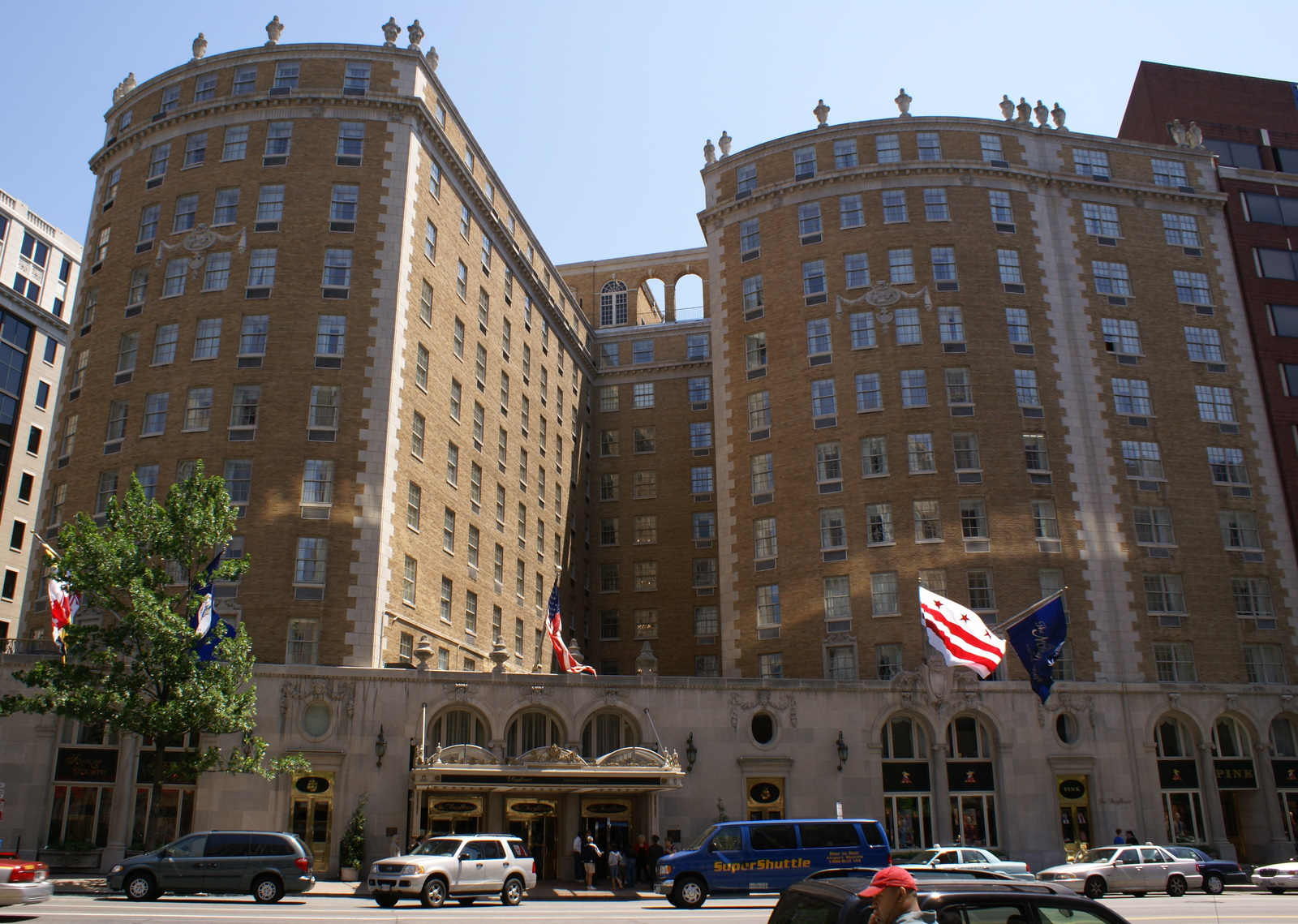
- The Mayflower Hotel, site of the 43rd National Spelling Bee
- Date: June 3–4, 1970
- Location: The Mayflower Hotel in Washington, D.C.
- Winner: Libby Childress (14 at time of win)
- Sponsor: Winston-Salem Journal & Sentinel
- Sponsor location: Winston-Salem, North Carolina
- Winning word: croissant
- No. of contestants: 74
- Pronouncer: Richard R. Baker

The 43rd Scripps National Spelling Bee was held in Washington, D.C. at the Mayflower Hotel on June 3–4, 1970, sponsored by the E.W. Scripps Company.

The winner was 14-year-old Libby Childress of Mount Airy, North Carolina, with the winning word "croissant". The competition ended with an 18-word duel with 14-year-old Tom Moe Jr. of Denver, who eventually misspelled "corymb" as "chorimbe".

There were 74 spellers this year, 44 girls and 30 boys. The first-place prize was $1000 (and a trip to New York City), $500 for second, $250 for third, $100 for next five, $75 for next ten, and $50 each for the remaining spellers.

As of 2015, Childress is the last entrant from North Carolina to win the national contest.
