= 16th Scripps National Spelling Bee =

Spelling bee held in the United States in 1940

- 1940 top three. Winner Kuykendall in the center, flanked by O'Keefe on her right (Hoboken placard), and Shea on her left (Nebraska).
- Date: May 28, 1940
- Location: Auditorium of the National Press Building, Washington, D.C.
- Winner: Laurel Kuykendall (14 at time of win)
- Sponsor: Knoxville News Sentinel
- Sponsor location: Knoxville, Tennessee
- Winning word: therapy
- No. of contestants: 22
- Pronouncer: Harold F. Harding

The 16th National Spelling Bee was held in Washington, D.C., on May 28, 1940. Scripps-Howard did not sponsor the Bee until the next year.

The winner was 14-year-old girl Laurel Kuykendall, correctly spelling the word therapy. Elizabeth O'Keefe, a 13-year-old girl from New Jersey, took second place after failing to correctly spell "plantain", followed by Eleanor Shea of Nebraska in third.

There were 22 spellers this year, and the prizes were $500 for first, $200 for second, and $100 for third.

Harold F. Harding of George Washington University was the pronouncer. He earned a round of applause when he slipped and spelled the word "fore" himself, instead of waiting for the speller to do so.
