= 10th Scripps National Spelling Bee =

Spelling bee held in the United States in 1934

10th National Spelling Bee
- Date: May 29, 1934
- Location: National Museum in Washington, D.C.
- Winner: Sarah Wilson (12 at time of win)
- Sponsor: Portland Evening Express
- Sponsor location: Portland, Maine
- Winning word: brethren
- No. of contestants: 19
- Pronouncer: Charles E. Hill and H.E. Warner

The 10th National Spelling Bee was held at the National Museum in Washington, D.C., on May 29, 1934. Scripps-Howard would not sponsor the Bee until 1941.

The winner was 12-year-old Sarah Wilson of Gray, Maine, sponsored by the Portland Evening Express, correctly spelling the word brethren. She had also competed in the finals the prior year. James Wilson, age 13, of Canton, Illinois, placed second after misspelling deteriorating, followed by Helen Sullivan, age 13, of Connecticut.

The prizes for the top three were $500, $300, and $100. The bee was broadcast on the radio, and when Sarah was asked if she had a message for her father, she responded on air "You remember Daddy, you promised me another $500 if I won first place!" She did say she wanted to use the money for college.

Wilson (later married surname Garrett), graduated from Pennell Institute in her Maine hometown in 1938, the University of Vermont in 1941, and Yale Law School in 1944. She worked in Washington, D.C., as an attorney for the Internal Revenue Service for 41 years, retiring in 1986. She died in Maine on June 10, 1998. As of 2026, she is the only National Spelling Bee winner from Maine.
