= 54th Scripps National Spelling Bee =

Spelling bee held in the United States in 1981

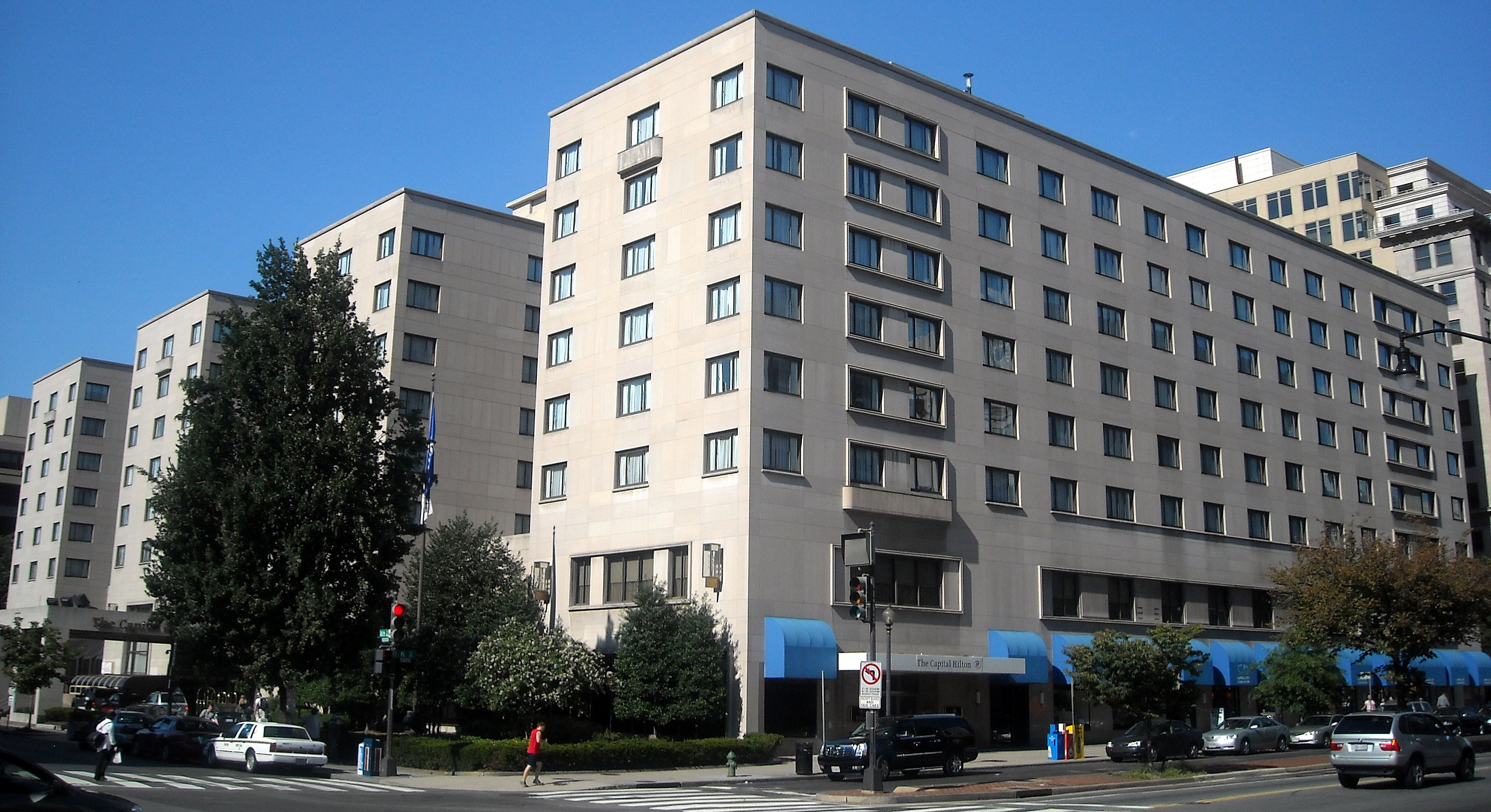
- The Capital Hilton, site of the 54th National Spelling Bee
- Date: June 3–4, 1981
- Location: The Capital Hilton in Washington, D.C.
- Winner: Paige Pipkin (13 at time of win)
- Sponsor: El Paso Herald-Post
- Sponsor location: El Paso, Texas
- Winning word: sarcophagus
- No. of contestants: 120
- Pronouncer: Alex Cameron (first time as chief pronouncer)

The 54th Scripps National Spelling Bee was held in Washington, D.C. at the Capital Hilton on June 3–4, 1981, sponsored by the E.W. Scripps Company.

The winner was 13-year-old Paige Pipkin of El Paso, Texas, who had placed second in the prior year's Bee. 12-year-old Jason Johnson Jr. of St. Joseph, Michigan, placed second, missing "Philippic." Pipkin spelled that word correctly followed by "sarcophagus" for the win. Pipkin had earlier missed "vitrine" but Johnson also missed it. Third-place went to 13-year-old Danielle Marie Spinelli of Staunton, Virginia, who missed "polyonymous."

There were 120 spellers this year, and a total of 571 words were used. 46 spellers made it to the second day. Round 4 on day one was especially harsh on the contestants, knocking out 44 spellers on 90 words. The final rounds were completed shortly before noon on June 4. Alex Cameron was the official pronouncer for the first time, replacing Richard R. Baker, who had retired. The top prize was $1,000, followed by $500 for second and $250 for third. The next five spellers each received $100.

Pipkin later joined the staff of the Bee and served as its executive director (under her married name Paige Kimble) from 1996 to 2020.
