= 53rd Scripps National Spelling Bee =

Spelling bee held in the United States in 1980

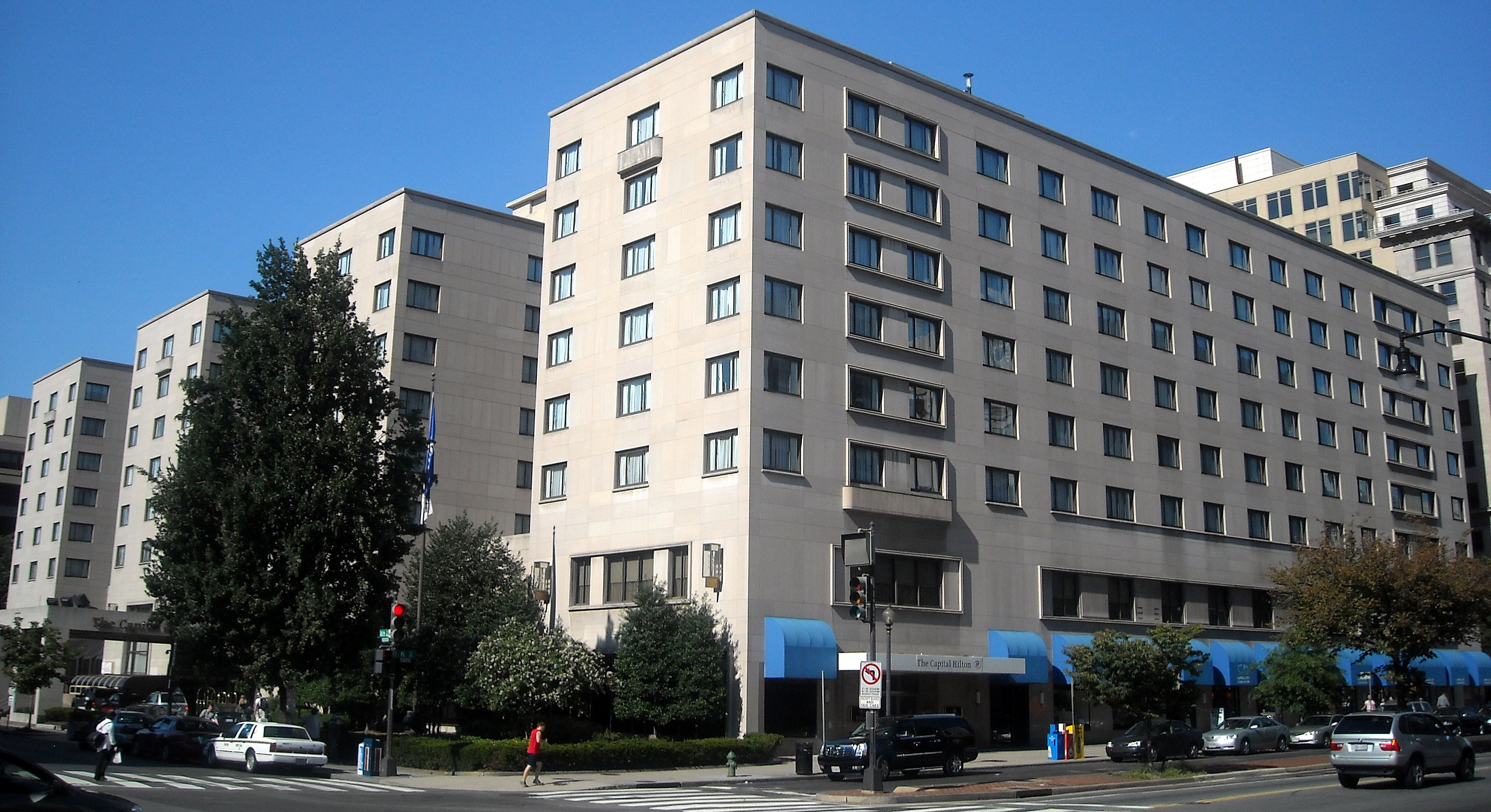
- The Capital Hilton, site of the 53rd National Spelling Bee
- Date: May 28–29, 1980
- Location: The Capital Hilton in Washington, D.C.
- Winner: Jacques Bailly (14 at time of win)
- Sponsor: Rocky Mountain News
- Sponsor location: Denver, Colorado
- Winning word: elucubrate
- No. of contestants: 112
- Pronouncer: Richard R. Baker (last year)

The 53rd Scripps National Spelling Bee was held in Washington, D.C. at the Capital Hilton on May 28–29, 1980, sponsored by the E.W. Scripps Company.

The winner was 14-year-old Jacques Bailly of Denver, Colorado, an eighth-grader at St. Vincent de Paul School, winning on the word "elucubrate" (which is a learned discourse in writing). In 1979, Bailly had missed out on a spot in the National Bee when he lost a regional competition to Katie Kerwin, who went on to win that year. Second place went to Paige Pipkin, age 12, from El Paso, Texas, who misspelled "glitch". She went on to win the Bee the next year. Rosalind Dambaugh of Harmony, Pennsylvania placed third.

112 spellers competed this year, 66 girls and 46 boys. Eighty spellers were eliminated in six sounds of spelling on the first day of competition, leaving 32 contestants (18 boys and 14 girls).

By 10am on day two, eight spellers remained. By round 11, they were down to five spellers. The competition ended in the 14th round, with a total of 610 words used.

The first place prize was $1,000, with $500 for second, and $250 for third. Richard R. Baker served as the pronouncer for his final year, having first served in the role in the 1961 bee. This was the first year that the Bee was held at the Capital Hilton, where it would remain through the 1995 bee.

Bailly went on to become the Bee's pronouncer in 2003.
