= Alex Cameron (academic) =

American academic (1937–2003)

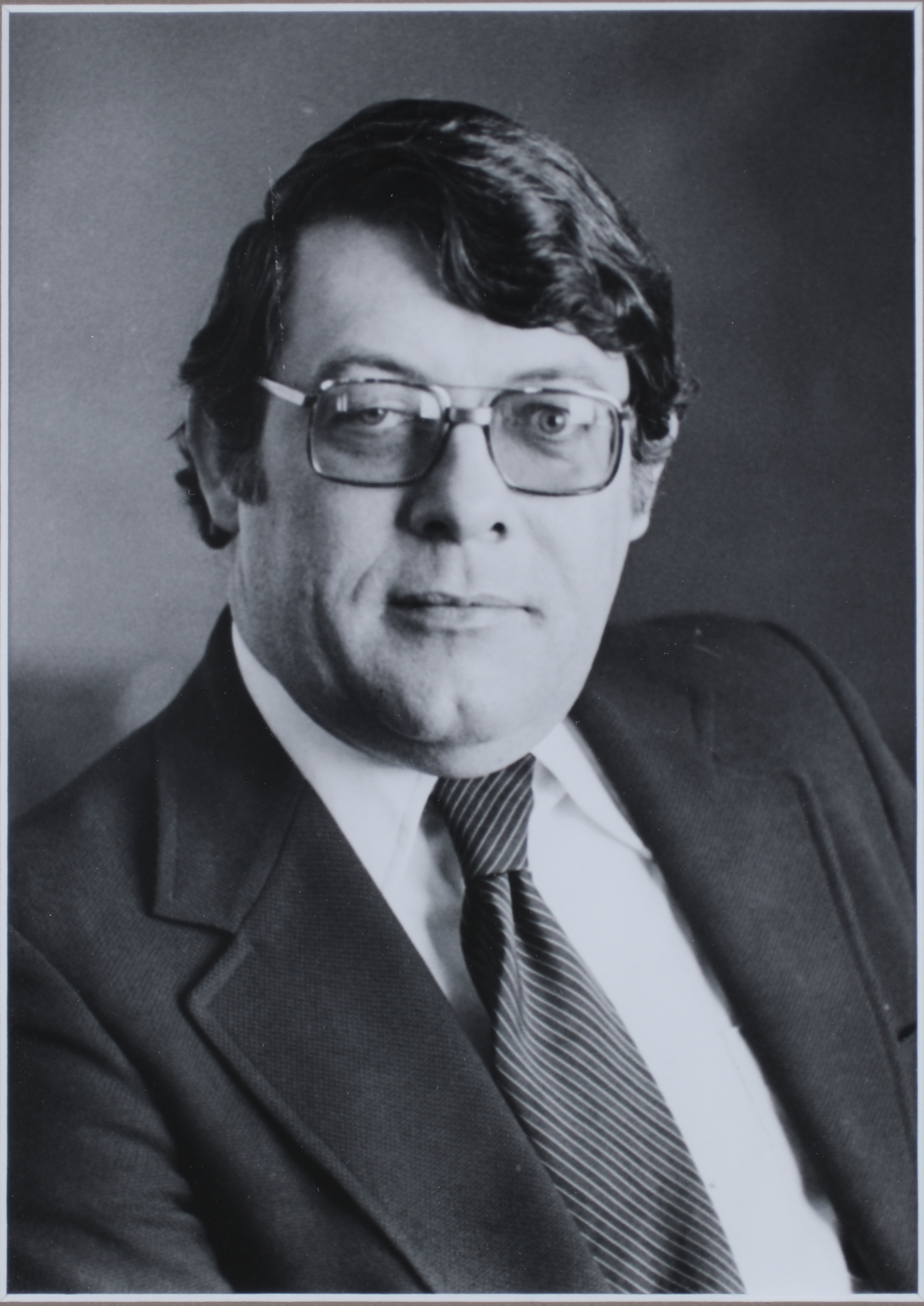
Portrait of Alex J. Cameron.

Alex J. Cameron (1937 – February 24, 2003) was an English professor at the University of Dayton and the official pronouncer of the Scripps National Spelling Bee from 1981 to 2002.

== Biography ==
Cameron grew up in Dearborn, Michigan, and attended the University of Notre Dame. He taught American literature and the history of the English language at the University of Dayton from 1964 until his death in 2003. In 1978, he began accompanying fellow Dayton professor Richard R. Baker to the National Spelling Bee, where Baker had served as official pronouncer since 1960. After Baker retired, spelling bee officials asked Cameron to take his place. National Spelling Bee director Paige Kimble said that Cameron had "a rich voice" and "could relate genuinely and positively with children of all different backgrounds and demeanors."

In February 2003, Cameron died at age 65 in his Kettering, Ohio, home of an apparent heart attack. Jacques Bailly succeeded him as the National Spelling Bee's pronouncer. The Cameron Corner is a collection of books and a comfortable reading nook, located in the northeast corner of the University of Dayton Roesch Library's fifth floor. The majority of the books belonged to Cameron. The space was established to honor Cameron and his love of reading.
