= 90th Scripps National Spelling Bee =

Spelling bee held in the United States in 2017

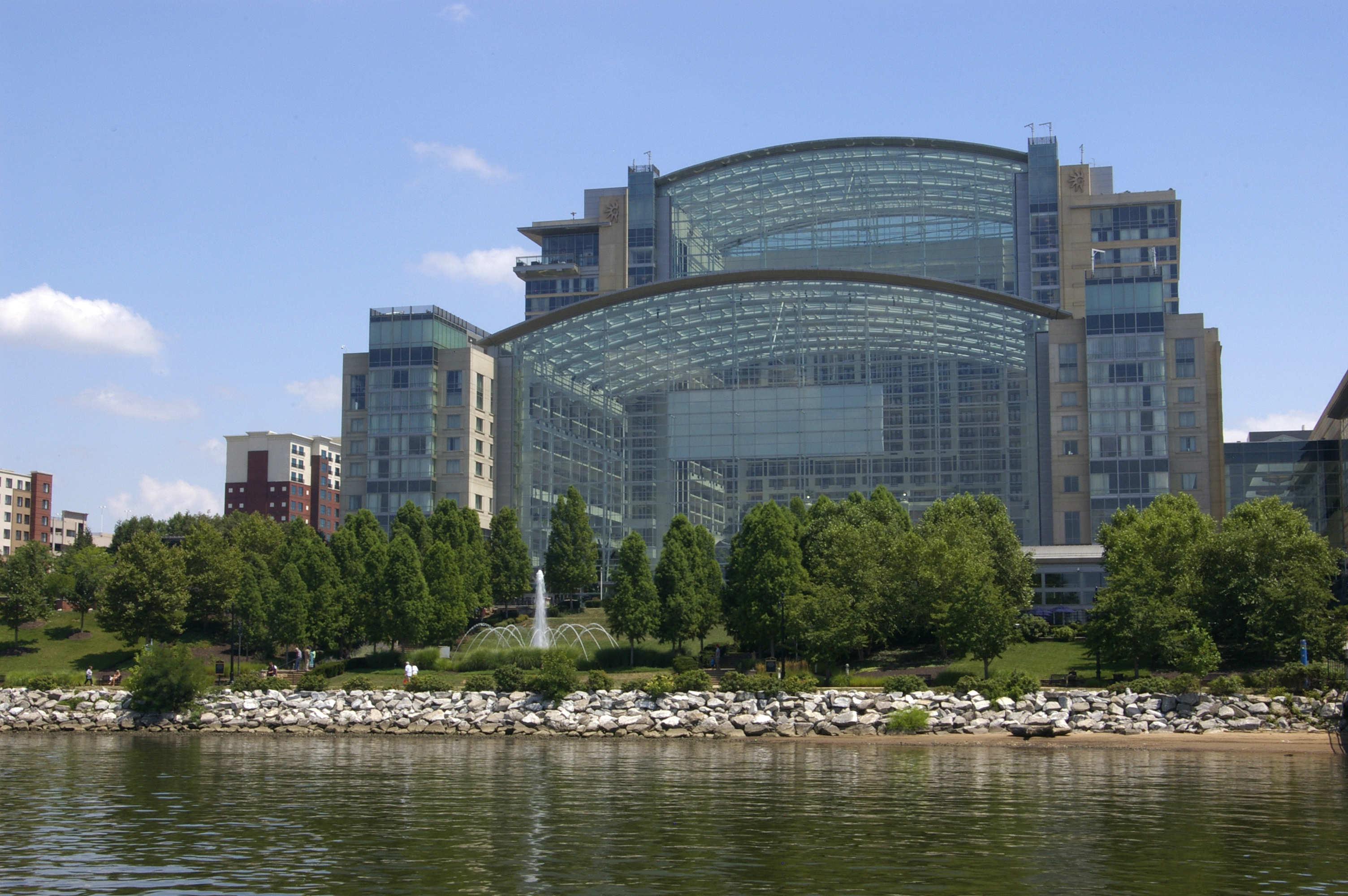
- Date: May 30 – June 1, 2017
- Location: Gaylord National Resort & Convention Center, National Harbor, Maryland
- Winner: Ananya Vinay (12 at time of win)
- Sponsor: The Fresno Bee
- Sponsor location: Fresno, California
- Winning word: marocain
- No. of contestants: 291
- Pronouncer: Jacques Bailly

The 90th Scripps National Spelling Bee was held at the Gaylord National Resort & Convention Center in National Harbor, Maryland, United States from May 30 to June 1, 2017, with "Bee Week" events running for spellers between May 28 and June 3, and televised coverage on May 31 and June 1. Ananya Vinay, 12, won the competition by successfully spelling "marocain" in the final round. She had also placed 172nd place in the 2016 Scripps National Spelling Bee.

== Competition ==
=== 291 entrants ===
There were 291 entrants. To date, this was second only to the 293 who spelled in the 2009 bee. They came from all 50 U.S. states, the District of Columbia, U.S. territories American Samoa, Guam, Puerto Rico, and U.S. Virgin Islands, as well as Department of Defense schools in Europe. Six other countries also have entrants: the Bahamas, Canada, Ghana, Jamaica, Japan, and South Korea. A link to the results may be found at https://secure.spellingbee.com/public/results/2017/round_results

The spellers ranged from age 6 to 15, made up of 138 girls and 153 boys. 66% attended public schools, 23% private or parochial schools, and the rest either attended a charter school or are home schooled. For the first time, a 5-year-old qualified for Bee, Edith Fuller of Tulsa, Oklahoma, though she turned 6 by the time of the national Bee. There were 20 spellers this year age 10 or younger. The largest age group was 13, with 99 contestants. Seventy-three spellers were return contestants: 56 two-time contestants, 14 three-time contestants, and three were participating in their fourth national Bee.

According to a report on the eve of the Bee in the Associated Press, there were three "consensus favorites" to win the competition, including Shourav Dasari (of Conroe, Texas and winner of the Houston area bee), Siyona Mishra (who finished 9th last year), and Tejas Muthusamy (a four-time Bee speller). Mishra and Muthusamy did advance to the final 15, Dasari placed 4th.

=== Day One and Day Two ===
The Bee began on the morning of Tuesday, May 30, 2017, when the contestants took their opening written test (the "first round"). On Wednesday May 31 there were two oral spelling rounds (the "second" and "third" round of competition), where a missed word results in elimination. After the first oral round ("Round 2"), 259 spellers of the original 291 remained (32 were eliminated). Halfway through round three, the field was reduced to 222 spellers, and at the end of round three, 188 spellers remained.

The results from the oral spelling rounds were then combined with the written test scores to determine the group of finalists to compete on Thursday, which could not exceed 50 spellers. Only 40 finalists were announced; it took 23 out of 30 points on the written test, plus an additional 6 points (3 points for correctly spelling in each of the two oral rounds), to become a finalist.

=== Day Three – Morning ===
The final day of the Bee began at 10am EDT on June 1, 2017, with the 40 finalists remaining, and was broadcast on ESPN2. After an afternoon break, the final spellers competed in the evening.

After Round 4 (the first round of day 3), 6 more spellers were eliminated, leaving 34 competitors. Twelve-spellers were eliminated in Round 5, leaving 22 (11 boys and 11 girls). Seventeen spellers survived Round 6. After two more spellers dropped in Round 7, the final 15 advanced to the evening finals.

The fifteen finalists were:

- Rohan Sachdev (Speller 27) – Cary, North Carolina
- Erin Howard (36) – Huntsville, Alabama
- Mira Dedhia (75) – Western Springs, Illinois
- Shrinidhi Gopal (114) – San Ramon, California
- Tejas Muthusamy (143) – Glen Allen, Virginia
- Sreeniketh Vogoti (167) – Saint Johns, Florida
- Saketh Sundar (187) – Elkridge, Maryland
- Alice Liu (191) – St. Louis, Missouri
- Raksheet Kota (200) – Katy, Texas
- Naysa Modi (210) – Monroe, Louisiana
- Rohan Rajeev (235) – Edmond, Oklahoma
- Shourav Dasari (254) – Spring, Texas
- Alex Iyer (259) – San Antonio, Texas
- Ananya Vinay (264) – Fresno, California
- Shruthika Padhy (278) – Cherry Hill, New Jersey

=== Day Three – Evening ===
The 15 finalists began the final rounds at 8:30pm EDT on June 1. Four spellers dropped in the first evening round (Round 8), and five in the next round, leaving six spellers. The final two spellers were Ananya Vinay, 12, of Fresno, California, and Rohan Rajeev, who continued to spell their words correctly for some time. After Rohan missed "marram", Ananya correctly spelled "gifblaar", and then spelled "marocain" for the win.

Third place went to Mira Dedhia, missing "ehretia", the first word in the Championship Rounds, and fourth place went to Shourav Dasari, who missed "Struldbrug".

=== Prizes ===
As in the prior year's bee, the first place prize was $40,000 (among other prizes), and second place was $30,000. Ananya also traveled to New York to appear on Live with Kelly and Ryan and Los Angeles to appear on Jimmy Kimmel Live!.

== New tiebreaker test ==
After three straight years where the Bee ended in a tie, the Bee's rules were amended to include a written tiebreaker test for those remaining on the last evening of the Bee. Those spellers were given a written test (at 6 p.m. on Thursday) with 12 words and 12 vocabulary questions. If either two or three spellers remained after 25 rounds, the highest score on the tiebreaker test would have decided the winner. If the tiebreaker test results were also a tie, only then would co-champions (which could be two or three spellers) be announced. The tiebreaker did not need to be used in this edition of the Scripps National Spelling Bee.

== Word list championship round ==
- panniculitis (Sachdev) (miss)
- strisciando (Howard)
- ascian (Dedhia)
- Purana (Gopal)
- xanthochroism (Muthusamy)
- clafouti, clafoutis (Vogoti) (miss)
- tules (Sundar) (miss)
- galanas (Liu) (miss)
- brachycerous (Kota)
- phthisiology (Modi)
- Quadragesima (Rajeev)
- concours (Dasari)
- velamentum (Iyer)
- verdaccio (Vinay)
- facies (Padhy)
- Klydonograph (Howard) (miss)
- Aubusson (Dedhia)
- mitis (Gopal) (miss)
- bumicky (Muthusamy)
- bouchee (Kota)
- marasmus (Modi) (miss)
- cattleya (Rajeev)
- oncochaeta (Dasari)
- savate (Iyer) (miss)
- acharnement (Vinay)
- quintain (Padhy) (miss)
- caroche (Dedhia)
- phaeism (Muthusamy)
- izzat (Kota)
- minaudière (Rajeev)
- pterygoideus (Dasari)
- apagoge (Vinay)
- euphroe (Dedhia)
- melainotype (Muthusamy)
- bautta (Kota)
- causse (Rajeev)
- aepyornis (Dasari)
- phthirophagous (Vinay)
- tohubohu (Dedhia)
- saussurite (Muthusamy) (miss)
- oedemerid (Kota) (miss)
- rinkafadda (Rajeev)
- Mogollon (Dasari)
- arribada (Vinay)
- khatun (Dedhia)
- fauxbourdon (Rajeev)
- Ubaid (Dasari)
- dhyana (Vinay)
- spiegeleisen (Dedhia)
- mollienisia (Rajeev)
- korrigan (Dasari)
- nuraghe (Vinay)
- phycoerythrin (Dedhia)
- ressentiment (Rajeev)
- Struldbrug (Dasari) (miss)
- Dasein (Vinay)
- ehretia (Dedhia) (miss)
- Egeria (Rajeev)
- cuivre (Vinay)
- Bandkeramik (Rajeev)
- gargouillade (Vinay)
- siddur (Rajeev)
- cavaquinho (Vinay)
- konohiki (Rajeev)
- tasajillo (Vinay)
- psophometer (Rajeev)
- aracari (Vinay)
- barasingha (Rajeev)
- konditorei (Vinay)
- voussoir (Rajeev)
- heiligenschein (Vinay)
- epirrhema (Rajeev)
- staatenbund (Vinay)
- chitarrino (Rajeev)
- pykrete (Vinay)
- koleroga (Rajeev)
- berghaan (Vinay)
- Juglar (Rajeev)
- gwyniad (Vinay)
- durchkomponiert (Rajeev)
- sceloporus (Vinay)
- Brabançon (Rajeev)
- zeaxanthin (Vinay)
- rastaquouère, rastacouère (Rajeev)
- Boyg (Vinay)
- emphyteusis (Rajeev)
- cecidomyia (Vinay)
- Naassene (Rajeev)
- gesith (Vinay)
- potichimanie (Rajeev)
- Tchefuncte (Vinay)
- cheiropompholyx (Rajeev)
- wayzgoose (Vinay)
- poulaine (Rajeev)
- Hypapante (Vinay)
- marram (Rajeev) (miss)
- gifblaar (Vinay)
- marocain (Vinay)
