= 88th Scripps National Spelling Bee =

Spelling bee held in the United States in 2015

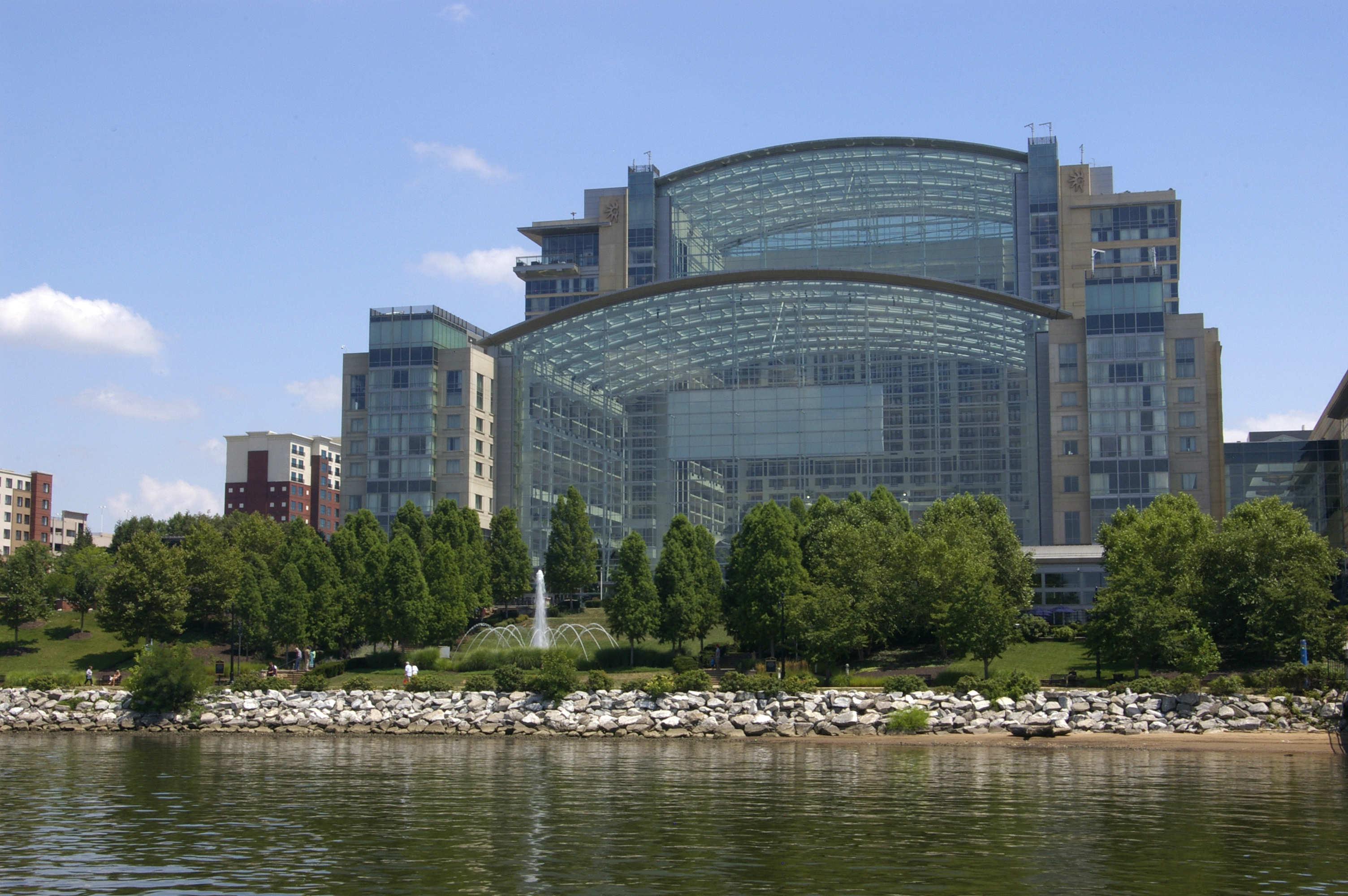
- Date: May 24–28, 2015
- Location: Gaylord National Resort & Convention Center, National Harbor, Maryland
- Winner: Co-winners: Gokul Venkatachalam; Vanya Shivashankar (*Olathe, Kansas (Shivashankar) at time of win)
- Sponsor: St. Louis Post-Dispatch (Venkatachalam); The Olathe News (Shivashankar)
- Winning word: nunatak (Venkatachalam); Scherenschnitte (Shivashankar)
- No. of contestants: 283
- Pronouncer: Jacques Bailly

The 88th Scripps National Spelling Bee was held at the Gaylord National Resort & Convention Center in National Harbor, Maryland from May 24–28, 2015. Students competed for a prize valued at $38,600 coming from various companies.

== Competition ==
For the second year in a row the outcome was a tie, with Gokul Venkatachalam and Vanya Shivashankar ending up as co-winners once the Bee's dictionary was emptied. Vanya was the first sibling of a previous winner to win; her sister Kavya won in 2009. Vanya Shivashankar from Olathe, Kansas (in her fifth appearance at the Bee) and Gokul Venkatachalam from Chesterfield, Missouri (who finished third the prior year) won the bee, making a total of thirteenth of the past seventeen bees up to and including it to have had an Indian-American champion. Other finalists included Cole Shafer-Ray, Snehaa Ganesh Kumar, Siddharth Krishnakumar, Dev Jaiswal, Tejas Muthusamy, Paul Keaton, Sylvie Lamontagne, and Siyona Mishra.

There were 283 spellers this year. 285 were scheduled to participate (2 did not attend), 146 girls and 139 boys, ranging from age 9 to 15. 67% attended public schools. Forty-nine spellers from the original field made it to the final day of competition.

== Word list championship round ==
- bouillabaisse
- cerastes - misspelled by Sylvie Lamontagne (T-9th)
- haček - misspelled by Siyona Mishra (T-9th)
- cytopoiesis
- crannog
- bacchius
- cocozelle
- samadhi
- Albumblatt
- billiken
- Hippocrene
- backfisch
- poikilitic - misspelled by Paul Keaton (T-7th)
- gnathostome
- población
- commissurotomy
- réclame
- tartarean - misspelled by Tejas Muthusamy (T-7th)
- oflag - misspelled by Snehaa Ganesh Kumar (T-4th)
- bayadere
- iridocyclitis - misspelled by Dev Jaiswal (T-4th)
- Canossa
- tortillon
- minhag - misspelled by Siddharth Krishnakumar (T-4th)
- cibarial
- zygoneure
- acritarch - misspelled by Cole Shafer-Ray (3rd)
- bouquetière
- caudillismo
- thamakau
- scytale
- tantième
- cypseline
- urgrund
- filicite
- myrmotherine
- sprachgefühl
- zimocca
- nixtamal
- hippocrepiform
- paroemiology
- scacchite
- pipsissewa
- Bruxellois
- pyrrhuloxia
- scherenschnitte - championship word for Vanya Shivashankar (T-1st)
- nunatak - championship word for Gokul Venkatachalam (T-1st)
