= 92nd Scripps National Spelling Bee =

Spelling bee held in the United States in 2019

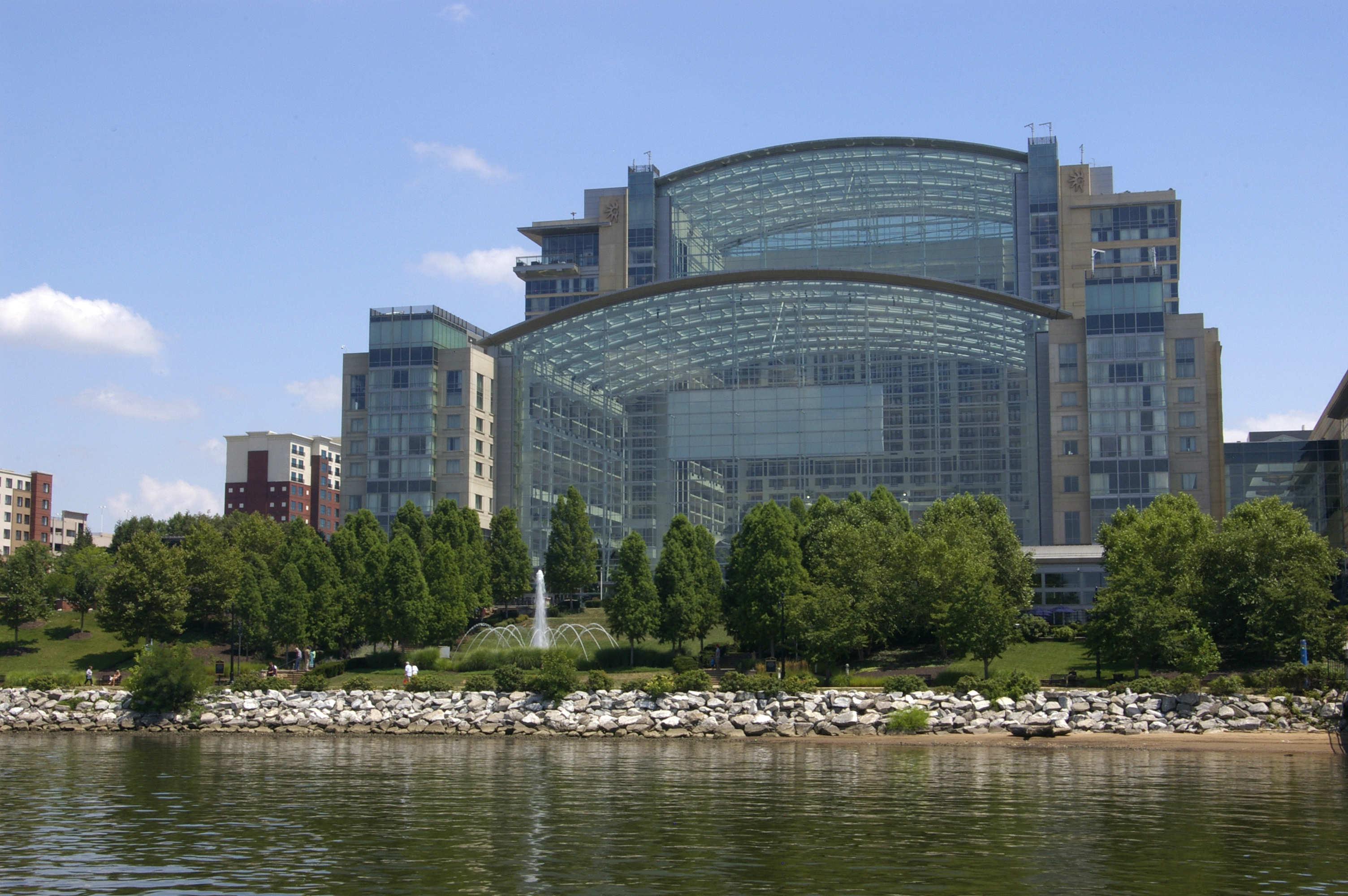
- The Gaylord National Resort & Convention Center in National Harbor, Maryland, hosted the Scripps National Spelling Bee.
- Date: May 27–30, 2019
- Location: Gaylord National Resort & Convention Center, National Harbor, Maryland
- Winner: Eight co-winners: Rishik Gandhasri; Erin Howard; Abhijay Kodali; Shruthika Padhy; Rohan Raja; Christopher Serrao; Sohum Sukhatankar; Saketh Sundar; ( 12 (Kodali); 13 (Gandhasri, Padhy, Raja, Serrao, Sukhatankar, and Sundar); 14 (Howard); at time of win)
- Winning word: aiguillette (Padhy); auslaut (Gandhasri); bougainvillea (Sundar); cernuous (Serrao); erysipelas (Howard); odylic (Raja); palama (Kodali); pendeloque (Sukhatankar)
- No. of contestants: 562
- Pronouncer: Jacques Bailly and Brian Sietsema

The 92nd Scripps National Spelling Bee was held at the Gaylord National Resort & Convention Center in National Harbor, Maryland, from May 27 to 30, 2019. The finals were held on May 30, 2019, and televised on ESPN2 and ESPN. It featured 562 total contestants and was won by eight co-champions who had lasted through twenty rounds.

== Field ==
There were 562 contestants in the 92nd competition, a sizeable jump over the 515 who competed in the previous year. Eleven spellers who made the prime-time finals last year were back. 270 spellers won regional bees, and about 292 applied through the RSVBee program. There were nine sets of twins in the competition. 162 spellers were return contestants. The youngest speller, Faizan Zaki (future champion of the 2025 bee), was 7, and the oldest spellers were 15.

== Competition ==
Spellers took a preliminary written test (Round One) on Monday, May 27. On-stage spelling began on Tuesday May 28, 2019. After one round of oral spelling (Round Two), 44 spellers were eliminated (of which 25 were RSVBee entrants), leaving 518 spellers. Speller Max Greenspan of Arizona was reinstated in the first oral round after being prematurely rung off for spelling "mot juste" as "mot just"; It was determined that it was not clear that he had finished spelling. This ambiguity may have been caused by a rule that states that spellers cannot be eliminated for failing to repeat the word once they are finished spelling; Greenspan's long pause led the judges to believe that he had done so.

The field was reduced to 9 at the end of the second oral spelling round on Wednesday May 29. Late in the day, a group of 50 finalists was announced, which consists of spellers who spelled both of their words on stage correctly, and were the top scorers on the written test. Spellers had to get 30 out of 36 on the written test to make the finals this year. Three of the finalists got 35: Simone Kaplan, Shruthika Padhy, and Sohum Sukhatankar.

The finals began at 10am EDT on Thursday May 30. After the first morning round, 10 spellers were eliminated, leaving 40. Six more were eliminated in the next round, leaving 34. Five and four left in the next two rounds (down to 25). The fifth round of the day proved more harsh when 8 of the first 16 spellers failed to advance. The morning session was supposed to end at 2pm, but ran over 90 minutes, until the field was reduced to 16. The final 16 included seven who reached the prime time finals last year, and two doing it for third year in a row.

The final rounds began on Thursday evening. After over three hours, the competition ended in an unprecedented eight-way tie, the winners being dubbed the "elite eight." Although the Bee's rules only anticipate up to a three-way tie, officials began planning for the contingency of more winners earlier in the day due to the performances in earlier rounds. On the other hand, the founder of the South Asian Spelling Bee suggested the Bee's finalist words simply were not hard enough. The eight-way tie resulted in organisers implementing time limits (1 hour, 55 minutes) and a shootout to break further ties. The shootout winner is determined by the number of words correctly spelled in the 1 minute, 30 second round. However, it is still possible to have a tie after the shootout, after which the winner would be determined by percentage of correctly spelled words in the shootout. An unbroken tie is still possible if the percentage of correct answers is the same between tied players.

| Last word | Name | Sponsor | Sponsor's location |
|---|---|---|---|
| auslaut | Rishik Gandhasri | Bay Area Regional Spelling Bee | San Jose, California |
| erysipelas | Erin Howard | Adventure Travel | Huntsville, Alabama |
| bougainvillea | Saketh Sundar | Howard County Library | Clarksville, Maryland |
| aiguillette | Shruthika Padhy | Rosa International Middle School | Cherry Hill, New Jersey |
| pendeloque | Sohum Sukhatankar | Dallas Sports Commission | Dallas, Texas |
| palama | Abhijay Kodali | Dallas Sports Commission | Flower Mound, Texas |
| cernuous | Christopher Serrao | Discover Lehigh Valley | Whitehouse Station, New Jersey |
| odylic | Rohan Raja | Dallas Sports Commission | Irving, Texas |

== Rule changes ==
The first place prize was raised from $40,000 (which it had been since 2016) to $50,000 this year. In the event of a tie, the two winners would split the first and second place ($25,000) awards ($37,500 each). All 8 winners received the full prize, $50,000, however.

A few weeks before the competition, spelling bee organizers declared that the tiebreaker test, established in 2017 to declare a champion in the case of all 25 championship round words being exhausted, would no longer be administered, due to the pressure and difficulty it imposes upon the spellers.

This was the second year that spellers could qualify through the RSVBee program if their school is part of the National Spelling Bee Program and the speller has won a school or community bee, even if they have not won a regional bee. RSVBee participants do not have a sponsor, and have to pay a $1,500 entry fee plus their own travel, lodging, and expenses, and another $600 if they do not stay at the site hotel. The program raised concerns this year that some spellers were getting in merely because they are able to pay their way. Some wild-card spellers were eliminated in the first two oral rounds on simple words (compared to the normal level at the national bee): tendon, vestibule, allocation, and gyro. Seventeen RSVBee entrants were 9 or younger, and none made it to the finals.

== Word list championship round ==
- frailejón
- Stakhanovite
- jabiru
- Tophet
- alloeostropha
- scuppaug
- kairos
- psithyrus
- marmennill
- holishkes
- emberizine
- quarrion
- alferez
- apophysitis
- kagura
- campylobacter
- myctophid
- autotopagnosia
- cuirassier
- tinaja
- oeconomus
- paxiuba
- psoas
- Maillard
- haustellum
- concentus
- Borinqueño
- Golconda
- terrones
- atabaque
- bozzetto
- flaser
- bottarga
- athyreosis
- pallone
- lobbygow
- doronicum
- chaebol
- hieracium
- omphacite
- fucus
- paulopost
- cullis
- fonctionnaire
- bassanello
- sobole
- coryphée
- leister
- meerschaum
- jalap
- psammosere
- murrelet
- Beira
- Chama
- thymele
- trachyte
- Heideggerian
- Macclesfield
- calathos
- chelydroid
- huanglongbing
- jindyworobak
- passepied
- surculose
- ischiocerite
- bresaola
- chocalho, chucalho
- Catilinarian
- grasseyement
- vintem
- Nyaya
- manualiter
- zamacueca
- geeldikkop
- Rassenkreis
- karmadharaya
- allothimorph
- auftaktigkeit
- imbirussú
- Nibelung
- fravashi
- tettigoniid
- godet
- Cytherean
- taurokathapsia
- saucisson
- passacaglia
- caramoussal
- choumoellier
- tjaele
- Komondor
- vraic
- sphaeriid
- tathagata
- chrotta
- callejón
- Gaeltacht
- rhathymia
- tulisan
- Roskopf
- Moazagotl
- urfirnis
- aphesis
- jacqueminot
- Honiton
- murrain
- calembour
- makimono
- therblig
- paralipomena
- cestui
- Logudorese
- hochmoor
- anthocyanin
- deixis
- mondegreen
- limitrophe
- seitan
- badderlocks
- omphalopsychite
- chapon
- auslaut
- erysipelas
- bougainvillea
- aiguillette
- pendeloque
- palama
- cernuous
- odylic
