= 94th Scripps National Spelling Bee =

Spelling bee held in the United States in 2022

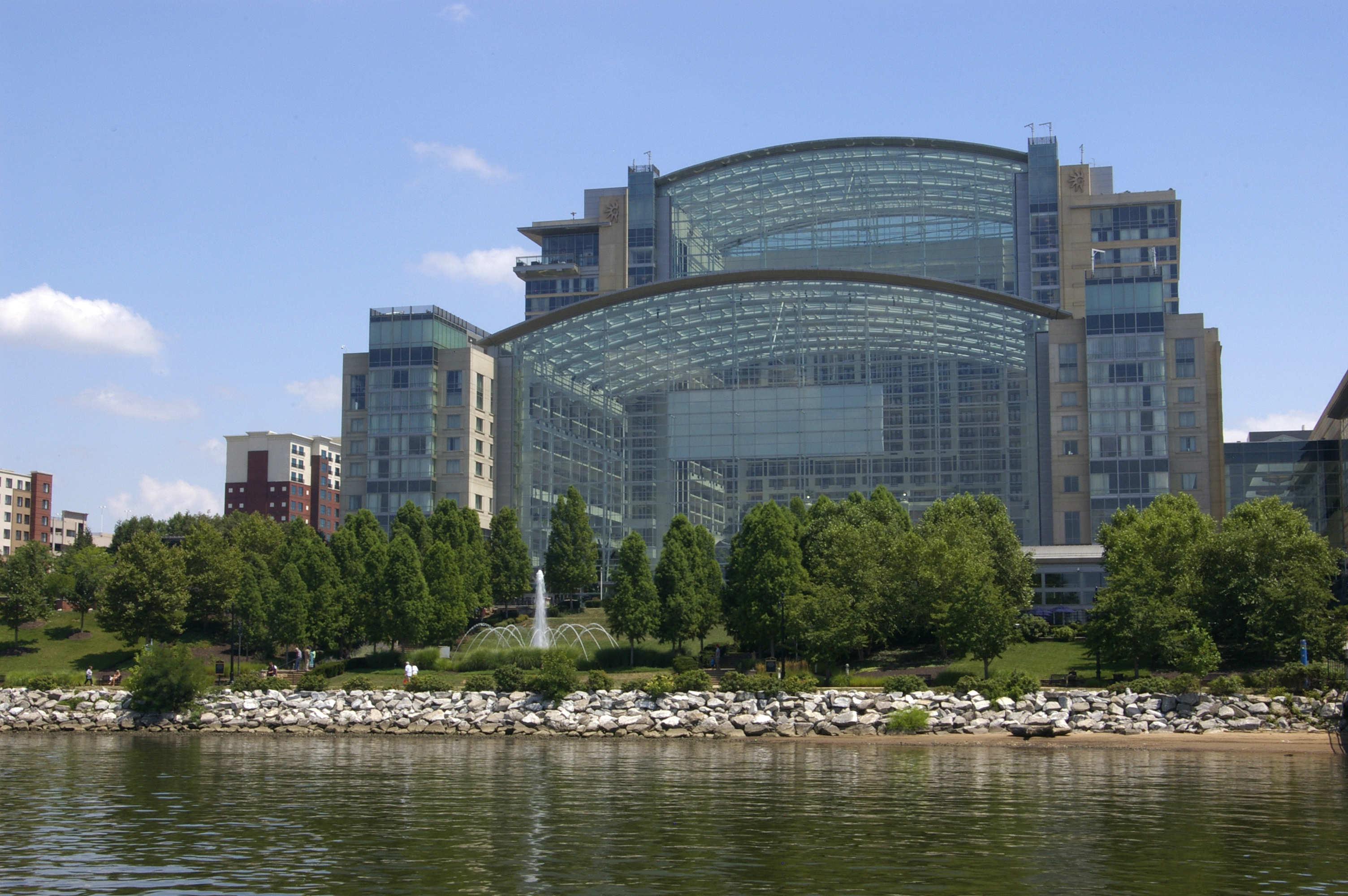
- The Gaylord National Resort & Convention Center in National Harbor, Maryland, hosted the Scripps National Spelling Bee.
- Date: May 30–June 2, 2022
- Location: Gaylord National Resort & Convention Center (National Harbor, Maryland)
- Winner: Harini Logan (14 at time of win)
- Sponsor: The Brauntex Performing Arts Theatre Association
- Sponsor location: San Antonio, Texas
- Winning word: moorhen (spell–off)
- No. of contestants: 234
- Pronouncer: Jacques Bailly and Brian Sietsema

The 94th Scripps National Spelling Bee was a spelling bee that was held at Gaylord National Resort & Convention Center in National Harbor, Maryland. The finals were held on June 2, 2022, and televised on Ion Television and Bounce TV, marking its debut on the organiser-owned Scripps Television. The winner of the bee was Harini Logan, an 8th–grade girl from San Antonio, Texas, who won with 21 words spelled correctly during the Bee's first spell-off round.

== Field ==
There were 234 contestants in the field for the 2022 edition of the spelling bee, which was a modest increase over 209 spellers that competed in the year before. This year marked a return to normalcy for the bee after the past two years were affected by the COVID-19 pandemic. The youngest speller in the bee was 7–year old Matthew Yi, and the most experienced speller was 13–year old Akash Vukoti. 12 spellers from ages 11 to 14 made the final round, which was held on June 2, 2022.

== Competition ==
Actor LeVar Burton hosted the spelling bee on Scripps-owned Ion Television and Bounce TV, which broadcast every day of the event.

The spelling bee was broken up into four segments this year: preliminaries, quarterfinals, semifinals, and finals. The newly introduced word meaning competition returned for the second time. After the preliminary round, the field was already reduced from 234 to 88 spellers.

Both the quarterfinals and semifinals took place on June 1, 2022. 40 more spellers were eliminated in the quarterfinals, leaving the field at 48 spellers. The word meaning round caused many contenders to be eliminated in this round. A controversial monument came in the semifinal round when speller Surya Kapu misspelled the word leucovorin, but was reinstated after an appeal saying that he was not given enough information about a root in the word. 12 spellers remained after the semifinals.

The finals began on Thursday night at 8pm and lasted for over 3 hours. The third–to–last speller was eliminated in Round 11, leaving 12–year old Vikram Raju and 14–year old Harini Logan to compete for the title. Logan had a chance to win the bee in Round 16 after Raju misspelt the word caul, but Logan was unable to correctly spell the word drimys for the championship. The two remaining competitors lasted through the entire championship word list after 18 rounds, meaning the tiebreaker round implemented after the 2019 finish was used for the first time. Competitors have 1:30 to spell as many words as they could from the tiebreaker list. Logan spelled 21 words correctly to Raju's 15 in the spell–off round, making Logan the 2022 champion.

== Word list championship round ==
- cypsela
- pogge
- cytisine
- ajivika
- sedile
- nerine
- colane
- Helxine
- colleter
- Clitocybe
- Pachytylus
- mispel
- connaraceous
- remoulade (word meaning)
- dreadnought (word meaning)
- rattan (word meaning)
- bastille (word meaning)
- cinctured (word meaning)
- encomium (word meaning)
- lissome (word meaning)
- pullulation (word meaning)
- dasypodid
- martinete
- phenocoll
- tyrolienne
- congener
- Mercator
- tauromachian
- opisometer
- ditalini
- coracidium
- charadriiform
- Senijextee
- Powys
- caul
- sereh
- drimys
- Otukian
- myricetin
- pyrrolidone
- scyllarian

== Word list spell-off round ==
- spealbone
- phreatophyte
- gaydiang
- parison
- excimer
- toquilla
- glochis
- epaulement
- chara
- maieutic
- chalicothere
- teosinte
- siserary
- akori
- bouchal
- saccharose
- talisay
- vesicate
- semmit
- chorepiscopus
- kniphofia
- hontish
- malbrouck
- ornithorhynchus
- nandubay
- moorhen

== See also ==
- List of Scripps National Spelling Bee champions
