= 96th Scripps National Spelling Bee =

2024 American spelling bee

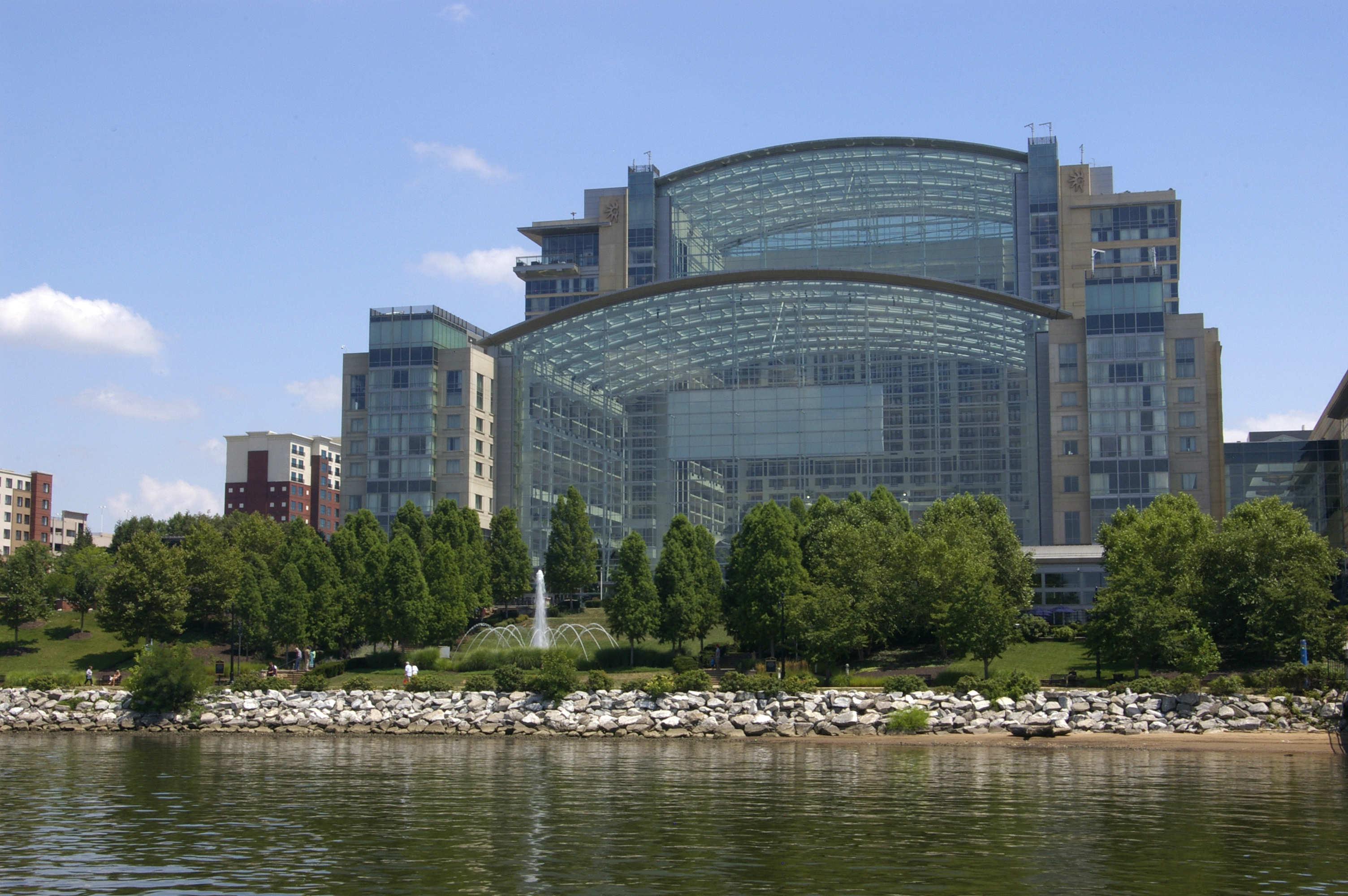
- The Gaylord National Resort & Convention Center in National Harbor, Maryland, hosted the Scripps National Spelling Bee.
- Date: May 26-30, 2024
- Location: Gaylord National Resort & Convention Center, National Harbor, Maryland
- Winner: Bruhat Soma (12 at time of win)
- Sponsor: Rays Baseball Foundation and Rowdies Soccer Fund
- Sponsor location: St. Petersburg, Florida
- Winning word: abseil (spell-off)
- Pronouncer: Jacques Bailly and Brian Sietsema

The 96th Scripps National Spelling Bee was a spelling bee competition that was held at Gaylord National Resort & Convention Center in National Harbor, Maryland.

The 2024 bee welcomed 245 spellers from the United States and its territories, Canada, Ghana, and The Bahamas. After competing in preliminary, quarterfinal and semi-final rounds on May 28, and May 29, 2024, the field of competition narrowed to 8 finalists who competed on the night of May 30, 2024.

== Competition ==
The bee aired on Scripps-owned networks ION and Bounce TV.

The competition featured preliminary, quarterfinal, semifinal, and final rounds. The show reached the time limit, leading to the implementation of the "spell-off" shootout. Bruhat Soma defeated Faizan Zaki in the shootout, 22-20, winning the cash prize of $50,000.

== Field ==
The Scripps National Spelling Bee starts off with regional or school spelling bees for grades 8 and under. More than 240 spellers competed in the 2024 national bee.

- Bruhat Soma, 12, from Florida (champion) [winning word: abseil]
- Faizan Zaki, 12, from Texas (2nd place)
- Ananya Rao Prassanna, 13, from North Carolina
- YY Liang, 12, from New York
- Adithi Muthukumar, 13, from Colorado
- Shrey Parikh, 12, from California
- Rishabh Saha, 14, from California
- Kirsten Tiffany Santos, 13, from Texas

== Word list championship round ==
- desmotrope
- eustachian
- febrifuge
- habitude
- immanent
- morbilliform
- oosorption
- plagiotropic
- jurisprudential (word meaning)
- tesseract (word meaning)
- sine qua non (word meaning)
- velocipede (word meaning)
- liminal (word meaning)
- modus operandi (word meaning)
- grunion
- peccant
- indumentum
- saltigrade
- sphenography
- apophasis
- gobiesocid
- molysite
- dehnstufe
- martaban
- avahi
- Jumano
- Lillooet
- Okvik
- tennesi
- daena
- kanin
- Hoofddorp
- murrina
- nicuri

== Spell-off championship round ==
- brouette
- adelantado
- hyporcheme
- bisellium
- mycteric
- endecha
- sericin
- nyctalopia
- ascham
- wenzel
- cebell
- heautophany
- kwazoku
- panetière
- sagaie
- nachschläge
- exorhason
- porphyrio
- giclée
- ashwagandha
- puszta
- asarotum
- scintillante
- myrabalanus
- sciniph
- voussoir
- caixinha
- ramoneur
- aposiopesis
- abseil

== See also ==
- List of Scripps National Spelling Bee champions
