= 91st Scripps National Spelling Bee =

Spelling bee held in the United States in 2018

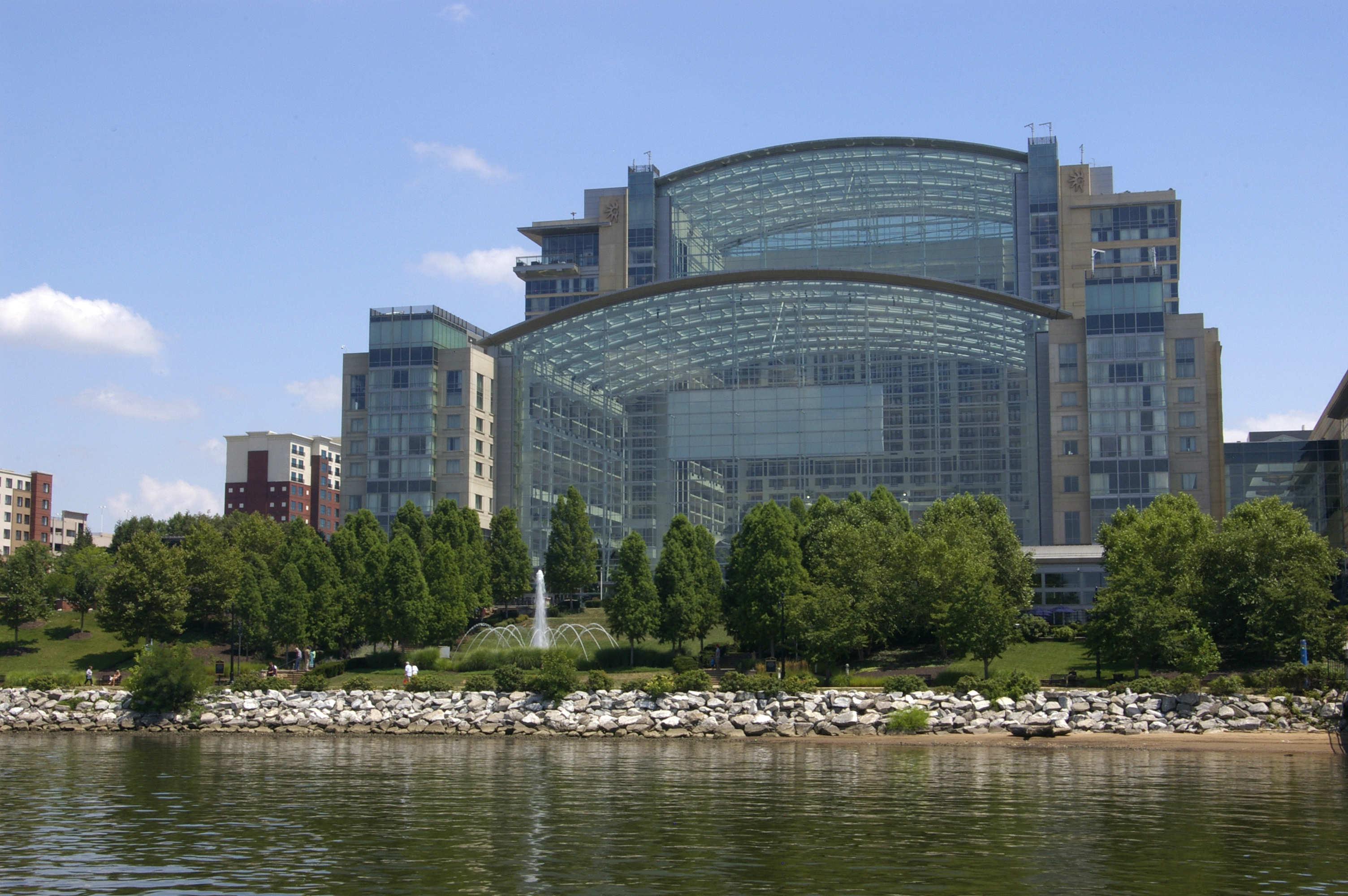
- Date: May 29–31, 2018
- Location: Gaylord National Resort & Convention Center, National Harbor, Maryland
- Winner: Karthik Nemmani (14 at time of win)
- Sponsor: RSVBee (wild card)
- Winning word: koinonia
- No. of contestants: 515
- Pronouncer: Jacques Bailly and Brian Sietsema

The 91st Scripps National Spelling Bee was held at the Gaylord National Resort & Convention Center in National Harbor, Maryland (its eighth year at this location) from May 29 to 31, 2018. The winner was 14-year-old Karthik Nemmani, an eighth grader from McKinney, Texas, who correctly spelled "koinonia" for the win. Due to a rule change in how spellers can make it to the Bee, the bee's total field of 515 spellers was a large increase over prior years.

== Field ==
519 spellers qualified for the Bee, and 515 ultimately showed up for the competition (early news reports stated 516 and were later adjusted). The field included 239 girls (46%) and 277 boys (54%) between the ages of 8 and 15. The spellers came from all 50 U.S. states, the District of Columbia, other U.S. territories and Department of Defense schools, and eight other countries, including the Bahamas, Canada, Ghana, Italy, Jamaica, Japan, South Korea, and the United Kingdom; contenders from Italy and the United Kingdom were American citizens living in those countries, and not drawn from the general populations. Over 150 spellers were of Indian descent, including the son of Balu Natarajan, the 1985 winner and first Indian-American winner.

== Competition ==
The spelling competition began on Tuesday May 29 with written spelling and vocabulary tests, this is the main way to get to the finals. The rest of day one consisted of one oral round of spelling, designated round two, with words drawn from a circulated list of 600. 452 spellers spelled their word correctly and advanced to day two.

On Wednesday, spellers were given words they had not previously been given in one more round of oral spelling, round three. 321 spellers remained at the conclusion of round three — still more than had ever participated in a national Bee. Speller 230, Reagan Remmers of Missoula, Montana, was reinstated after spelling "balaclava" as "Balaklava", which was determined to be a correct homonym spelling, since she had not requested a definition. This was only the fifth time in the past 20 years that a speller has returned after a misspelling. Since the bee now included three days of spelling, pronouncer Jacques Bailly shared duties with associate pronouncer Brian Sietsema on day two to help preserve his voice. This was the first time Sietsema had been called upon to pronounce, despite being the associate pronouncer for the past 16 years.

At the end of day two, applying the results of the written test, a field of 41 finalists was announced, the cutoff being 28 out of a possible 36 points. The finalists included 16 wild-card entrants and all of the consensus favorites: Shruthika Padhy, Jashun Paluru, Sravanth Malla, Naysa Modi, Sohum Sukhatankar, and Navneeth Murali.

The morning rounds of day three reduced the field to 16 finalists, which then competed in the evening finals. Karthik Nemmani, a 14-year-old from McKinney, Texas won the bee after he correctly spelled the word "koinonia". 12-year-old Naysa Modi, a fourth-time speller from Frisco, Texas, placed second, falling on the word "Bewusstseinslage". The two finalists were both from the Dallas area; Nemmani was a wild-card entrant under this year's new rules, after losing his county spelling bee to Modi. Third place went to Abhijay Kodali of Flower Mound, Texas (who missed "aalii"), who had tied for first place with Modi in the Dallas regional bee. Jashun Paluru of West Lafayette, Indiana, placed fourth. Nemmani is the 14th consecutive Indian-American to win the Bee.

The entire competition was televised, with the first two days on ESPN3, the Thursday morning rounds on ESPN2, and the Thursday evening finals on ESPN. It was the 25th year of ESPN broadcasting the Bee.

== Rule change ==
Due to a new rule change this year, there were over 500 participants in the Bee, a large increase over the previous record of 293 set in 2009.

To accommodate the larger field, oral spelling rounds occurred over all three days of the competition, instead of just two. In recent years, spellers had the day off once they completed the written tests on day one, but this year they spelled one word on stage on the first day of competition, and remaining spellers received a second word on day two.

Under a new rule, "wild card" entries were granted to spellers who won a school-level bee but did not win a regional competition. Called the "RSVBee" program, it was reportedly created to account for the variations in competition quality in different regions. Though there are about 275 regional bees, about one-quarter of the total 11 million spellers come from only eight regions. Priority consideration for a wild-card applicant goes to spellers who have already made a prior national bee, followed by older spellers reaching their eligibility limit. Since wild-card entries do not have a regional sponsor, they have to pay a $750 entry fee as well their own travel, food, and lodging. That made it unclear how many people would apply when the rule change was announced in December 2017, and Bee officials originally stated that up to 225 RSVBee participants would be allowed. It turned out that the opportunity to attend the National Spelling Bee was a sufficient draw for spellers, as by April 2018, it was noted that in addition to 278 regional winners, 241 RSVBee spellers would also attend.

The rule change may also be related to cost cutting in the newspaper industry. Though there are now well over 200 regional bees across the United States (and a few abroad), some regional bee sponsors (which traditionally have been newspapers) may decide to drop their sponsorship, causing regional bee cancellations if a new sponsor cannot be found. If that happens, local spellers will have no path to the National Bee.

855 spellers applied for the RSVBee program this year, and 241 were approved. 39 were previous National Bee participants.

== Word list championship round ==
- kanone
- arrhostia
- carmagnole
- soubresaut
- pavillon
- genestrole
- vinhatico
- chaitya
- Praxitelean
- paillasson
- ispaghul
- cabalassou
- telyn
- loratadine
- jagüey
- ceinture
- gnomonics
- binnacle
- funest
- amaranthine
- calando
- rouleau
- lophophytosis
- shamir
- pseudepigrapha
- perduellion
- fourrier
- lanugo
- propylaeum
- cointise
- videlicet
- passus
- jacana
- ooporphyrin
- Malmaison
- cento
- ochronosis
- grognard
- Mnemosyne
- nastaliq
- amadelphous
- succiniferous
- ankyloglossia
- whyos
- ecchymosis
- gelinotte
- lochetic
- cendre
- Lakenvelder
- ephyra
- pareidolia
- miarolitic
- Bundestag
- philonium
- forçat
- condottiere
- aalii
- Bewusstseinslage
- haecceitas
- koinonia
