= Sohum Sukhatankar =

2019 Scripps National Spelling Bee champion

- Born: India
- Education: St. Mark's School of Texas; Harvard University
- Occupations: Student; author
- Known for: Co-champion of the 92nd Scripps National Spelling Bee (2019)
- Notable work: Exploring Endangered Languages (2023)

Sohum Sukhatankar is an Indian-American spelling bee contestant known for winning the 92nd Scripps National Spelling Bee that is known for having eight champions, a previously unprecedented number.

== Biography ==
Sohum is a student from Dallas, Texas. During the time he won the 2019 spelling bee, he studied in the St. Mark's School of Texas. In 2017, he won the Dallas regionals with the word "decamerous" and placed 23rd in the nationals. In 2018, Sohum won the South Asian Spelling Bee with the word "Dasyuridae", doing so at his first appearance there.

In 2019, Sohum returned to the national finals. After 20 rounds of competition, he, along with seven other spellers (Rishik Gandhasri, Erin Howard, Saketh Sundar, Shruthika Padhy, Abhijay Kodali, Christopher Serrao, and Rohan Raja) took the final crown as the champion of the year. Sohum's winning word was "pendeloque".

In 2023, Sohum wrote and published a book, Exploring Endangered Languages, about endangered languages in northeast India. He is currently studying mathematics, statistics, and computer science at Harvard University.
