= 1st Scripps National Spelling Bee =

Spelling bee held in the United States in 1925

1st National Spelling Bee
- Date: June 17, 1925
- Location: National Museum, Washington, D.C.
- Winner: Frank Neuhauser (11 at time of win)
- Sponsor: The Courier-Journal
- Sponsor location: Louisville, Kentucky
- No. of contestants: 9
- Pronouncer: George S. Wills

The 1st National Spelling Bee was held in Washington, D.C., on June 17, 1925, sponsored by the Louisville Courier-Journal. Scripps-Howard did not sponsor the Bee until 1941.

== Competition ==
Nine finalists (six girls and three boys) competed in Washington, where they met President Calvin Coolidge before the competition. After a 90-minute competition, the winner was 11-year-old Frank Neuhauser of Kentucky who correctly spelled gladiolus, a flower he had raised as a boy. He won $500 in gold pieces for placing first, and Louisville held a parade in his honor.

Coming in second place was 11-year-old Edna Stover of Trenton, New Jersey, winning $250, who spelled gladiolus with a "y" instead of an "i". Third place went to 12-year-old Helen Fischer of Akron, Ohio ($150) who missed "moribund", and fourth prize went to 13-year-old Mary Daniel of Hartford, Connecticut ($100) who missed "valuing".

The first to fall in the competition of nine was Almeda Pennington on "skittish" (9th place), followed by Mary Coddens ("cosmos") (8th place), Loren Mackey ("propeller") (7th place), Patrick Kelly ("blackguard") (6th place), and Dorothy Karrick ("statistician") (5th place).

The nine contestants in the first bee were: Dorothy Karrick (Detroit), Helen Fischer (Akron, Ohio), Edna Stover (Trenton, New Jersey), Patrick Keily (New Haven, Connecticut), Lorin Mackey (Oklahoma), Frank Neuhauser (Kentucky), Almeda Pennington (Houston, Texas), Mary Daniel (Hartford, Connecticut), and Mary Coddens (South Bend, Indiana).

Dr. George S. Wills served as pronouncer.
