= 51st Scripps National Spelling Bee =

Spelling bee held in the United States in 1978

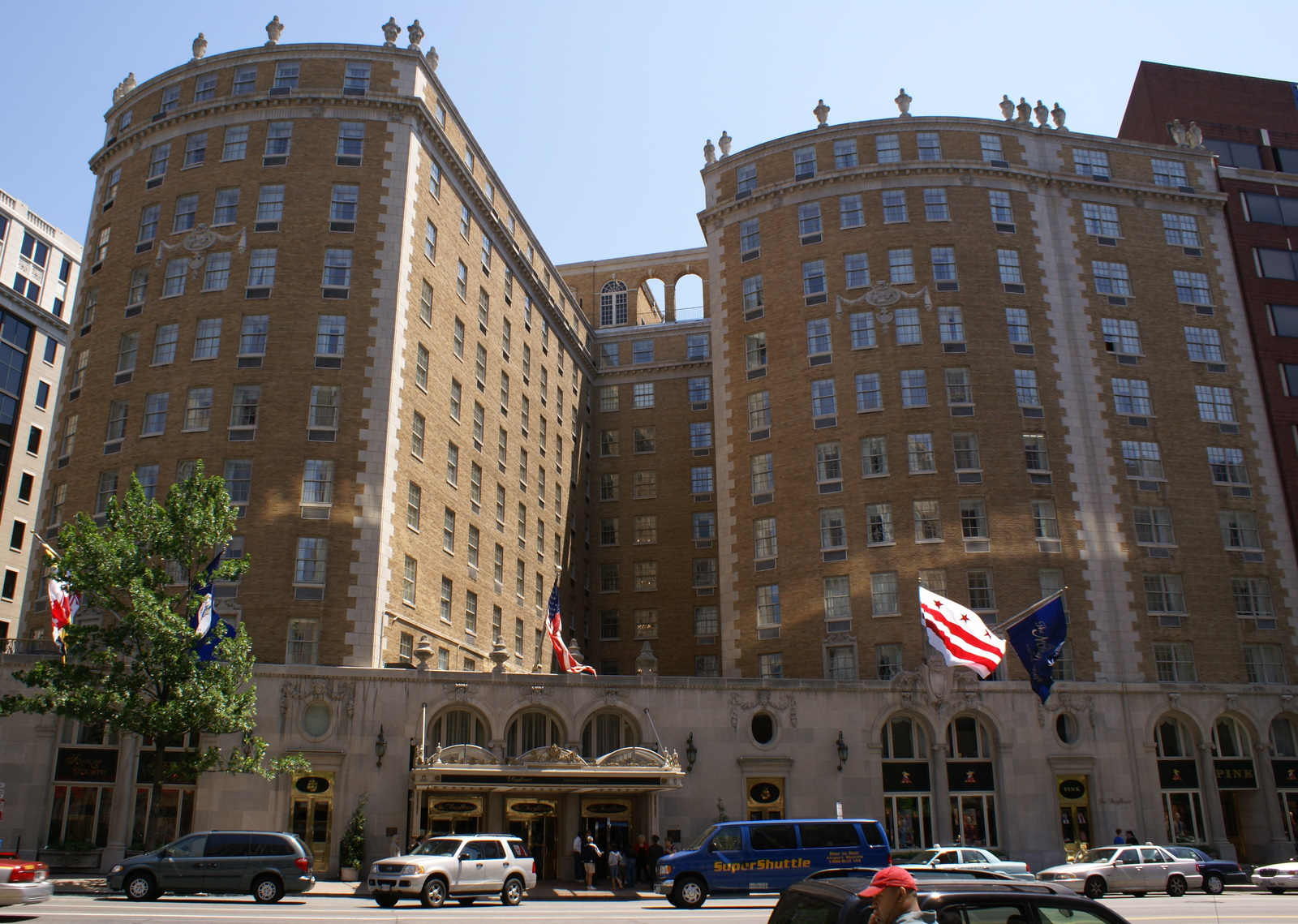
- The Mayflower Hotel, site of the 51st National Spelling Bee
- Date: June 7–8, 1978
- Location: The Mayflower Hotel in Washington, D.C.
- Winner: Peg McCarthy (13 at time of win)
- Sponsor: The Topeka Capital-Journal
- Sponsor location: Topeka, Kansas
- Winning word: deification
- No. of contestants: 106
- Pronouncer: Richard R. Baker

The 51st Scripps National Spelling Bee was held in Washington, D.C. at the Mayflower Hotel on June 7–8, 1978, sponsored by the E.W. Scripps Company.

The winner was 13-year-old Peg McCarthy of Topeka, Kansas, on the word "deification". Second place went to 12-year old Lyn Sue Kahng of San Diego, California, who missed "crescive". Third place went to Julie Won of Mechanicsburg, Pennsylvania who missed "fecund". Won took 2nd place the next year, where Won lost on the word "virescence".

There were 106 spellers this year (another record as usual during this era), made up of 58 girls and 48 boys, from ages 10 to 14. The competition was whittled down to 76 spellers after three rounds, and 23 of them survived into the finals.

McCarthy was the third winner from Kansas, following Jolitta Schlehuber in the 1958 bee and Robert Walters in the 1968 bee.

Richard R. Baker served as pronouncer.
