= 82nd Scripps National Spelling Bee =

2009 spelling competition

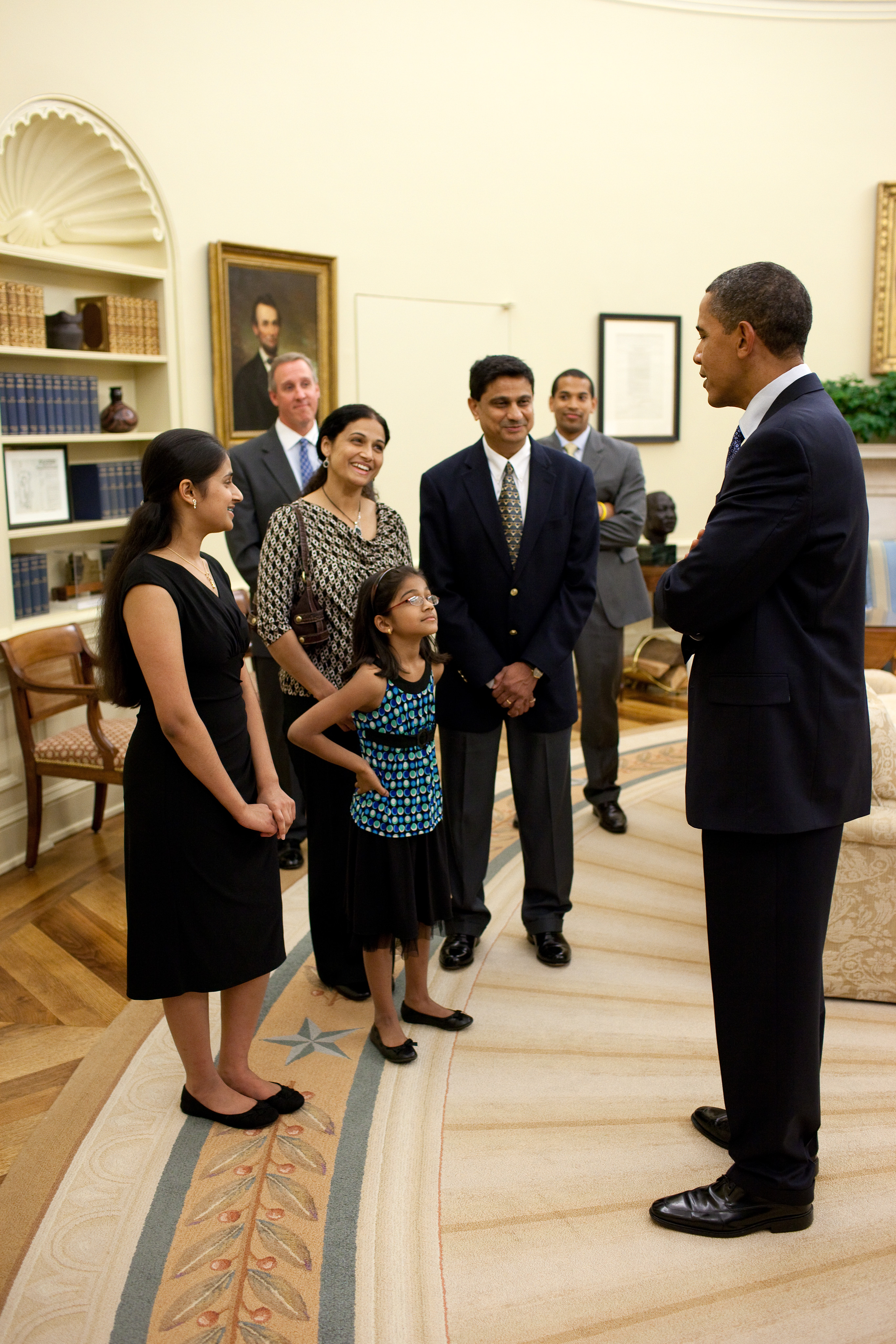
- President Barack Obama greets Kavya Shivashankar, left, the 2009 Scripps Spelling Bee winner, and her family in the Oval Office, June 3, 2010.
- Date: May 26–29, 2009
- Location: Grand Hyatt Washington, Washington, D.C.
- Winner: Kavya Shivashankar (13 at time of win)
- Sponsor: The Olathe News
- Sponsor location: Olathe, Kansas
- Winning word: Laodicean
- No. of contestants: 293
- Pronouncer: Jacques Bailly

The 82nd Scripps National Spelling Bee took place between May 26–28, 2009 in Washington, D.C.

== Competition ==
There were a record 293 spellers this year (the all-time record until the Bee's rules greatly expanded the field in 2018). 41 spellers made it to the final day of competition on Thursday.

The winner was Kavya Shivashankar. Her winning word was Laodicean. She was sponsored by The Olathe News. She won $35,000 in cash and more than $5,000 in prizes. The runners-up were Aishwarya Pastapur, who misspelled menhir, and Tim Ruiter, who misspelled Maecenas. This was Kavya's fourth appearance in the Scripps National Spelling Bee. Six of the top ten spellers, including the winner, were Indo-American.

The standings were as follows:

- 1. Kavya Shivashankar of Olathe, Kansas.
- 2. (tie) Tim A. Ruiter of Centreville, Virginia.
- 2. (tie) Aishwarya Eshwar Pastapur of Springfield, Illinois.
- 4. Kyle M. Mou of Peoria, Illinois.
- 5. (tie) Anamika Veeramani of North Royalton, Ohio
- 5. (tie) Kennyi Kwaku Aouad of Terre Haute, Indiana.
- 5. (tie) Ramya Auroprem of San Jose, California.
- 8. (tie) Neetu Chandak of Seneca Falls, New York.
- 8. (tie) Sidharth Chand of Bloomfield Hills, Michigan.
- 8. (tie) Serena Skye Laine-Lobsinger of West Palm Beach, Florida.
- 11. Tussah Heera Adi of Las Vegas, Nevada.

== TV coverage ==
The Championship Finals aired live on ABC from 8:00 PM to shortly after 10:00 p.m. EDT and were hosted by Tom Bergeron.

== Word list championship round ==
- avalement
- omphaloskepsis
- pogonip
- deipnosophist
- scilicet
- hydrargyrum
- Reykjavík
- herniorrhaphy
- ophelimity
- Anasazi
- psittacosis
- geusioleptic
- conchyliated
- avoirdupois
- tagliatelle
- gyascutus
- blancmange
- apodyterium
- derriengue
- simnel
- passacaglia
- axolotl
- plaidoyer
- goombay
- hypallage
- baignoire
- arrhostia
- byssinosis
- iliopsoas
- oeillade
- xebec
- grisaille
- huisache
- Neufchâtel
- cretonne
- amarevole
- becquerel
- Caerphilly
- palatschinken
- ecossaise
- fackeltanz
- jacqueminot
- schizaffin
- wisent
- diacoele
- reredos
- antonomasia
- bouquiniste
- oriflamme
- guayabera
- isagoge
- sophrosyne
- menhir
- phoresy
- Maecenas
- Laodicean

== See also ==
- List of Scripps National Spelling Bee champions
