= 60th Scripps National Spelling Bee =

Spelling bee held in the United States in 1987

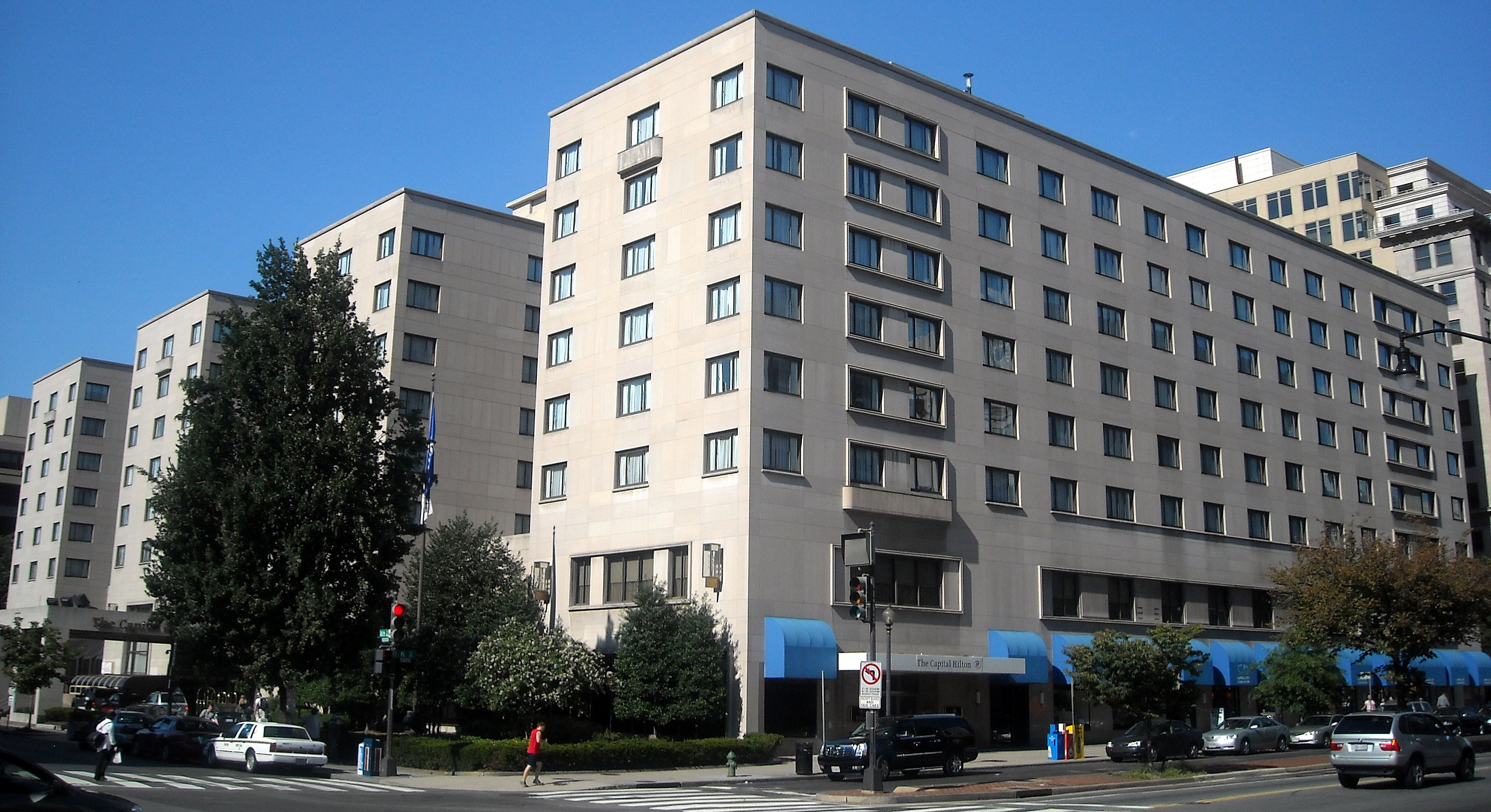
- The Capital Hilton, site of the 60th National Spelling Bee
- Date: May 27–28, 1987
- Location: The Capital Hilton in Washington, D.C.
- Winner: Stephanie Petit (13 at time of win)
- Sponsor: Pittsburgh Press
- Sponsor location: Pittsburgh, Pennsylvania
- Winning word: staphylococci
- No. of contestants: 185
- Pronouncer: Alex Cameron

The 60th Scripps National Spelling Bee was held in Washington, D.C. at the Capital Hilton on May 27–28, 1987, sponsored by the E.W. Scripps Company.

The winner was 13-year-old Stephanie Petit of Bethel Park, Pennsylvania, prevailing on the word "staphylococci". Second place went to 14-year-old Rachel Nussbaum of Ithaca, New York, who fell on "dyscalculia".

There were 185 spellers this year, 92 boys and 93 girls. Pennsylvania sent the most, with 15. Twenty-nine were appearing at their second bee, and five were there for a third visit. After the first day of competition, the field was reduced to 123 after four rounds of spelling. One hundred eight spellers fell in two rounds on the morning of day two, leaving 15 spellers at the lunch break; nine girls and six boys. A total of 877 words were used. Alex Cameron served as pronouncer.

The first place prize was $1,500 (and other non-cash prizes), the first increase in the prior $1,000 top award since 1956. Petit also appeared on The Tonight Show with Johnny Carson on June 10. Second place received $1,000, third got $750, fourth $500, fifth $400, sixth $300, 7th through 10th received $200, and the remaining spellers each received $50.

An additional change this year was that the opening practice round was eliminated, due to the growing number of spellers.
