= 41st Scripps National Spelling Bee =

Spelling bee held in the United States in 1968

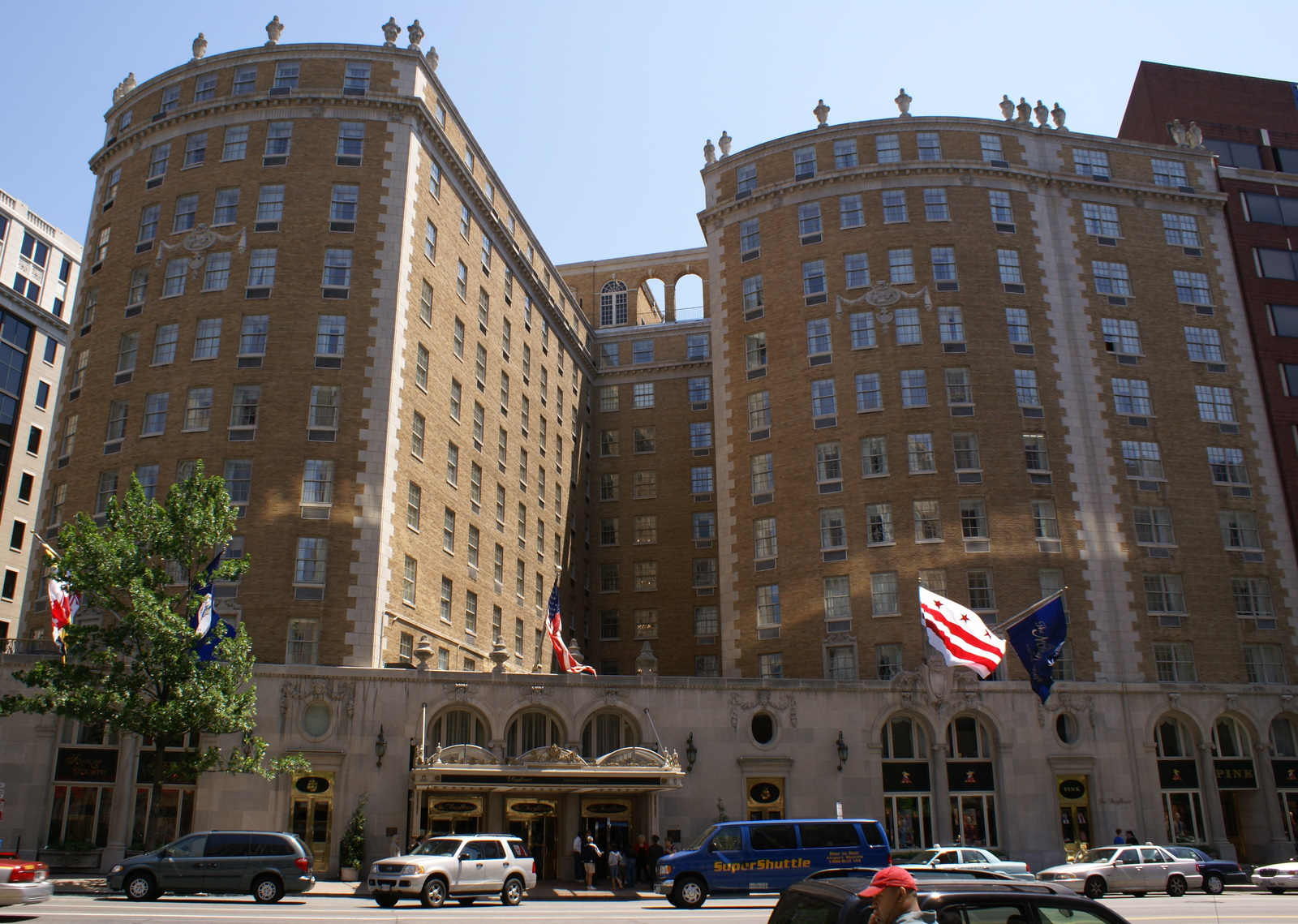
- The Mayflower Hotel, site of the 41st National Spelling Bee
- Date: June 5–6, 1968
- Location: The Mayflower Hotel in Washington, D.C.
- Winner: Robert L. Walters (14 at time of win)
- Sponsor: The Topeka Daily Capital
- Sponsor location: Topeka, Kansas
- Winning word: abalone
- No. of contestants: 75
- Pronouncer: Richard R. Baker

The 41st Scripps National Spelling Bee was held in Washington, D.C. at the Mayflower Hotel on June 5–6, 1968, sponsored by the E.W. Scripps Company.

The winner was 14-year-old Robert L. Walters of Russell, Kansas, correctly spelling "abalone." Second place went to Ann Johnson of Richfield, Minnesota, who stumbled on the word "myosin". The contest started on June 5 with 75 spellers, including 50 girls and 25 boys. By the end of round 19, only two spellers were left. At one point, both final contestants failed to spell "potiche" correctly. Third place went to Stephen Bacher of Middle Village, Queens, New York, who fell on "talmudical" in the 19th round. A total of 571 words were used.

Some local activities planned for the contestants were cancelled or changed due to the assassination of Robert F. Kennedy early on June 5.
