= South Asian Spelling Bee =

Spelling bee in the United States

- Genre: Spelling bee
- Frequency: Annual (mid August)
- Locations: New Brunswick, NJ
- Inaugurated: 2008
- Patron: Touchdown Media
- Website: www.southasianspellingbee.com

The South Asian Spelling Bee is an annual spelling bee competition in the United States for children of South Asian descent. The competition tours the country every June and July to find the top two spellers from various cities across the nation; while it once featured as many as twelve city stops, the current number is five. Since 2018, it also features a program similar to the Scripps National Spelling Bee's RSVBee, in which wild-card spellers can apply to compete at nationals. The competition is open to any student aged 14 or younger who has at least one parent or grandparent of South Asian descent, or whose lineage can be traced to Afghanistan, Bangladesh, Bhutan, India, Maldives, Nepal, Pakistan, or Sri Lanka. Since its launch in 2008, the South Asian Spelling Bee has been aired in over 120 countries on Sony Entertainment Television Asia as a multi-part series.

== Competition ==
Regional competitions are held in major South Asian-American hubs across the United States. As of 2017, the Bee visited the San Francisco Bay Area, Dallas, Chicago, Seattle, Charlotte, NC, New Jersey, the Washington Metropolitan Area, and Boston. As of 2019, the only remaining regionals are San Francisco Bay Area, Dallas, Charlotte, the Washington Metropolitan Area, and New Jersey. Spellers are enrolled by a parent or guardian to participate in any one regional contest. The top three spellers from each regional contest are awarded cash prizes. The winner and first runner-up in each of the regional contests are invited to participate in the national final, which takes place each August at or near Rutgers University in Piscataway, New Jersey. The national champion is awarded a $3,000 grand prize scholarship presented by the title sponsor.

== Media coverage ==
The South Asian Spelling Bee is featured across an array of South Asian-focused as well as mainstream media outlets. Produced for broadcast on Sony Entertainment Television Asia, the regional contests and finals are aired worldwide each year. Many South Asian-focused newspapers feature coverage of the bee each season, from the season launch through the national finals. In light of the successes of South Asian-American students when it comes to spelling contests, the Bee has gained recognition for its role in promoting academic talent. In 2008, the Bee was noted by BBC News as an emerging platform geared specifically towards this audience. In 2010, the Bee was recognized by the Wall Street Journal as a leading academic contest for South Asian-American youth.

== Previous National Champions (since 2011) ==
=== 2020 ===
The 2020 South Asian Spelling Bee was held online and was won by Aaron Chang with the word "sigloi". Aaron was the first champion of the South Asian Spelling Bee who wasn't of South Asian descent, as well as the first champion never to have won a South Asian Spelling Bee regional.

=== 2019 ===
The 2019 South Asian Spelling Bee champion, Navneeth Murali, took the first ever appeal win on the word "flype". Though he initially spelled the word as "flipe", it was accepted after some deliberation due to the fact that "flipe" is actually a separately listed variant of "flype". Navneeth went on to win the 2020 SpellPundit Online Spelling Bee, and also won many other major spelling bees, such as the North South Foundation Bee and the NASCC competition.

=== 2018 ===
2018 reduced to 6 regionals, the current five plus Chicago, and added 12 wild-card participants as well, many of whom did extremely well. Sohum Sukhatankar of Dallas became the first speller ever to win the South Asian Spelling Bee in their first-ever appearance, taking the title with "dasyuridae". He went on to become one of the "octochamps" of the 2019 Scripps National Spelling Bee.

=== 2017 ===
2017 saw the first reduction in scope, to 8 regionals, and also experienced a drop-out epidemic, with many regional champions and runners-up not attending nationals; however, the strongest contenders came, and Sravanth Malla of Haverstraw, New York won on "chytridiales"; he finished 6th in the 2018 Scripps National Spelling Bee.

=== 2016 ===
In 2016, the largest year for South Asian Spelling Bee nationals to date with 26 spellers, including most of the greatest of the time, Siyona Mishra of Orlando, Florida, who had previously placed 9th in Scripps, was the champion on "zubrowka".

=== 2015 ===
6th grader Shourav Dasari from Spring, Texas was the champion in 2015 with the winning word "psocoptera" (he went on to win the North South Foundation Senior Spelling Bee in the same year).

=== 2014 ===
In 2014, Gokul Venkatachalam from Chesterfield, Missouri won on the word "becquerel"; he placed 3rd at Scripps earlier that year and tied for 1st place at the 2015 Scripps National Spelling Bee, which saw co-champions for the second year in a row. Vanya Shivashankar of Olathe, Kansas, the other champion, tied for runner up at SASB behind Gokul in 2014.

=== 2013 ===
Sriram Hathwar of Painted Post, NY, won the 2013 bee on "phorminx." Sriram had previously done well in the Scripps Bee as well, placing 6th in 2011, 3rd in 2013, and becoming co-champion of the 2014 Scripps National Spelling Bee (along with Ansun Sujoe). They were the first co-champs in 52 years. Sriram also competed at Scripps in 2008 (as a second grader) and 2009.

=== 2012 ===
Syamantak Payra of Clear Creek, Texas was crowned the 2012 champion on the word "dghaisa." Payra went on to the place 7th and 37th in the 2013 and 2014 Scripps National Spelling Bee(s), respectively.

=== 2011 ===
In 2011, Narahari Bharadwaj of Plano, Texas won the bee on the word "schindylesis." Bharadwaj placed 14th in the 2011 Scripps National Spelling Bee.
