= 89th Scripps National Spelling Bee =

Spelling bee held in the United States in 2016

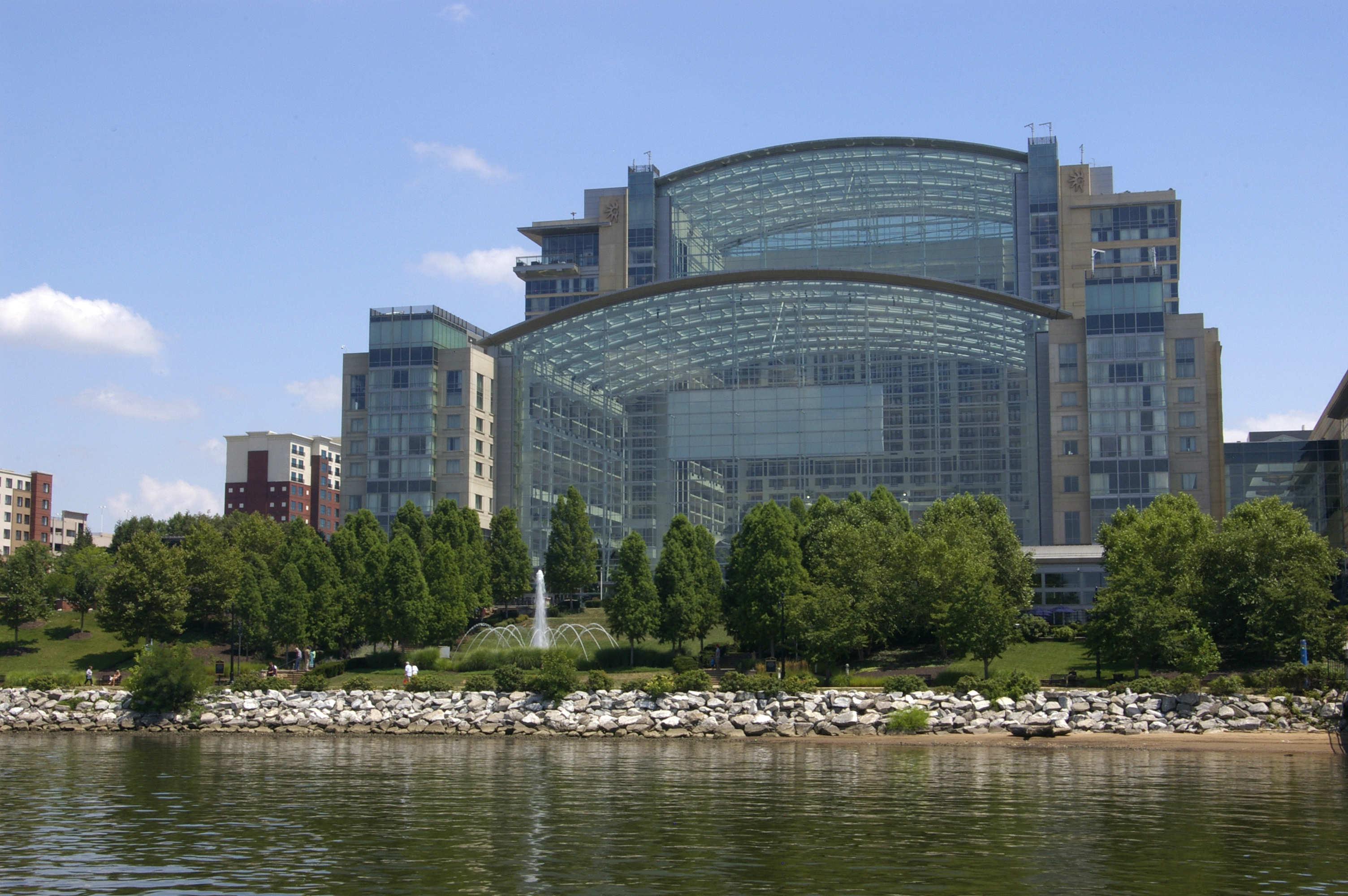
- Date: May 24–26, 2016
- Location: Gaylord National Resort & Convention Center, National Harbor, Maryland
- Winner: Co-winners: Jairam Hathwar; Nihar Janga (*13 (Hathwar); 11 (Janga); Austin, Texas (Janga) at time of win)
- Sponsor: Corning Rotary Club (Hathwar); Houston Public Media (Janga)
- Winning word: Feldenkrais (Hathwar); gesellschaft (Janga)
- No. of contestants: 284
- Pronouncer: Jacques Bailly

The 89th Scripps National Spelling Bee was held at the Gaylord National Resort & Convention Center in National Harbor, Maryland (its sixth year at this location) on May 24–26, 2016.

== Competition ==
The competition began with 284 contestants (143 boys and 141 girls), winnowed down from 11 million students who participated in local bees around the country. The age range of the spellers was 6 to 15, 70 of whom were making repeat appearances. 29 spellers were relatives of prior contestants. For the first time, a first-grader qualified, 6-year old Akash Vukoti of Texas.

On Tuesday May 24, all contestants took a written test. Then, on May 25, 34 contestants were eliminated when they missed their first word in the first oral round. By late on May 25, the field had been reduced to 171. After the written scores were added, the field was further reduced to 45 finalists.

The final rounds were held on May 26, beginning with the 45 finalists. After round 4, only 21 spellers were left, and after round 7 there were 10.

Notwithstanding efforts to avoid a third straight year of co-winners (see below), Jairam Hathwar and Nihar Janga were declared co-champions after 24 championship rounds.

Co-champion Nihar Janga, at age 11, was the first winner since 2002 to win in his first appearance at the national Bee. Jairam Hathwar became the second sibling of a past champion (his brother Sriram Hathwar was co-champion in 2014) to win the competition.

Thirteen-year old Snehaa Ganesh Kumar of Folsom, California, placed third, falling on "usucapion" in the 16th round, the first championship round. Sylvie Lamontagne of Lakewood, Colorado, also 13, placed fourth, missing "chaoborine" in the 15th round. The final four outlasted all other competitors by a full four rounds. Other finalists, in order, included Smrithi Upadhyayula, Rutvik Gandhasri, Cooper Komatsu, Sreeniketh Vogoti, Mitchell Robson, and Jashun Paluru.

== Changes this year ==
After two consecutive years where the Bee ended in a tie, it was announced in April 2016 that harder words would be used in the final rounds.

The first place prize this year was increased to $40,000 from $30,000, second to $30,000 and third to $20,000.

== Word list championship round ==
- myoclonus (Komatsu)
- pneumatomachy (Kumar)
- hirundine (Gandhasri)
- comitatus (Lamontagne)
- moshav (Vogoti)
- vasopressin (Paluru) (miss)
- esquisse (Robson)
- chaussure (Hathwar)
- epistaxis (Upadhyayula)
- galago (Janga)
- illicium (Komatsu) (miss)
- chubasco (Kumar)
- guyot (Gandhasri)
- panachure (Lamontagne)
- palagonite (Vogoti) (miss)
- Wehrmacht (Robson) (miss)
- ptyxis (Hathwar)
- levirate (Upadhyayula)
- lovat (Janga)
- soogee (Kumar)
- betony (Gandhasri) (miss)
- Venetic (Lamontagne)
- amanitin (Hathwar)
- chalazion (Upadhyayula)
- hypozeuxis (Janga)
- rhinolophid (Kumar)
- ptyalism (Lamontagne)
- calamistrum (Hathwar)
- theriaca (Upadhyayula) (miss)
- iiwi (Janga)
- prochoos (Kumar)
- shubunkin (Lamontagne)
- epergne (Hathwar)
- gisant (Janga)
- poitrel (Kumar)
- kakiemon (Lamontagne)
- caracal (Hathwar)
- bailliage (Janga)
- aplustre (Kumar)
- ekka (Lamontagne)
- Collyridian (Hathwar)
- quillon (Janga)
- nasaump (Kumar)
- chaoborine (Lamontagne) (miss)
- launeddas (Hathwar)
- berceuse (Janga)
- usucapion (Kumar) (miss)
- geländesprung (Hathwar)
- schepen (Janga)
- achalasia (Hathwar)
- cypraeiform (Janga)
- ripieno (Hathwar)
- melilot (Janga)
- lerot (Hathwar)
- giallolino (Janga)
- harmattan (Hathwar)
- appetitost (Janga)
- fothergilla (Hathwar)
- ergataner (Janga)
- keurboom (Hathwar)
- biniou (Janga)
- gyttja (Hathwar)
- taoiseach (Janga)
- chremslach (Hathwar)
- uintjie (Janga)
- whau (Hathwar)
- gerrhosaurid (Janga)
- drahthaar (Hathwar) (miss)
- rafraîchissoir (Janga)
- ayacahuite (Janga) (miss)
- doab (Hathwar)
- promyshlennik (Janga)
- lygaeid (Hathwar)
- écorché (Janga)
- krausen (Hathwar)
- villancico (Janga)
- myiasis (Hathwar)
- parinari (Janga)
- Stymphalian (Hathwar)
- ynambu (Janga)
- pavonazzetto (Hathwar)
- phulkari (Janga)
- Kjeldahl (Hathwar)
- haab (Janga)
- guignolet (Hathwar)
- Hohenzollern (Janga)
- juamave (Hathwar)
- Groenendael (Janga)
- Mischsprache (Hathwar) (miss)
- tetradrachm (Janga) (miss)
- zindiq (Hathwar)
- euchologion (Janga)
- Feldenkrais (Hathwar)
- gesellschaft (Janga)
