= Frank Neuhauser =

American spelling bee champion

- Born: Frank Louis Neuhauser; September 29, 1913; Louisville, Kentucky, U.S.
- Died: March 11, 2011 (aged 97); Silver Spring, Maryland, U.S.
- Occupation: Patent attorney
- Known for: Winning the 1st National Spelling Bee in 1925

Frank Louis Neuhauser (September 29, 1913 – March 11, 2011) was an American patent lawyer and spelling bee champion, who won the first National Spelling Bee (now known as the Scripps National Spelling Bee) in 1925 by successfully spelling the word "gladiolus". He was 11 years old when he won the spelling bee.

== Early life ==
Neuhauser was born in Louisville, Kentucky, on September 29, 1913, to German American parents. His father, a stonemason, worked on spelling with his son on weekends if the weather was bad.

=== National Spelling Bee ===
Neuhauser defeated nine finalists on stage, who had been whittled down from approximately two million schoolchildren, to win the first ever National Spelling Bee, held in Washington, D.C. in June 1925. He had prepared for the bee by copying the dictionary into a blank notebook. Neuhauser, who was eleven years old at the time of the contest, met U.S. President Calvin Coolidge and was awarded five hundred dollars in gold pieces for his victory. His hometown of Louisville, Kentucky gave Neuhauser a parade in his honor and presented him with bouquets of gladioli. His classmates and school also gave him a bicycle. During his later life, Neuhauser often appeared as a guest of honor at more recent spelling bees. He also appeared in the 2002 documentary film Spellbound.

=== Education ===
Neuhauser went on to obtain a bachelor's degree in engineering from the University of Louisville in 1934. He began working as a small appliance engineer for General Electric (GE), which offered to send him to law school in order to gain additional patent lawyers. Neuhauser received his law degree from George Washington University in 1940. He enlisted in the United States Navy during World War II.

== Later life and death ==
Following the end of World War II, Neuhauser returned to General Electric as a patent attorney. He worked for GE in Connecticut and New York City, before moving permanently to Maryland in the mid-1950s. He remained on the staff of General Electric, and, among other things, was manager of GE's Washington Patent Operation, where he formally trained many patent attorneys, in a training program that had 16 prospective patent attorneys at a time. In 1978 he left GE to join Bernard Rothwell & Brown, a law firm based in Washington, D.C.

Neuhauser formerly chaired the patent law divisions of both the District of Columbia Bar and the American Bar Association. He was the former president of the American Intellectual Property Law Association and the former chairman of the National Council of Patent Law Associations.

Neuhauser died from myelodysplastic syndrome at his home in Silver Spring, Maryland, on March 11, 2011, at the age of 97. He was survived by his wife of 66 years, Mary Virginia Clark Neuhauser; four children – Linda, Frank, Charles and Alan; and five grandchildren.
