= The Olathe News =

Newspaper published in Olathe, Kansas

- Type: Daily newspaper
- Format: Broadsheet
- Owner: The McClatchy Company
- Founded: 1861 (as The Mirror)
- Headquarters: 514 S. Kansas Ave. Olathe, KS 66061-4548; United States
- Circulation: 4,424
- ISSN: 1538-1722
- Website: www.theolathenews.com

The Olathe News is a newspaper based in Olathe, Kansas, in the United States. It was the sponsor to Kavya Shivashankar, the winner of the 2009 Scripps National Spelling Bee.

== See also ==
- List of newspapers in Kansas
