= Scripps National Spelling Bee =

Annual spelling bee held in the United States of America

- Genre: Spelling bee
- Frequency: Annual (late May or early June)
- Locations: National Harbor, Maryland (2011–2019, 2022–2025); Bay Lake, Florida (2021); Washington, D.C. (1925–1942, 1946–2010, 2026–present)
- Years active: 1925–1942, 1946–2019, 2021–present
- Inaugurated: 1925; 101 years ago
- Patron: The E. W. Scripps Company
- Website: www.spellingbee.com

The Scripps National Spelling Bee, formerly the Scripps Howard National Spelling Bee and often referred to as the National Spelling Bee or simply “the Spelling Bee” in the United States, is an annual spelling bee (word spelling contest) held in the United States. The Bee is run on a not-for-profit basis by the E. W. Scripps Company and is held in the Washington, D.C. metropolitan area during the week following Memorial Day weekend. Since 2026, it has been held at DAR Constitution Hall in Washington, D.C. From 2011 through 2025, except for 2021, it was hosted at the Gaylord National Resort & Convention Center in National Harbor, Maryland, just outside Washington, D.C. It was previously held at the Grand Hyatt Washington in Washington, D.C. from 1996 to 2010 and at the ESPN Wide World of Sports Complex in Bay Lake, Florida in 2021.

Although most of its participants are from the U.S., students from countries such as The Bahamas, Canada, the People's Republic of China, India, Ghana, Japan, Jamaica, Kuwait, Mexico, Nigeria, New Zealand, Syria, Pakistan, and the Palestinian Territories have also competed in recent years. Historically, the competition has been open to, and remains open to, the winners of sponsored regional spelling bees in the U.S. (including territories such as Guam, American Samoa, Puerto Rico, the Navajo Nation, and the U.S. Virgin Islands, along with overseas military bases in Germany and South Korea). Participants from countries other than the U.S. must be regional spelling bee winners as well.

In 2019, the Spelling Bee ran out of words that might challenge the contestants, and ended up having eight winners.

The 2020 National Spelling Bee competition, originally scheduled for May 24, was suspended and later canceled due to the COVID-19 pandemic. This was the first time it had been canceled since 1945.

As of the 2023 competition, contest participants cannot have reached their fifteenth birthday or have passed beyond eighth grade as of August 31 of the year before the competition. Previous winners are also ineligible to compete.

== History ==
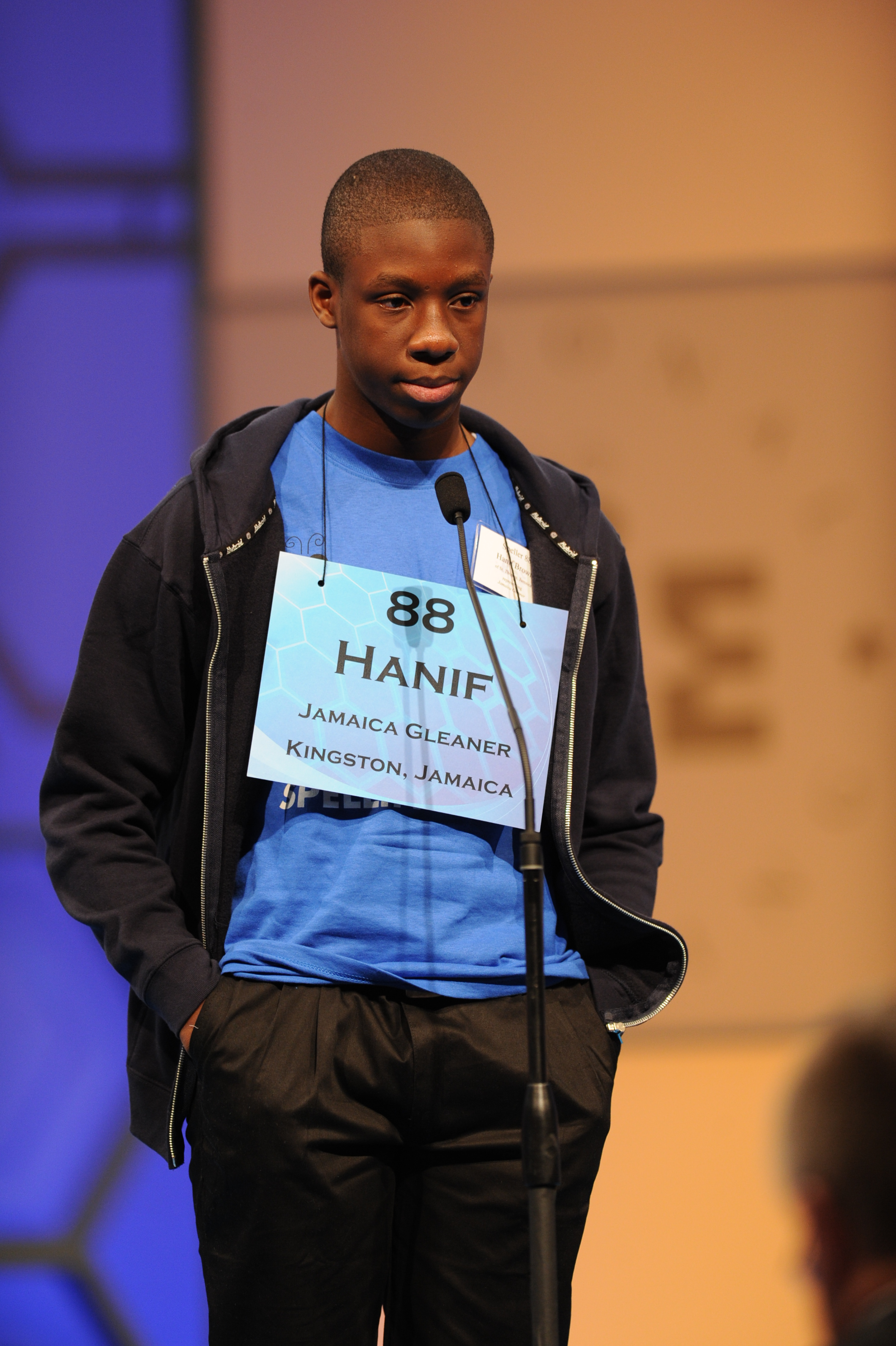
A Jamaican contestant from 2011

The National Spelling Bee was formed in 1925 as a consolidation of numerous local spelling bees, organized by The Courier-Journal in Louisville, Kentucky. Frank Neuhauser won the first National Spelling Bee held that year, by successfully spelling "gladiolus." The Bee has been held every year except for 1943–1945 due to World War II and 2020 due to the COVID-19 pandemic. The E.W. Scripps Company acquired the rights to the program in 1941. The Bee is held in late May and/or early June of each year. Its goal is educational: not only to encourage children to perfect the art of spelling, but also to help enlarge their vocabularies and widen their knowledge of the English language.

The Bee is the nation's largest and longest-running educational program, administered on a not-for-profit basis by The E.W. Scripps Company and hundreds of sponsors in the United States, Europe, Canada, New Zealand, Guam, Jamaica, The Bahamas, Ghana, Puerto Rico, the U.S. Virgin Islands, and American Samoa.

== The competition ==
=== Qualifying regional competitions ===
To qualify for the Scripps National Spelling Bee, a speller must win a regional competition. Regional spelling bees usually cover many counties, with some covering an entire state, U.S. territory, or foreign country. Regional competitions' rules are not required to correspond exactly to those of the national competition; most notably, the national competition has since 2004 featured time controls that are designed to ensure its conformity to the programming schedule of its nationwide television broadcaster (see Regulations of oral rounds below) and that are not intended to be implemented at lower levels of competition.

Most school and regional bees (known to Scripps as local spelling bees) use the official study booklet. Through competition year 1994, the study booklet was known as Words of the Champions; during competition years 1995 through 2006, the study booklet was the category-based Paideia; in 2007 the format and title were changed to the 701-word Spell It!, and since 2020 a new edition of Words of the Champions has been used. The booklet is published by Merriam-Webster in association with the National Spelling Bee. It contains 4,000 words, divided primarily by language of origin, along with exercises and activities in each section. Most bees whose winners advance to regional-level competition use the School Pronouncer's Guide, which contains a collection of Words of the Champions words as well as "off-list words" not listed in Words of the Champions but featured in Scripps' official dictionary, the unabridged Webster's Third New International Dictionary (published by Merriam-Webster).

Scripps provides a Sponsor Bee Guide to administrators of regional bees. The Sponsor Bee Guide consists of two volumes, each of which contains both words from Words of the Champions and "surprise words". Bees need not use the words from Words of the Champions to be considered official.

=== Sponsors ===
To participate in the national competition, a speller must be sponsored by a Regional Partner. The Scripps National Spelling Bee currently works with more than 175 newspapers, media outlets, sports teams, universities and other organizations across the U.S., Canada, The Bahamas, Asia, Africa, and Europe. Each Regional Partner organizes a spelling bee program in its community with the cooperation of area school officials: public, private, parochial, charter, virtual, and home schools.

Schools enroll with the national office to ensure their students are eligible to participate and to receive the materials needed to conduct classroom and school bees. During enrollment, school bee coordinators receive their local sponsor's program-specific information—local dates, deadlines, and participation guidelines.

=== Preliminaries ===
In the past, the Preliminaries had consisted of a test (Preliminaries Test) delivered by computer on Tuesday and two rounds of oral spelling onstage on Wednesday. Spellers may earn up to 36 points during the Preliminaries: up to 30 points on the Preliminaries Test, three points for correctly spelling in Round Two and three points for correctly spelling in Round Three. In 2021, the Preliminaries Test got omitted, and the Preliminaries now consists of three oral rounds.

The preliminaries consists of three rounds, with round one being a spelling section, round two being a vocabulary section, and round three concluding the preliminaries with a written test.

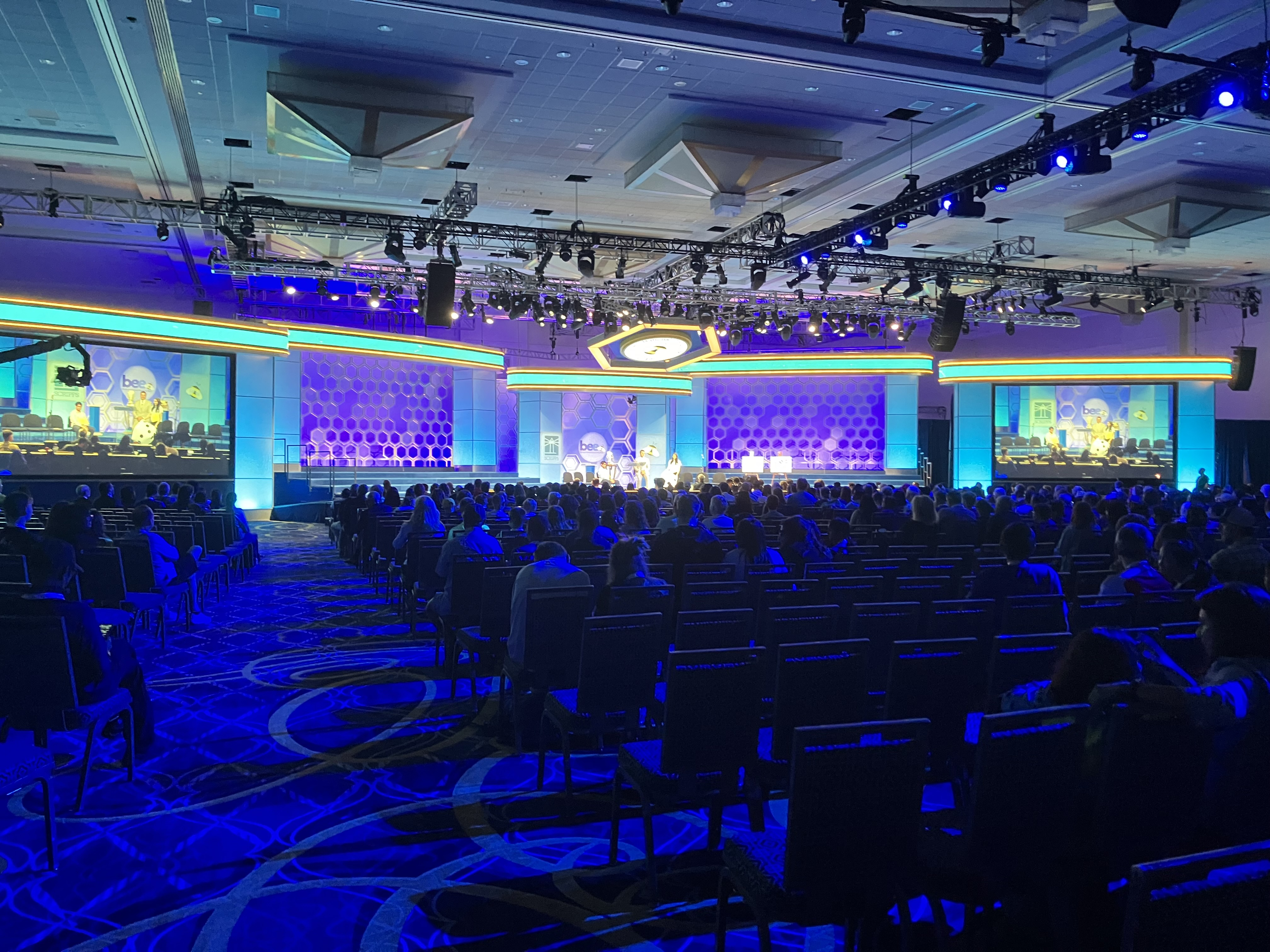
The spelling bee stage in 2025

==== History of Round One ====
Round One is an oral spelling round, with words deriving from the Bee's official list, Words of the Champions.

Round One was a written spelling test, and had changed in format several times. In the few years prior to 2008, Round One had consisted of a 25-word, multiple-choice written test. However, in 2010, changes were made in the formatting of this test. It consisted of 25 words, sometimes called "the written round". All spellers gathered at the Maryland Ballroom by 8:00 a.m. Jacques Bailly, the Bee's official pronouncer (also the champion) pronounced each word, its language of origin, definition, and usage in a sentence. Spellers are given a 30-second pause in which to write down their word with the two pens given to them, and then Bailly repeated the word and all information. There was another 30-second pause, and then they moved on to the next word. Each correctly spelled word on the Round One written test was worth one point. In 2011, they stayed with that format. In 2012, they changed to the original computerized test, 50 spelling words, half scored and half not scored.

Beginning in 2013, the Preliminaries now includes vocabulary questions, such as being asked to choose the correct definition for a word. While met with criticism by past contestants for deviating from the concept of a spelling bee, organizers indicated that the change was made to help avert perceptions that the competition was based solely on memorization skills (as had been showcased by television broadcasts), and to help further the Bee's goal of expanding the vocabulary and language skills of children.

==== Round Two ====
Round Two is an oral round, in which each contestant must answer a vocabulary question from the "Words of the Champions" list as specified by the judges.

Historically, Round Two was a spelling round where a correct spelling awarded three points, while a miss eliminated the contestant. In the latter case, the judges gave the correct spelling. All contestants eliminated in this round tie for the same place in the final rankings.

==== Round Three ====
During Round Three, all remaining spellers take a 40-question written test, consisting of 28 spelling words and 12 vocabulary questions. Five questions are not included in the final test score unless a tiebreaker is necessary, meaning the test is scored out of 35. To advance to the quarterfinals, spellers must meet or exceed a cutoff score selected to advance as close to 100 spellers as possible.

Prior to the 2025 edition of the Bee, spellers had access to a 500-word study list in which all of the words from Round Three were picked out of named the Preliminaries Study Guide. In the past, before the advent of the Preliminaries Study Guide, Round Three followed the same format as Round Two's spelling round, but each contestant's word was chosen from the Merriam-Webster Unabridged Dictionary. After this round, the remaining contestants' total scores were used to determine the semifinalists.

==== Quarterfinals and semifinals ====
Round Four changed in 2016. Scripps dropped the semi-finals test and had added a Tiebreaker Test (however, it was only used in 2017 and 2018), in which the spellers took a test similar to the Preliminaries Test, but containing harder and more confusing words. As a result, there was controversy, and Scripps dropped the Tiebreaker Test in 2019, in which eight co-champions won.

Round Four is now an oral spelling round and the start of the Quarterfinals. There are neither a study list nor set rounds for the quarterfinalists. The contestants who last throughout quarterfinalists will be deemed semifinalists.

Some rounds are vocabulary rounds in which spellers are given a word and three possible definitions. To advance, the speller must give the correct definition within 30 seconds.

==== Finals ====
At the end of the semifinals, the remaining spellers thin out into 10–16, and all the remaining spellers are invited to spell in the finals. This can go on until the word list is exhausted and the judges move on to the 25 championship rounds until a champion, or a group of joint champions (until 2019) is crowned, or after that, the shootout round.

When one speller remains after a round, special rules apply. The remaining player must spell one more word correctly to win the bee. The speller cannot be eliminated with a misspell, which would result in all spellers from the previous round being reinstated.

===== Shootout =====
Following the 2019 final, where the championship round ran to its conclusion without a winner being determined, and to meet time constraints, for 2020, officials planned a new tiebreaking round.

At the end of the championship round, either by exhausting the championship word list without a determinate winner, or if the broadcast (currently produced by Sony Pictures Television) reaches a set point in the broadcast (according to the rules, the round that concludes after 1 hour, 55 minutes into the broadcast), the winner will be determined by a shootout round, known as the spell-off.

All remaining players are sequestered backstage for security until it is the player's turn to compete. Each shootout participant receives the same list of words, in order, and have 1 minute, 30 seconds to spell as many words as possible in the round; the player must press a buzzer to inform the official they are ready for the next word. The definition, language of origin, and part of speech of each word is displayed on a monitor. The speller is allowed to ask questions to the pronouncer, but they are using their own time to do so. Incorrectly spelled words do not eliminate the player during the shootout; however, the number of incorrect words will count against the player in case of a further tie.

The speller that spells the most words correctly in the round (words not completed within the time do not count towards the tally) is declared the champion.

If multiple players have spelled the same number of words, the tiebreaker is percentage of correctly spelled words from the words the player was given. If multiple spellers have the same number and percentage of correctly spelled words, the event is a tie and co-champions are crowned.

=== Regulations of oral rounds ===
Before 2004, a speller could not be required to spell a given word until the judges deemed that the word had been clearly pronounced and identified by the speller; even then, judges rarely if ever instructed a contestant to begin spelling unless it was obvious that the speller was making no further progress in figuring out the word and that he/she was instead simply "stalling for time". Most local and regional competitions continue to follow this rule and enforcement pattern, although they are not obliged to do so.

Starting in 2004, the Bee adopted new rules. A speller is given two and a half minutes from when a word is first pronounced to spell it completely. The first two minutes are Regular Time; the final thirty seconds are Finish Time. During this time limit, a speller is allowed to ask the pronouncer for the word's:

- Definition
- Part of speech
- Use in a sentence
- Language(s) of origin (the complete etymology of the word is not provided)
- Alternate pronunciations
- Root (Spellers may ask if a word is derived from a certain root or word element, but must give that root, its language of origin, and definition.)
- Repeat the word

A chime signals that regular time has expired, and the judges inform the speller that Finish Time has begun. The speller may watch a clock counting down from thirty seconds; no timing devices are allowed onstage. During Finish Time, a speller may not make further requests to the pronouncer but rather must begin spelling the word. Any speller who exceeds the time limit is automatically eliminated; judges do not acknowledge letters spelled after the end of Finish Time. A speller is allowed to stop spelling a word and restart spelling, but if (s)he changes the letters already said, the alteration counts as a misspelling and causes automatic elimination.

In addition, any speller that went into Finish Time twice during the bee had their Regular Time reduced to 90 seconds for the remainder of the Bee.

Starting in the 2015 Bee, the time limit was reduced to two minutes, indicated by a monitor with a traffic light on it. For the first 75 seconds, the traffic light is green. Once 45 seconds remain, the light turns yellow and a countdown appears on the screen. While the light is green or yellow, the speller is free to request information from the pronouncer as listed above. Once 30 seconds remain, the light turns red and the speller must begin spelling the word as in Finish Time above.

The 2023 Bee reduced the time limit further to 90 seconds; the traffic light system introduced in the 2015 Bee remained in place, with the light remaining green for the first 60 seconds, turning yellow (and the countdown appearing) at 30 seconds remaining, and red (with Finish Time rules going into effect) at 15 seconds remaining.

== Recent spelling bees ==
Year	Competition details
2013	86th competition
2014	87th competition
2015	88th competition
2016	89th competition
2017	90th competition
2018	91st competition
2019	92nd competition
2021	93rd competition
2022	94th competition
2023	95th competition
2024	96th competition
2025	97th competition - "100 Years of the Bee"
2026	98th competition

== Proposed international bee ==
In May 2012, Scripps announced tentative plans for an international version, in which three-person teams from as many as sixty countries would compete. Although each speller would be able to confer with teammates once during each contest, all spellers would eventually compete and win prizes as individuals. If logistical and financial details can be reached, the event would be officially announced in early 2013 with the first competition to take place the following December. As of 2015, these plans are on hold.

== Champions and winning words ==
=== Prizes ===
As of the 2019 competition, the first place prize was raised from $40,000 to $50,000, and in the event of a tie, the two winners will split the first and second place ($25,000) awards ($37,500 each).

The winner also receives other prizes, such as an engraved loving cup trophy from Scripps, a $2,500 savings bond, a reference library from Merriam-Webster, $400 in reference works and a lifetime membership to Britannica Online Premium from Encyclopædia Britannica, and $1,000 in Scholastic Dollars from Scholastic.

All spellers receive a spelling bee prize package, an online subscription to both Webster's Unabridged Dictionary and Encyclopaedia Britannica, and the Samuel Louis Sugarman Award, which is a United States Proof Set. The speller's school gets a one-year subscription to News-O-Matic, a children's educational website.

As of 2025, quarterfinalists get a $100 gift card, semifinalists get a $500 gift card, finalists get $2,000 in cash, 7th place gets $2,500 in cash, and 6th place gets $5,000 in cash. From there, it increases by increments of $5,000 until 2nd place ($20,000) and 1st place ($50,000).

== Historical format and prizes ==
For the first three decades of the bee (1925–1957), the spelling competition was held on a single day. This presented no problem in the Bee's early years, which had only nine contestants in 1925, and did not crack 50 contestants before 1950. After the 1957 bee took almost 10 hours to complete (the second-ever tie after the word list was exhausted), the bee moved to a two-day format in 1958. As the number of contestants continued to increase (first breaking 100 in 1978), an opening practice round was eliminated at the 1987 bee due to a record 185 entrants.

After a three-day bee was held for the first time in 2001, a written test was added for the first time in 2002 to help keep the bee to two days of competition. In 2002 and 2003, a 25-word written test was given after an opening oral round.

For most of its early years, the first place prize was either $500 or $1000. It was $500 in gold pieces in the first bee in 1925, and doubled to $1000 the next year. It dropped back to $500 in the 1933 bee during the Great Depression, and only returned to $1000 in 1956. In 1987, the first place prize was raised to $1,500, and all spellers after reaching 10th place received $50. By 1993 it was $5,000. In 2007, the prize was $50,000 in cash, but in 2009, the prize dropped to $35,000 in cash and more than $5,000 in prizes. In 2012, the prize dropped yet again to $30,000 in cash and just over $10,000 in prizes, savings bonds, and scholarships. In 2015, the prize increased to $38,600 in cash, and increased again in 2016 to $40,000 cash prize, where it stayed the same until 2018, when the prize was increased to $50,000 cash, which was equivalent to the cash prize eleven years before.

== Media coverage ==
CNN was one of the first television channels to carry coverage of the Scripps National Spelling Bee, with personalities including Anderson Cooper and 1979 champion Katie McCrimmon. Scripps CEO Rich Boehne described its coverage as having been "very hit or miss", explaining that "I'd sit and watch and see a little snippet of some coverage and then somebody would cut out and go somewhere else." Boehne began to contemplate how the event could be presented for television in a manner that would be more compelling to viewers. In 1994, Scripps began an agreement with ESPN to broadcast coverage of the national finals; the network added a larger focus on analysis and profiles on the competitors. The broadcasts were credited with having brought greater prominence to the event. ESPN would later expand its coverage to encompass the early rounds of the competition as well, and added features such as a "play-along" broadcast on its streaming platforms.

In May 2006, it was announced that the finals of the Scripps National Spelling Bee would be moved to primetime on ESPN's sister broadcast network ABC, with Robin Roberts of ESPN and Good Morning America serving as host. ABC executives positioned the primetime broadcast as a form of reality television, while the move came on the heels of the release of Akeelah and the Bee—a drama film based on the event. By 2013, the ABC broadcast had been dropped, with the finals returning exclusively to ESPN.

In October 2021, Scripps announced that the event's broadcast would move to its co-owned broadcast television networks Bounce TV and Ion Television beginning in 2022; the company promoted that the event would be "accessible to the widest audience in its nearly 100-year history". The 2025 preliminary and final rounds were set to be broadcast on various Scripps-owned TV networks and digital channels, in some cases airing as a specially-marketed "Special Presentation."

== In popular culture ==
=== Fiction ===
The drama film Bee Season (2005), based on Myla Goldberg's novel of the same name, follows a young girl's journey through various levels of spelling-bee competition to the Scripps National Spelling Bee, as did the drama film Akeelah and the Bee (2006).

The 2nd episode of season 1 of Psych, "Spellingg Bee", dealt with a murder during a Spelling Bee event.

Contestants in the musical-comedy play The 25th Annual Putnam County Spelling Bee, which ran on Broadway starting in 2005, are competing for a spot in the National Spelling Bee.

The 2013 film Bad Words revolves around a forty-year-old eighth grade dropout (Jason Bateman) attempting to win a fictional equivalent of the SNSB.

=== Nonfiction ===
The Netflix documentary Spelling the Dream (2020) chronicles the ups and downs of four Indian-American students as they compete to realize their dream of winning the iconic Scripps National Spelling Bee.

The Academy Award-nominated documentary film Spellbound (2002) follows eight competitors, including eventual national winner Nupur Lala, through the 1999 competition.

The book American Bee, by James Maguire, profiles five spellers who made it to the final rounds of the competition – Samir Sudhir Patel, Katharine Close, Aliya Deri, Jamie Ding, and Marshall Winchester – as well as giving an overview of the history of the bee.

Multiple episodes of the ESPN Classic show Cheap Seats featured the hosts revisiting broadcasts of the Bee from the 1990s.

2021 champion Zaila Avant-garde was a holder of multiple basketball Guinness World Records, and the first African-American contestant to win the bee. She has published two books: Words of Wonder from Z to A and It's not Bragging If It's True: How to be Awesome at Life.
