= Gaylord National Resort & Convention Center =

Hotel and convention center in National Harbor, MD

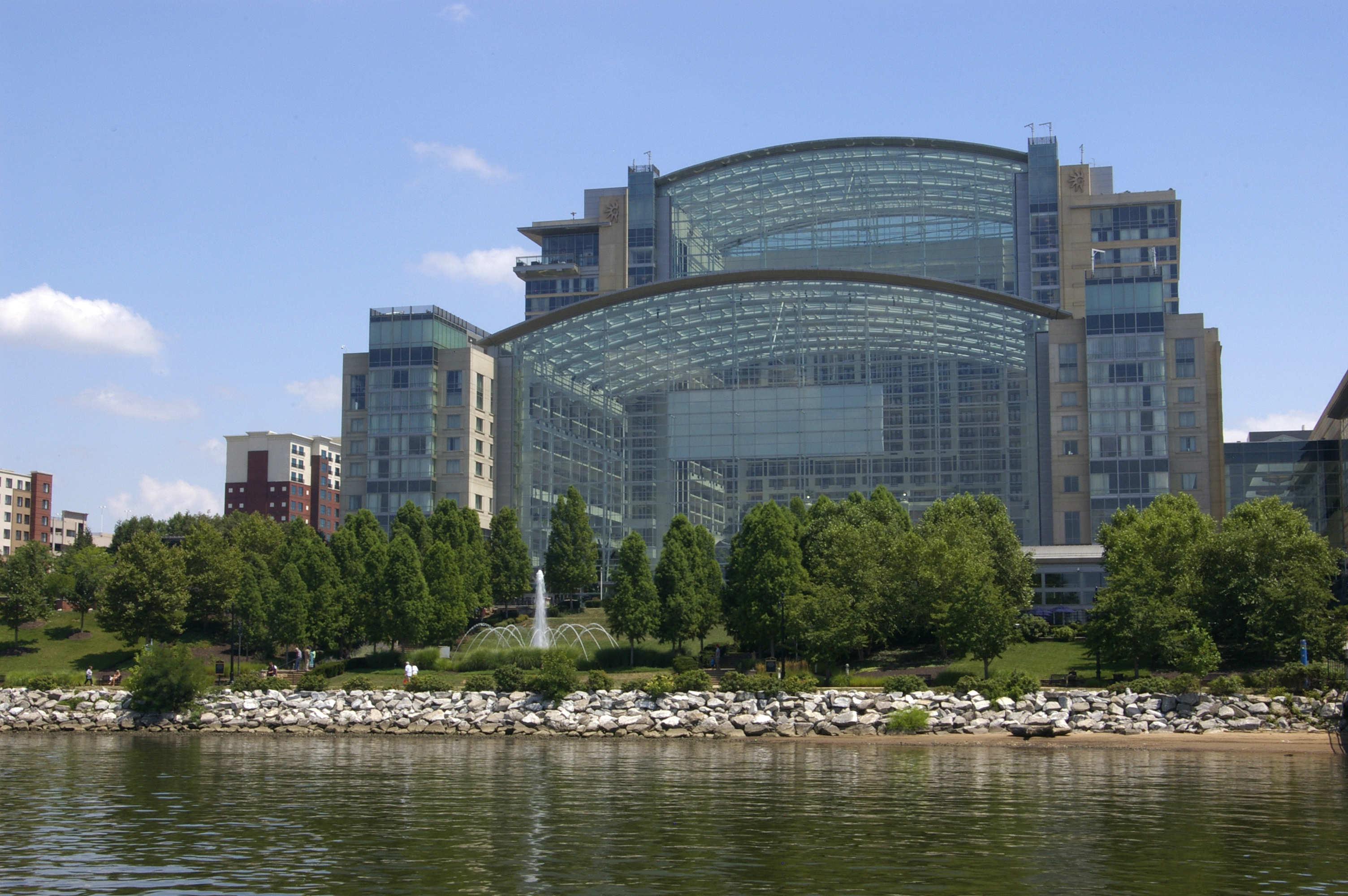
- Gaylord National Resort & Convention Center in National Harbor, Maryland in October 2007

General information
- Location: 201 Waterfront Street, National Harbor, Maryland, U.S.
- Coordinates: 38°46′54.5″N 77°0′59.5″W
- Opening: April 1, 2008
- Owner: Ryman Hospitality Properties
- Operator: Marriott International

Technical details
- Floor count: 19

Design and construction
- Architect: Gensler

Other information
- Number of rooms: 1996
- Number of suites: 110
- Number of restaurants: 3

Website
- gaylordhotels.com/gaylord-national/

The Gaylord National Resort & Convention Center is a hotel and convention center located at National Harbor, Prince George's County, in the U.S. state of Maryland. The hotel is situated along the shores of the Potomac, downriver from Washington, D.C., and across the river from Alexandria, Virginia. It is owned by Gaylord Hotels, a division of Ryman Hospitality Properties (formerly known as Gaylord Entertainment Company), and operated by Marriott International. The hotel opened April 1, 2008, as part of a new mixed-use (office, residential, and retail) development in National Harbor. It is one of the largest non-gaming hotel and convention centers on the East Coast of the United States. It cost $870 million to build.

The center was originally named the Gaylord Potomac Resort & Convention Center; the name was changed in the planning stage. The hotel contains 2,000 guest rooms, 95 event rooms, 537,430 square feet (49,929 m^{2}) of meeting space, seven restaurants, and a 20,000-square-foot (1,900 m^{2}) spa. It employs 2,000 people. It features a 19-story glass atrium with views of the Potomac River.

It had over 1.3 million room nights booked before its formal opening on April 1, 2008. Other adjacent hotels and facilities were under construction at the time.

== Events ==
The convention center hosted the 2011 Republican National Committee Winter Meeting, at which the 2011 Republican National Committee chairmanship election took place. It also hosts Katsucon, a celebration of anime. The Gaylord also has hosted MAGFest, a yearly festival celebrating video games, video game music, and culture, since 2012. The annual Scripps National Spelling Bee was at the Gaylord from 2011 to 2025.

In 2014, 2019, and 2026 respectively, the Gaylord hosted the 36th, 41st, and 48th annual Technology Student Association National Conferences.

In 2016, the hotel also hosted Major League Baseball's Winter Meetings.

Some departments within the property are represented by different trade unions, the largest being Local 25 of the Unite Here! trade organization.

In 2024, the annual Conservative Political Action Conference was held at The Gaylord. Also in 2024, the Restaurant Facility Management Association (RFMA) held its annual conference there.

In December 2024, the Gaylord hosted the National Grade Chess Championships.

== Image gallery ==
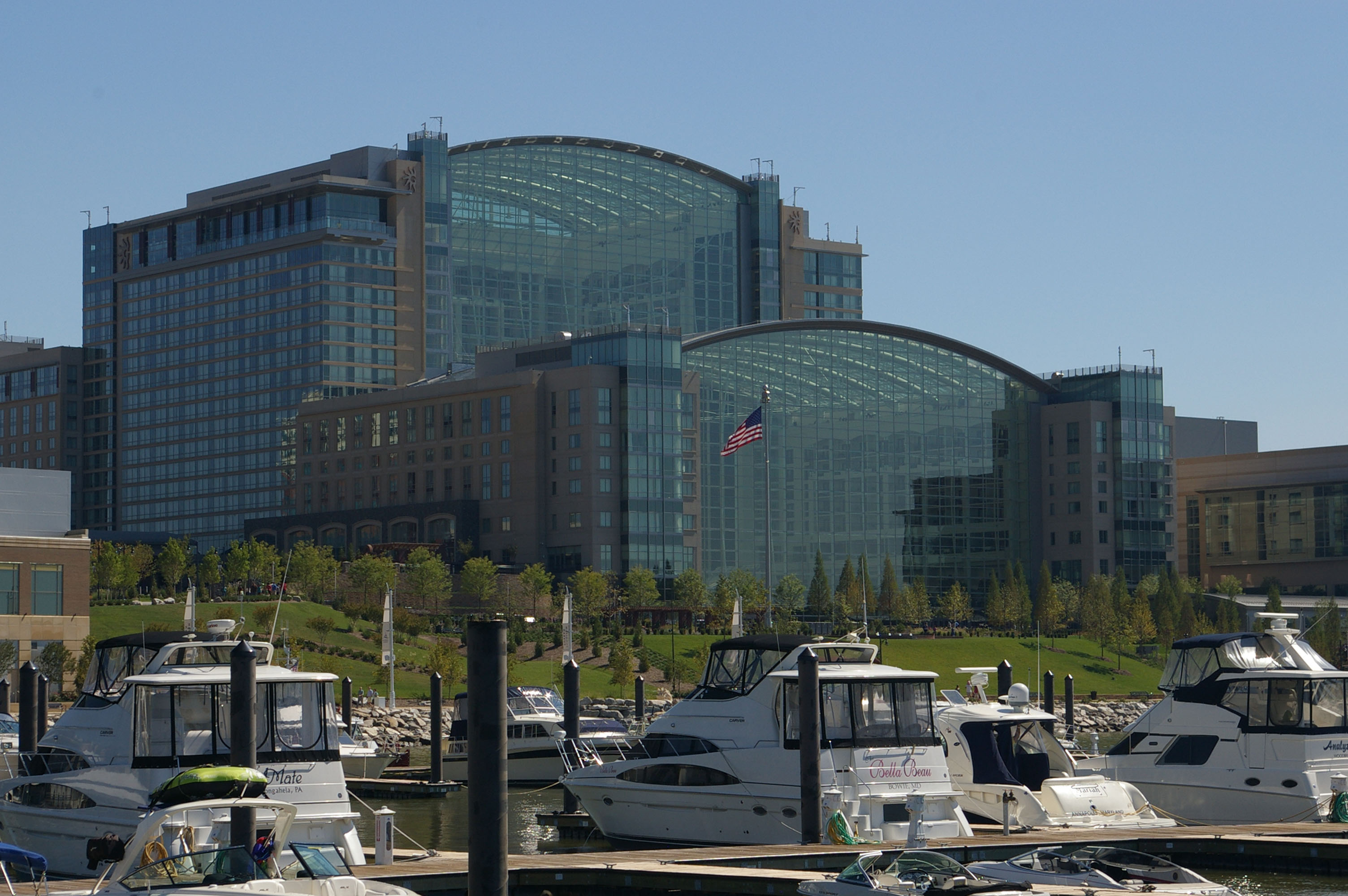
Gaylord National Resort

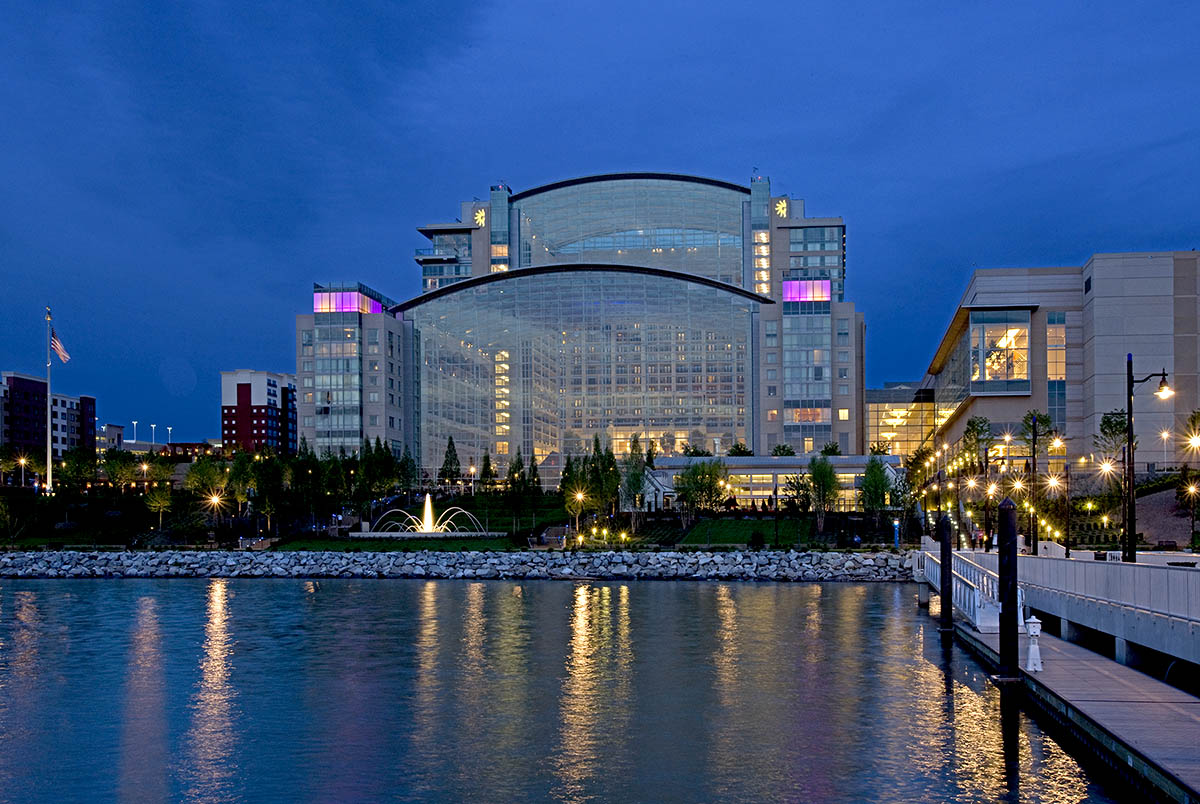
Gaylord Resort and Hotel

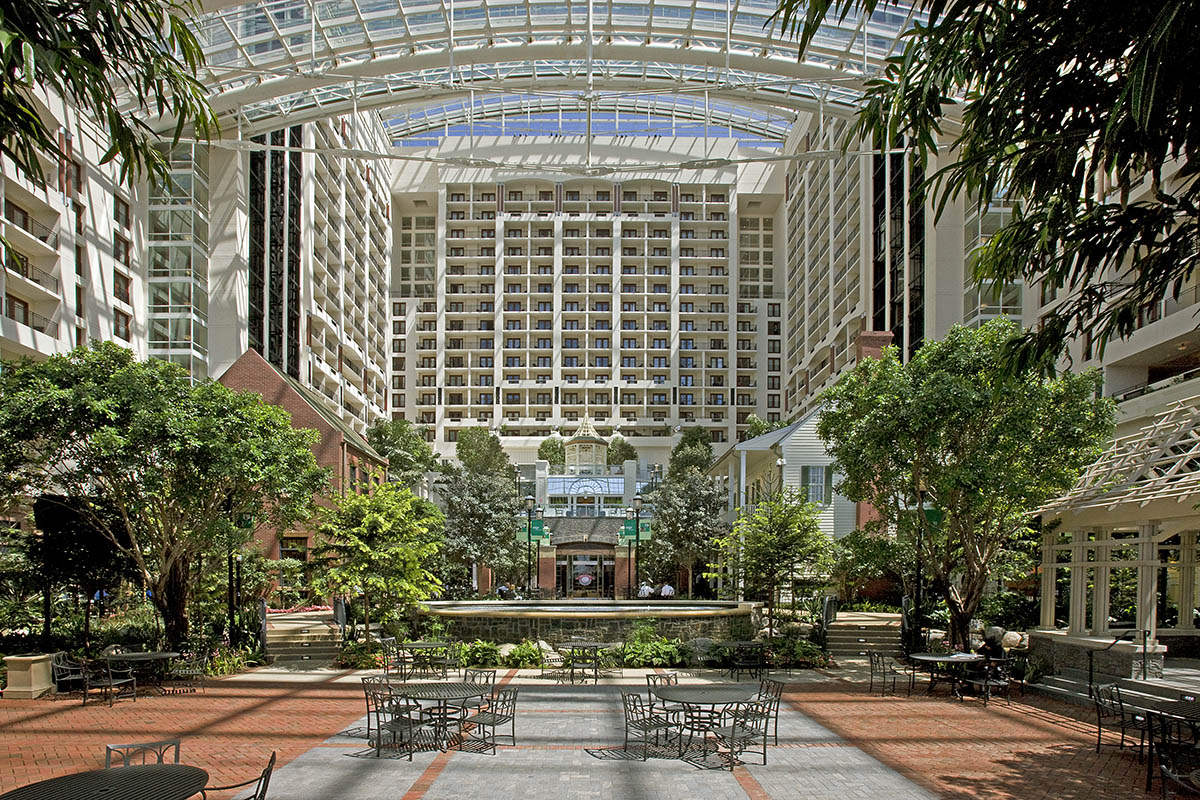
The atrium of the Gaylord Resort and Hotel

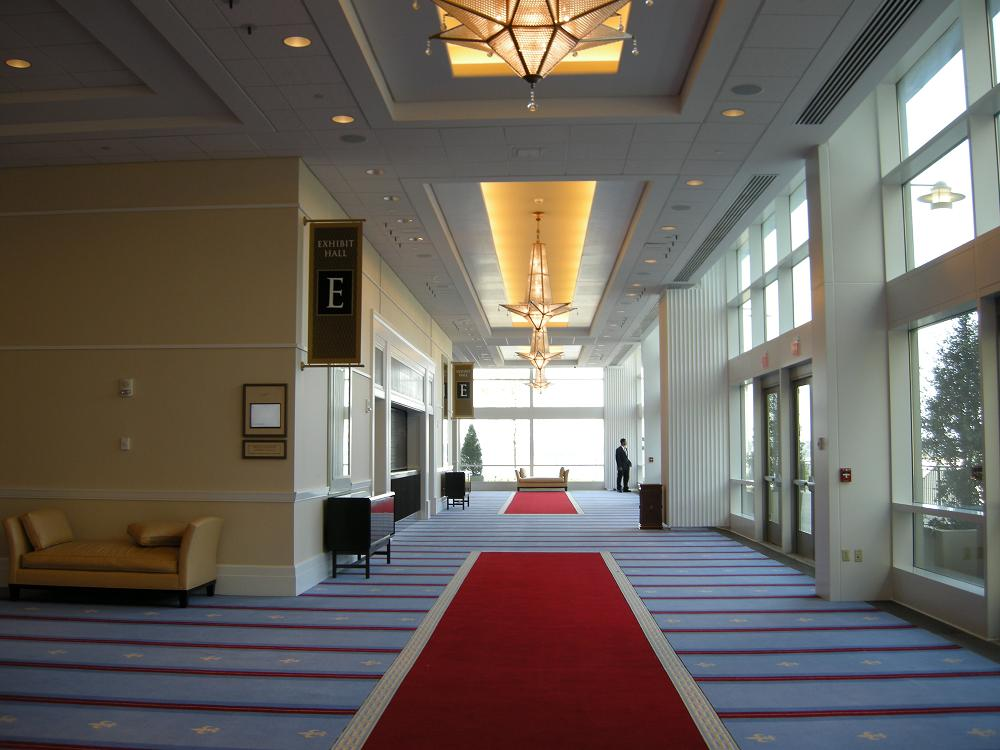
Gaylord National Convention Center hallway view toward the Potomac River

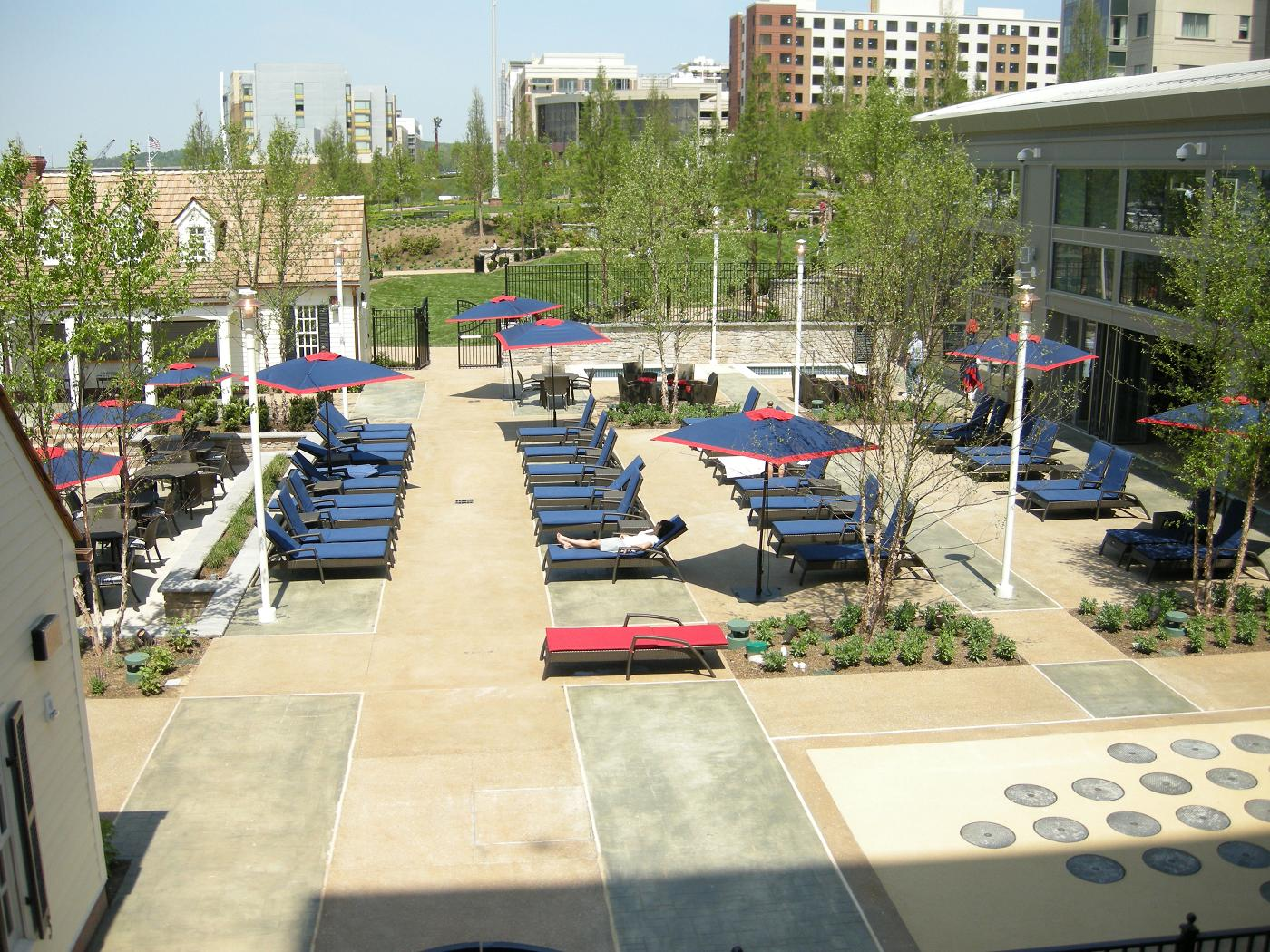
Pool lounging area with National Harbor buildings (in background)
