= Jacques Bailly =

Scripps National Spelling Bee pronouncer

Jacques A. Bailly
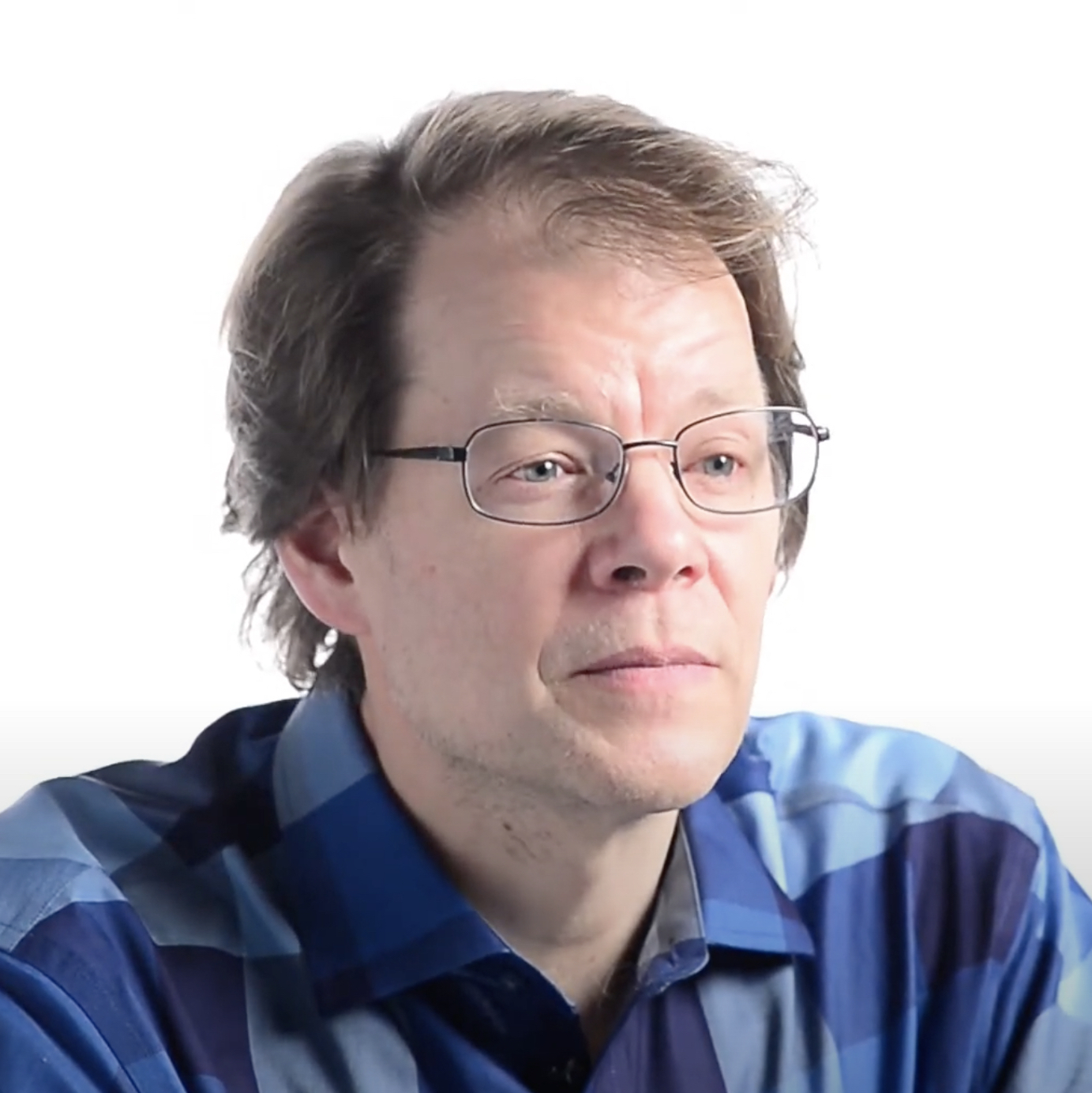
- Bailly in 2017
- Born: January 28, 1966 (age 60)
- Education: Brown University (BA); Cornell University (PhD)
- Employer: University of Vermont
- Organization: Scripps National Spelling Bee
- Television: Scripps National Spelling Bee
- Spouse: Leslyn Hall
- Children: 2

Jacques A. Bailly (born January 28, 1966) is an American professor. He was the 1980 Scripps National Spelling Bee champion and has served as the Scripps National Spelling Bee's official pronouncer since 2003.

== Biography ==
Bailly was born in 1966 and grew up in the Denver, Colorado, area. He began participating in spelling bees in sixth grade, training with a nun at his Catholic school. He reached the National Spelling Bee as an eighth grader and won with the word "elucubrate". Bailly studied Ancient Greek and Latin, receiving his bachelor's degree from Brown University in classics and his Ph.D. from Cornell University. He learned German in Switzerland with the help of a Fulbright scholarship.

In 1990, Bailly wrote the National Spelling Bee organizers, offering his services, and was hired as an associate pronouncer. Bailly became the Bee's chief pronouncer after Alex Cameron died in 2003. Bailly works full-time as an associate professor of classics at the University of Vermont, specializing in Greek and Roman philosophy, particularly Plato. Bailly portrayed himself in the 2006 film Akeelah and the Bee, which focuses on a girl who competes in the National Spelling Bee.

Bailly is married to Leslyn Hall. They have two children and a dog.

== See also ==
- List of Scripps National Spelling Bee champions

Preceded by Katie Kerwin McCrimmon	Scripps National Spelling Bee winner 1980	Succeeded by Paige Pipkin
