= Faizullah =

Faizullah, also spelled Fayzullah or Feizollah (Arabic: فيض الله) is a male Muslim given name, composed of the elements Faiz and Allah. It means Success from God or Victory from God. In modern usage it may appear as a surname. Notable people with the name include:

== Males ==
- Faizullah Khan (c. 1730–1793), Nawab of Rampur (India)
- Feyzullah Mirza Qajar (1872–1920), Iranian prince
- Muhammad Faizullah (1892–1976), Bangladeshi Islamic scholar and poet
- Fayzulla Xoʻjayev (1896–1938), Uzbek politician
- Feizollah Nasseri (born 1955), Iranian weightlifter
- Faiz Ullah Kamoka (born 1970), Pakistani politician
- Sajjad Feizollahi (born 1987), Iranian footballer
- Erton Fejzullahu (born 1988), Swedish-Kosovan footballer
- Feyzullah Aktürk (born 1999), Turkish wrestler
- Abbosbek Fayzullaev (born 2003), Uzbek footballer
- Faizullah (Taliban leader), allegedly sent 300 fighters to Afghanistan in 2003
- Fayez Ullah, Bangladeshi Islamic scholar and politician

== Females ==
- Shovkat Feyzulla qizi Alakbarova, or just Shovkat Alakbarova, (1922–1993), Azerbaijani singer

== See also ==
- Feyzullah Mosque
