= Faiza =

Name list

- Pronunciation: [Fa-e-za] Or [Faa-i-za]
- Gender: Female

Origin
- Meaning: Victorious, winner and successful
- Region of origin: Western Asia

Other names
- Related names: Faiz, Faizan, Fayez

Faiza (Arabic: فائزة) is a female Arabic name meaning "successful, victorious, beneficial". Variants include: Faizah, Faiza, Fayzah, Fayza, Feyza, Faeyza, Faeyzah, Faihza, Faaiza, Faaizah, Fiza, Faisa, Fayeza, Fayiza, Faeeza; and related to the male names Faiz, Faizan, and Fayez. Faiza (فائزة) is derived from its root word Fa'iz (فائز) which means successful. Notable people with the name include:

== Given name ==
- Faiza Ali, American activist and official
- Faiza Ambah, Saudi Arabian journalist
- Faiza Darkhani (born 1992), Afghani environmentalist, women's rights activist, and educator
- Faïza Kefi (born 1949), Tunisian jurist, politician and diplomat
- Faiza Rauf (1923–1994), Egyptian royal
- Faiza Shaheen (born 1982/3), British academic and economist
- Faiza Zafar (born 1996), Pakistani squash player
- Fayza Ahmed (1934–1983), Arab singer

== See also ==
- Faizan
- Faiz
