= Rokka Mosque =

Former mosque in Arta, Greece

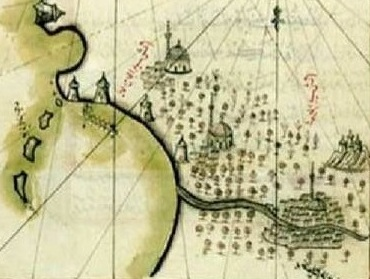
- The mosque in a map by Piri Reis (upper left).

- Location within Greece

Religion
- Affiliation: Islam
- Prefecture: Arta
- Region: Epirus
- Ecclesiastical or organizational status: Destroyed

Location
- Location: Arta
- State: Greece
- Interactive map of Rokka Mosque
- Prefecture: Arta

Architecture
- Type: Mosque
- Style: Ottoman architecture
- Completed: 15th century
- Materials: Brick, stone

The Mosque of Rokka (Greek: Τζαμί στα Ρόκκα, Albanian: Xhamia e Rokës) was an Ottoman-era mosque in the small suburb of Rokka, near the town of Arta, Epirus, in northwest Greece. It was one of the eight mosques of Arta, and among the six that do not survive.

== History ==
During Ottoman times, there used to be eight mosques in Arta and the surrounding region: Feyzullah Mosque, Sultan Mehmed Mosque, Sultan Bayazid Mosque, Kiliç Bey Mosque, Tekke Mosque and Bey Mosque within the limits of Arta proper, and Faik Pasha Mosque and Rokka Mosque just outside of Arta. Feyzullah and Faik Pasha are the two that survive to this day.

The exact year of the construction of the mosque at Rokka is not known, however it has been suggested that it was built around the same time as the Faik Pasha Mosque, as it is depicted on a map by Ottoman writer Piri Reis in the fifteenth century. Reis in his work depicted Arta with three mosques, one in the castle, the Faik Pasha Mosque, and the one at Rokka. Similarly unknown are the reasons why a mosque was built in such a small settlement, as up until the end of the seventeenth century in the region the only Muslim presence was a small Ottoman military force; the first Muslim citizens would arrive in 1684, after their flight from Preveza, which had fallen into the hands of the Venetians. Those Muslims were settled in the town of Arta and Rokka, the nearby village.

The report of the Russian vice-consulate of Arta in 1877 records the existence of fifty Christian families and thirty Muslim families in the village of Rokka. There were two schools, one Christian and one Muslim, a church and a mosque in the village. Serapheim Xenopoulos, the metropolitan of Arta in 1864–1894, wrote that Rokka was inhabited by twenty-two Christian families and thirty Muslim ones. The Christians used the Church of Saint George, while the mosque served the needs of the Muslim community. According to the metropolitan, the Rokka mosque was unique among the mosques in Arta as the only one not to have been built on top of a pre-existing Christian church.

After the wider region of Arta was annexed by Greece in 1912 (Note: Arta itself had been part of Greece since 1881, but the wider Epirus region only came to the hands of the Greeks in 1912-1913.) following the victory of the Balkan League during the First Balkan War, the Muslims of Epirus fled the area and the mosque at Rokka was subjected to the same fate as most other Ottoman monuments in the region, which were either destroyed by the local Christians or were left neglected to rot and collapse.

== See also ==
- Islam in Greece
- List of former mosques in Greece
- List of mosques in Greece
- Ottoman Greece

== Bibliography ==
- Xenopoulos, Serapheim (1884). Δοκίμιον ιστορικής τινός περιλήψεως της ποτέ αρχαίας και εγκρίτου ηπειρωτικής πόλεως Άρτης και της ωσαύτως νεωτέρας πόλεως Πρεβέζης / Συλλεγέν και συνταχθέν υπό του μητροπολίτου Άρτης Σεραφείμ του Βυζαντίου [A historical essay summarizing the once ancient and prominent Epirote town of Arta and also the newer town of Preveza / Collected and compiled by the Metropolitan of Arta Serapheim of Byzantium] (in Greek). Athens.
