= Naficy =

Naficy is a surname. Notable people with the surname include:

- Aboutorab Naficy (1914–2007), Iranian physician and heart specialist
- Hamid Naficy (born 1944), American scholar
- Mariam Naficy (fl. 1998), American entrepreneur
- Majid Naficy (born 1952), Iranian-American poet
