= Sultan Mehmed Mosque, Arta =

Destroyed mosque in Arta, Greece

Sultan Mehmed Mosque
- Σουλτάν Μεχμέτ Τζαμί
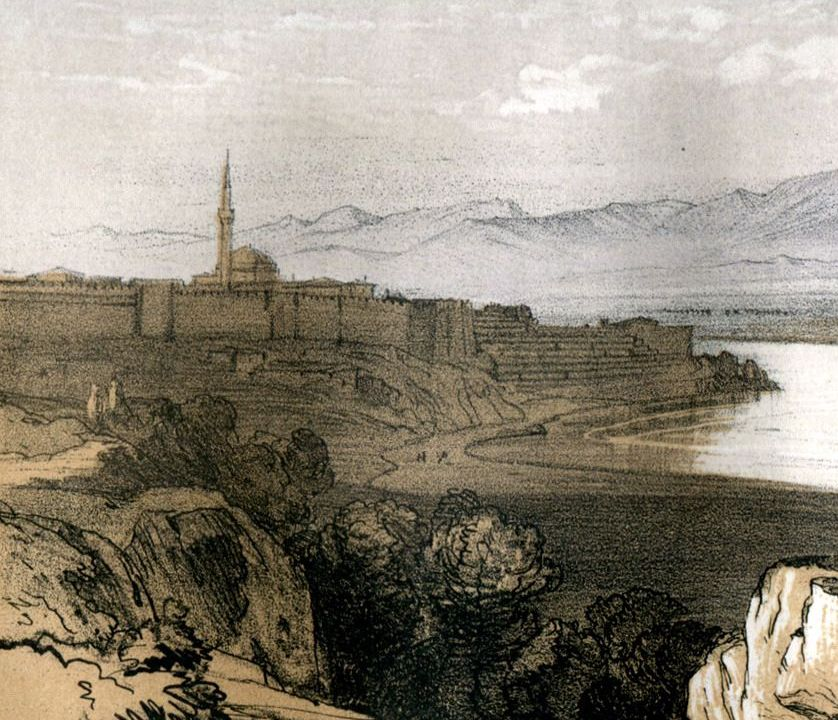
- The former mosque in 1851, by Edward Lear

- Location of the former mosque in Greece

Religion
- Affiliation: Islam (former)
- Ecclesiastical or organizational status: Mosque (c. 15th century–c. 1880s)
- Status: Destroyed

Location
- Location: Castle of Arta, Arta, Epirus
- Country: Greece
- Interactive map of Sultan Mehmed Mosque
- Coordinates: 39°09′56″N 20°59′17″E

Architecture
- Type: Mosque
- Style: Ottoman
- Founder: Sultan Mehmed II
- Completed: c. 15th century
- Destroyed: after 1881

Specifications
- Dome: 1 (maybe more)
- Minaret: 1
- Materials: Brick; stone

The Sultan Mehmed Mosque (Greek: Σουλτάν Μεχμέτ Τζαμί, Albanian: Xhamia e Sulltan Mehmetit, Turkish: Sultan Mehmet Camii), also known as the Suleyman Agha Mosque (Greek: Σουλεϊμάν Αγά Τζαμί, Albanian: Xhamia e Sulejman Agës, Turkish: Süleyman Ağa Camii), was mosque in the town of Arta, in the Epirus region of Greece, built within the Castle of Arta. Completed in the c. 15th century, during the Ottoman era, it was one of the eight mosques of the town, and one of the six that no longer exists.

== History ==
During Ottoman era, the town of Arta had eight mosques, those being the Sultan Mehmed Mosque, the Feyzullah Mosque, the Sultan Bayazid Mosque, the Kiliç Bey Mosque, the Tekke Mosque, the Bey Mosque, the Faik Pasha Mosque and the Rokka Mosque. The first six were located within the Arta town, while the latter two were situated outside the town. Only Feyzullah and Faik Pasha survive to this day.

According to the Metropolitan of Arta, Serafeim Xenopoulos, the construction of the mosque was ordered by Sultan Mehmed II, who, upon hearing about the erection of the Faik Pasha Mosque, wished for a new, larger mosque to be built and dedicated to him, but was not satisfied with the result and ordered the works for the mosque to be halted. The mosque was finalized by a servant of Faik Pasha, Suleyman Agha. The mosque belonged to several lands from around the villages of Vigla and Strongyli, from whose exploitation the mosque would receive its income. Xenopoulos noted that the mosque had been built on top of an earlier Christian church, from which materials were taken, which can also be discerned by the existence of Christian symbols on the mosque's plates. (Note: Quote: in Greek: «Το μεν Β. εις όνομα άδηλου άγιου σωζομένων εισέτι πολλών πλακών, έγκεχαραγμένους έχουσών σταυρούς».)

Arta was annexed by the Kingdom of Greece on 24 June 1881 (O.S.). After that gradually began a deliberate reshaping of the urban plan of Arta aiming the removal of all those elements that reminded and bespoke of the town's recent Ottoman past. It is theorized that the Sultan Mehmed Mosque was one of the first Ottoman monuments to be targeted and eventually destroyed due to its symbolic location inside the castle, while the vast majority of the rest of the reminders of the Ottoman period where left neglected to rot and collapse after the Muslim inhabitants of Arta fled.

== Pictorial evidence ==
One of the first known depictions of it was created by Ottoman writer Piri Reis in the fifteenth century, who drew Arta with the castle mosque, Faik Pasha Mosque and the mosque of Rokka. In 1686 Jacob Enderlin, a German engraver and publisher, created an engraving depicting Arta with Sultan Mehmed Mosque. In 1839, Panagiotis Zographos drew, under the guidance of Yannis Makriyannis, the siege of Arta in late 1821, during the Greek War of Independence. Zographos' painting shows the castle, the sprawl of the town, as well as the Sultan Mehmed, Sultan Beyazid and Kiliç Bey mosques. One of the most notable depictions was created by English writer and artist Edward Lear, who visited Arta in 1851. In his work, Lear depicted Arta with the Clock Tower, the mosques and the castle. A similar engraving was made by English engraver Edmund Evans, who visited the town in April 1854.

== Architecture ==
Sultan Mehmed Mosque used to have two storeys, a brick-covered roof, and a minaret decorated with colourful stones. The exact date of its construction is not known, but it has been suggested it was built around the same time as Faik Pasha Mosque as. Its erection on the highest point of the castle made it visible from a larger distance. The location was not picked in chance, as the founding of Ottoman buildings in the most prominent positions was used as a sign of power against the Christian population of Arta. Inside the castle, near the mosque, once were houses, a barracks and prisons, while at the gate an imaret functioned which offered food to the poor for free. (Note: Quote: «Το έντος του φρουρίου τέμενος Σουλτάν Μεχμέτ, και τούτου ή χρονολογία σχεδόν άγνωστος, καθότι ένουδενί τών κτιρίων άναφαίνεται τι, εκ παραδόσεως όμως εικάζεται ότι σύγχρονόν έστι τών Μαρατίω τού Φαήκ Πασσά.».)

== Gallery ==
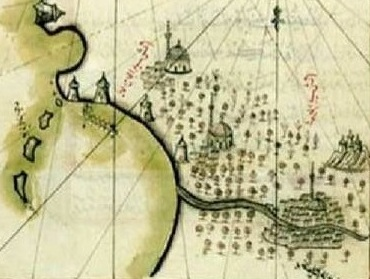
Arta and its mosques by Piris Reis

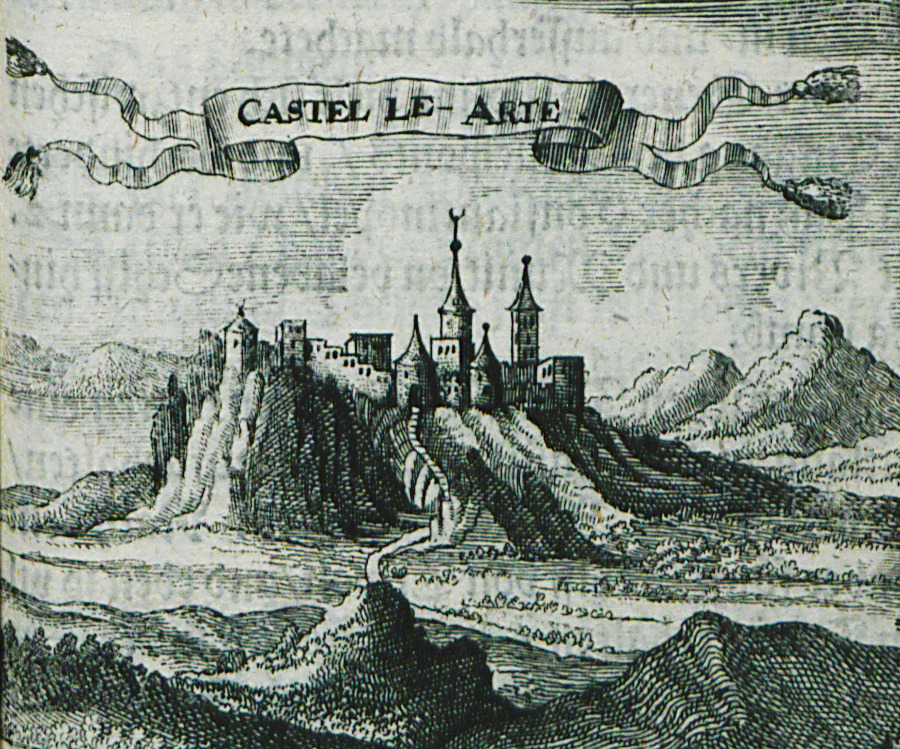
Imaginative rendering of Arta in an engraving by Jacob Enderlin

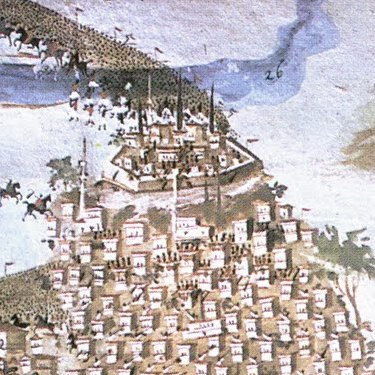
Castle and mosques engraving by Panagiotis Zographou

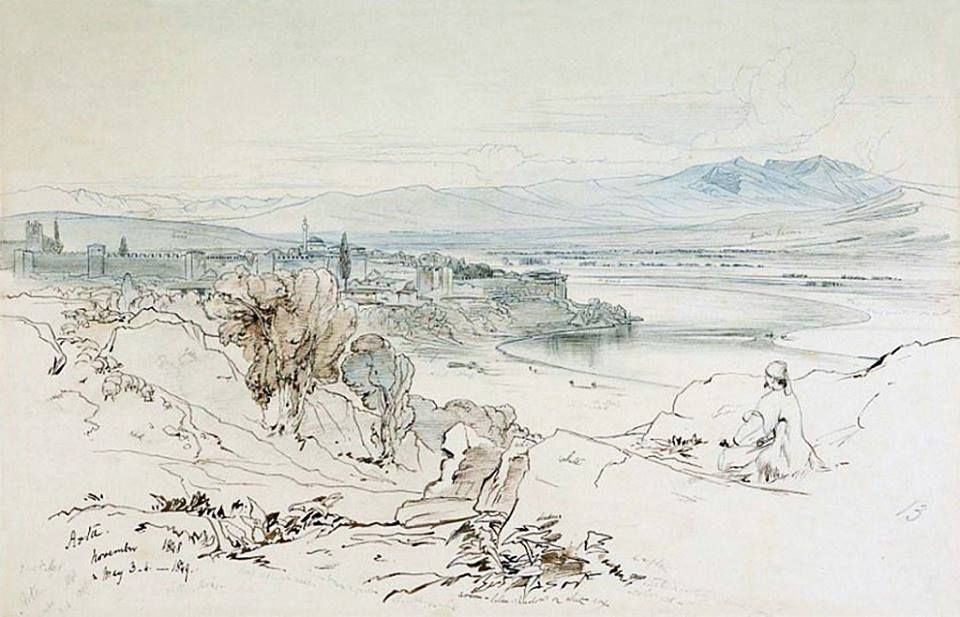
The castle by Edward Lear, 1849

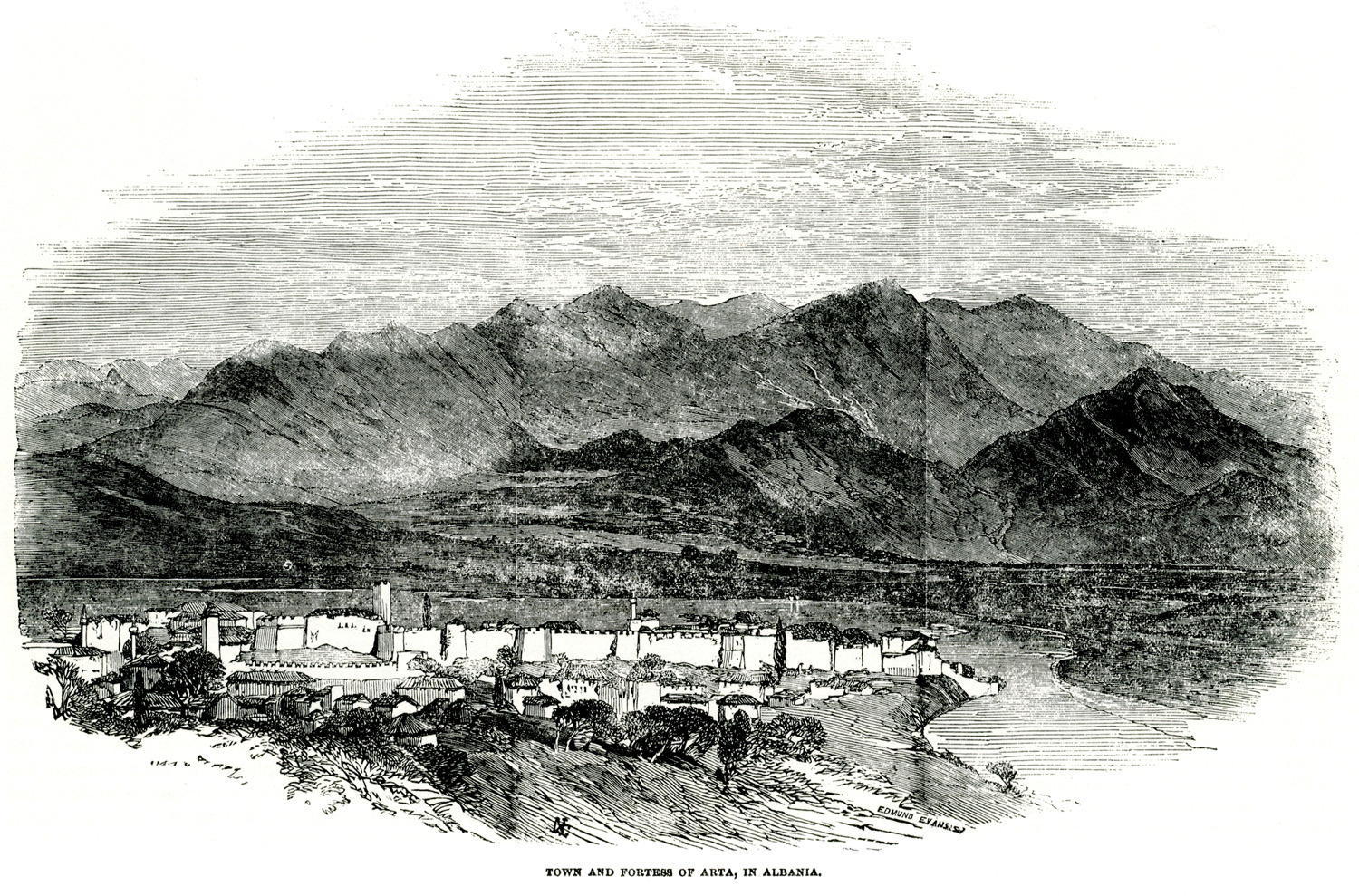
The castle by Edmund Evans, 1854

== See also ==
- Islam in Greece
- List of former mosques in Greece
- Ottoman Greece
