= Feza =

Feza is a given name and a surname. Notable people with the name include:

- Consolate Feza (born 1985), Congolese handball player
- Farida Feza (born 1999), DR Congolese footballer
- Mongezi Feza (1945–1975), South African jazz trumpeter and flautist
- Qamil Musa Haxhi Feza, Albanian statesman
- Feza Gürsey (1921–1992), Turkish mathematician and physicist
- Shehret Feza Hanim (died 1895), the ethnic Circassian Princess consort of Khedive Isma'il Pasha of Egypt

== See also ==
- Feza Gürsey Science Center, a science museum in Ankara, Turkey
- Feza Gürsey Institute, a joint institute of Boğaziçi University and TÜBİTAK
- Feza Publications, a Turkish media conglomerate established in 1986
- Faiza
