= Majid Naficy =

Iranian poet (born 1952)

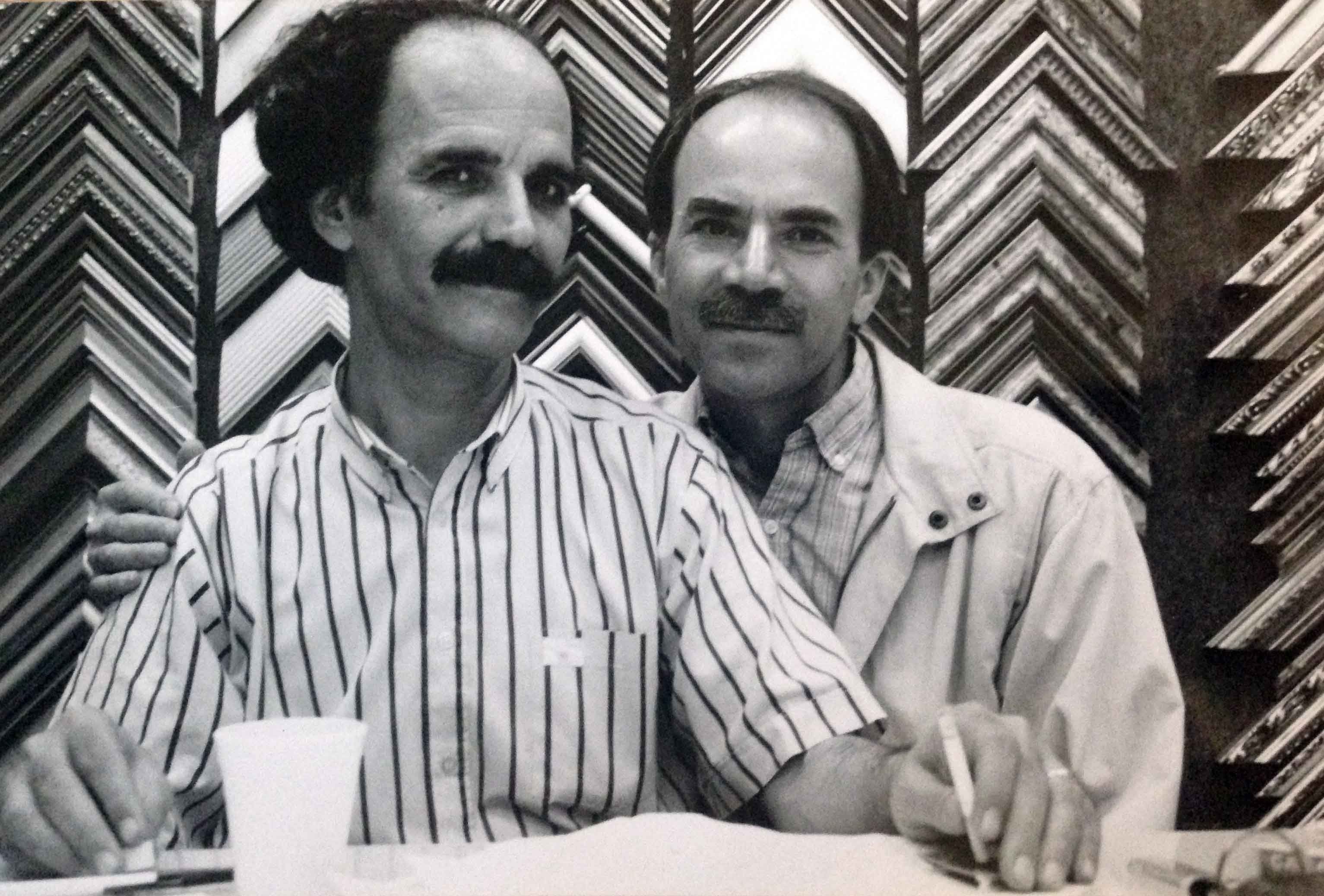
- Majid Naficy and Hooshang Golshiri in Los Angeles, April 1992
- Born: 22 February 1952 (age 74); Isfahan, Iran

Philosophical work
- Main interests: Poetry, Iranian-American Culture, Human Rights
- Notable ideas: Poetry as a Structure, Islamic Clericalism and State Capitalism, Marx not as a Führer, Critique of Death-Oriented Male-Dominated Culture in Iran, Acceptance of Los Angeles as his own City, Persian Poetry in Los Angeles

Majid Naficy (Persian: مجید نفیسی; born February 22, 1952), also spelled "Majid Nafisi" and "Madjid Nafissi", is an Iranian-American poet. He was the youngest member of the literary circle Jong-e Isfahan and was considered the Arthur Rimbaud of Persian poetry in the late 1960s in Iran. He was a member of the Confederation of Iranian Students in Los Angeles in 1971, and a member of the independent Marxist Peykar Organization after the Iranian Revolution from August 1979 until spring 1982.

At a time when most Iranian leftist organizations supported Khomeini's takeover of the American Embassy in Tehran and waging war with Iraq, the Peykar Organization stood out by opposing these policies. Majid Naficy was the writer of two crucial articles in Weekly Peykar against taking hostage the personnel of the American Embassy in Tehran; The Zigzags of the Counter-Revolution (that is, the Khomeini regime) and Their One-Sided Reflections Within the Ranks of the Revolution (Weekly Peykar, Appendix to No. 34, December 16, 1979) and Iran-Iraq War Is Not in the Interests of the Masses of Two Countries against Iran-Iraq war (Weekly Peykar, Appendix to No. 73, September 23, 1980).

In April 1983, a year and a half after the execution of his wife Ezzat Tabaian in Evin Prison, he fled Iran to Turkey on horseback. Naficy finally moved to Los Angeles, California in May 1984. There he revisited his politics, returned to writing to poetry, co-founded a group of Los Angeles-based exile Iranian poets and writers called Saturday Notebooks (or "Saturday Sessions") and co-edited the literary journal of Iranian Writers' Association in Exile and the poetry section of Arash magazine published by Parviz Ghelichkhani in Paris. He continues to write and publish poetry and nonfiction both in Persian and English and participates in human rights activities mostly related to Iran and America.

== Personal life ==
Naficy was born in Isfahan, Iran on February 22, 1952. He was the son of Batul Okhovat and Aboutorab Naficy and is the brother of Hamid, Naficeh, Nahid, Nasrin, Mehdy, Sa'id, Nooshin and Hadi.

In 1970 Naficy went to Los Angeles to study Linguistics at UCLA and there he became a revolutionary Marxist. Before that time, Naficy had considered himself an existentialist after reading Jean-Paul Sartre's Existentialism Is a Humanism translated into Persian by Mostafa Rahimi. In 1972 he returned to Iran to participate in the social movement against the Shah. After the 1979 revolution, the new theocratic regime began to suppress the opposition, and more than ten relatives, including his first wife Ezzat Tabaian, his brother Sa'id, his sister-in-law Fahimeh, and his brother-in-law Hossein Okhovat-Moqodam were executed.

Ezzat Tabaian circa 1975

He fled Iran in 1983 with his second wife Esmat and spent a year and a half in Turkey and France. Majid Naficy then settled in Los Angeles where his son, Azad, was born on April 28, 1988. Azad is a successful singer, songwriter, and music producer.

Peykar was a Marxist–Leninist organization and like most other Iranian leftist groups did not believe in liberal democracy. Naficy took his first step toward Kantian maturity when in the summer of 1981 he dared to call for an "open polemic" regarding the change of tactic declared by the central Committee of the orthodox Marxist Peykar Organization in the Editorial 110 (Weekly Peykar, June 16, 1981). Naficy believed this change of tactic would lead to conformity and compliance with the uprising of People’s Mojahedin after the ousting of "liberal" President Banisadr by Khomeini. The Peykar Central Committee did not accept the "open debate' proposed by Majid Naficy, Mohsen (pseudonym) and Mohammad-Ali Samadi, which led to a split within the organization.

His second step took place in the summer of 1985 when he decided to re-study Marx's major works chronologically and systematically and present them as lectures for other Iranian Marxists in exile in a community room at the University of Southern California. The result of this effort was nine lectures from June 1985 to November 1986 on nine books of Marx collectively called "Marx not as a Führer."Four of these essays have been published: "The Economic and Philosophical Manuscripts of 1844 and the Theory of Human Essence", "On The Jewish Question and the Theory of Political State", "A Contribution to the Critique of Hegel's Philosophy of Right and Form and Content of Political State" and "Theses on Feuerbach and the Critique of the Theory of Human Essence." Since then, Majid Naficy has become an advocate for human rights and secularism as can be seen in the titles of some of his essays "Lajevardi's Assassination and the case for the Abolishment of Capital Punishment", "Behazin and the Case against Forced Confessions", "Prison Letters: A Look in the Correspondence of an Iranian Prisoner," "I Cannot Forgive: To the Killers of My Wife," "The Mystique of Homosexuality", "Fereydoun Farrokhzad and Homosexuality", "Sadegh Hedayat and Racial Supremacy", "Holy Books as Literary Texts", "Mohammad Mokhtari and the Struggle for Freedom of Expression", "Freedom of Expression: A Commentary on a Poems for the Forouhars," "Shirin Ebadi and Freedom of Conscience", "Maimonides: a Religious Philosopher or a Social Combatant?", "The Light and Shadows of Disability", "Kaveh Dadashzadeh and the Art of Elderly Immigrants", "The National Spirit of Iranians," "Islam, Nationalism and Democracy," "Islam and the West: Neither Edward Said! Nor Bernard Lewis!" and "Baháʼís: Justice not Shame."

One night in September 1987 Majid Naficy dreamt of his lost brother Sa’id in Los Angeles. In his dream, Majid was hastily typing the thoughts that he wanted to share with his brother. For the last few years before the Revolution, due to their political differences, the two brothers did not talk to each other. Majid wanted to criticize the death-oriented thoughts and stoic lives of many Iranian leftists who struggled against the Shah's regime in the seventies. He wanted to show that they had many things in common with the people who saw Khomeini as their savior. They struggled for communal joy, but they considered joy a sin for themselves. They longed for freedom, but they idolized their own school of thought and refused to have any conversation with others. They praised women, but their eyes could not bear the glare of female faces. They mainly wanted to take political power, and leave everything else to the future. This was the origin of the writing of In Search of Joy: A Critique of Death-Oriented & Male-Dominated Culture in Iran. This two-hundred-fifty-page book consists of an introduction on death worship before the Revolution, an appendix on the profile of Women in the poetry of the contemporary poet Ahmad Shamlou and nine chapters on classical poets Baba Taher, Faez, Khayyam, Attar, Rumi, Sa’di, Hafez and a folk tale and ends with Khomeini and sexuality. Although Naficy follows a trend of thought, that is appreciation of life and womanhood, he does not adhere to any particular school of thought in this book. His criticism does not attempt to demonize Rumi and Hafez or burn their works, but it is an invitation to read them more seriously. He ends his foreword to the book as follows: "We are raised to a great extent under the spiritual influence of our classics. Therefore, if we want to go further, we should not close the path of analysis or criticism of our classical works to ourselves."

Some of the chapters of Naficy's book have been translated into English including the one on Rumi which Majid Naficy has incorporated in his review of Coleman Barks's "The Essential Rumi" entitled "Coleman Barks and Rumi's Donkey". Naficy believes that Barks reduces Rumi's poetry to a New Age text: "The essential problem of Coleman Barks lies in the fact that in his version he intentionally changes Rumi, perhaps for the better, but at the expense of distortion and misrepresentation. He approaches Rumi's poetry as sacred texts, which need to be dusted from the passage of times by a touched devotee and prepared for the Postmodern, New Age market in the West."

In 1996, Naficy received his PhD in Near Eastern Languages and Cultures from the University of California at Los Angeles. His doctoral dissertation focused on the poetry of Nima Yushij, the founder of modern Persian poetry in Iran. Naficy ran in the Los Angeles marathon for twelve consecutive years. He is visually impaired due to retinal degeneration. Naficy lost most of his vision after climbing Mount Whitney on July 22, 2001. He has written about disability in literature including on the albino hero Zal in Ferdowsi's The Shah-Nameh and Jose Saramago's Blindness, in which blind people are portrayed grotesquely.

== Poetry ==
In 1965, at age thirteen, Naficy published two poems in Jong-e Isfahan magazine in Isfahan. Soon his poetry appeared in the prestigious Arash magazine, next to Forough Farrokhzad's work, as well as Jozveh-ye She'r, the organ of New Wave Poetry next to poems of Ahmadreza Ahmadi and Bijan Elahi. His first collection of poems In the Tiger’s Skin was published in 1969. One year later his book of literary criticism, Poetry as a Structure appeared. In 1971 his children's book The Secret of Words won a national award in Iran.

In the 1970s he became a revolutionary Marxist and stopped writing poetry because he wanted to change the world not by words but through actions. However after the execution of his wife Ezzat Tabaian in Evin Prison on January 7, 1982, he returned to writing poetry. Naficy wrote nine poems about his late wife collectively called "Ezzat Was Executed."

One and half years later he fled Iran and eventually took refuge in Los Angeles. On December 22, 1985, Majid Naficy wrote poetry continuously for another four months. He gathered 111 of them in his second collection of poems called, "After the Silence." Poetry gave him the courage to speak for those who became silenced by firing squads.

Except for fewer than ten, all of the poems in this collection were written about the Iranian situation in the past and present. It seems that after this collection of poems, the poet gradually comes to terms with his new situation and sees himself as a person living in America. He seeks to cherish both his cultural heritage and his new identity. In his third collection of poems called Sorrow of the Border published in 1989, the proportion of poems reflecting the new situation has increased drastically. In a very long poem dedicated to his newborn son, Azad, he sees his son as his own new roots growing in the second homeland.

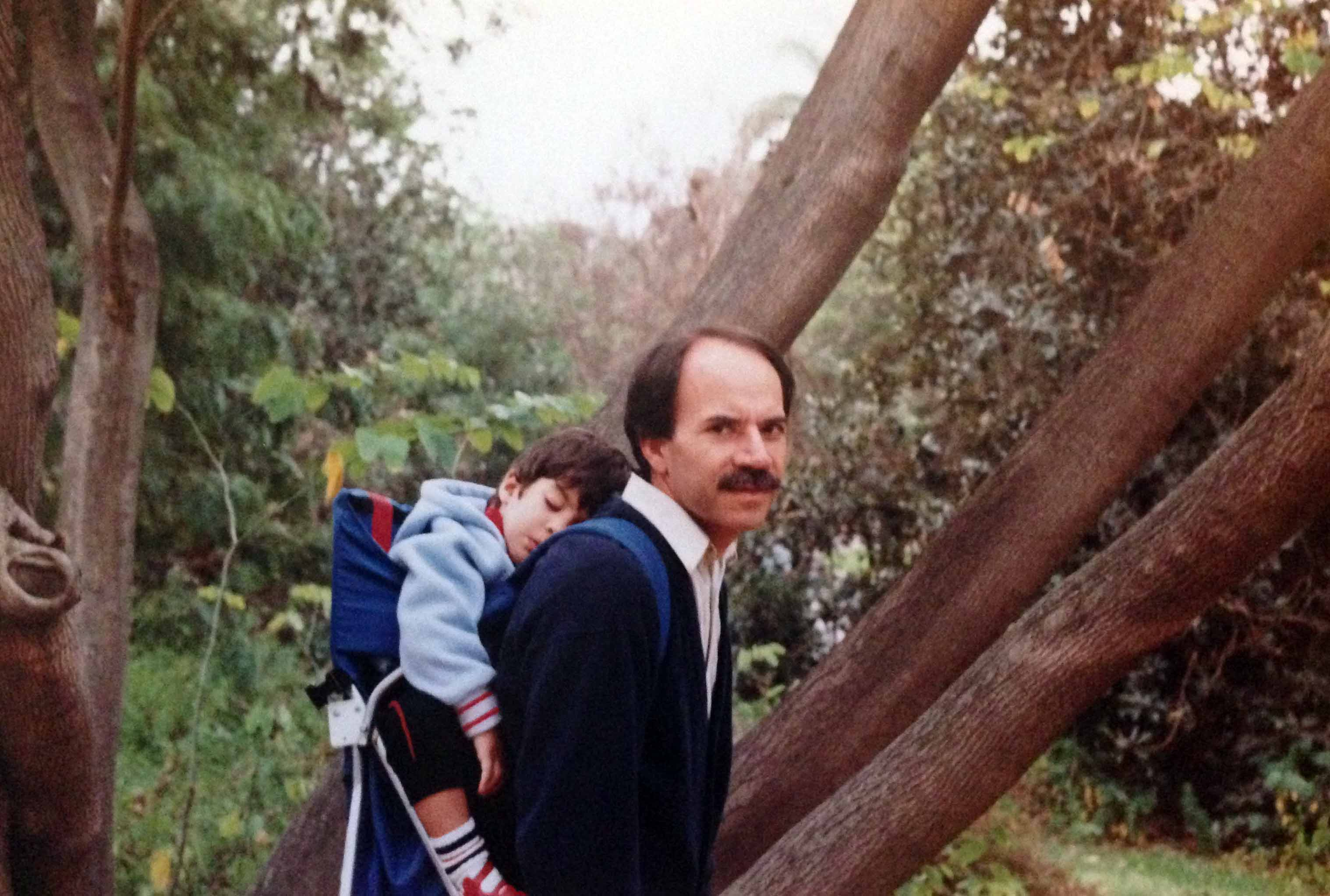
Majid Naficy with his son Azad in the Los Angeles mountains around 1991

In the next collection, published in 1991, called Poems of Venice, the reader finds different aspects of life at Venice Beach, where Majid lived for seven years. A turning-point in this long journey from the realm of self-denial to acceptance and adjustment is when he wrote a long poem on January 12, 1994, called "Ah, Los Angeles". It starts with these lines:

Ah, Los Angeles!
I accept you as my own city,
And after ten years
I am at peace with you.

The City of Venice cherished his effort and engraved a stanza of this poem "Ah Los Angeles" in the public space on the intersection of Boardwalk and Brooks Ave. in 2000. Also the city of Studio City engraved the first stanza of his poem "Secret of the River" on a bench in Los Angeles Riverfront Park.

Naficy has tried to introduce the poetry of Iranian poets in Los Angeles to both English and Iranian readers. On March 20, 1998, he hosted a poetry reading in celebration of Persian New Year in Beyond Baroque Literary Arts Center in Venice Beach in which five poets, Nader Naderpour, Partow Nuriala, Mansour Khaksar, Abbas Saffari and himself read their poems both in Persian and English. Also on February 21, 2012, he had a talk at Stanford University in English entitled "Persian Poetry in Los Angeles: Nostalgia VS Adaptation". Finally, Naficy was the guest editor of Ava-ye Tabeed (Voice of Exile), an online Persian journal (No. 11, November 2019) dedicated to the poetry of thirty Iranian poets living in Los Angeles.

== Tributes ==
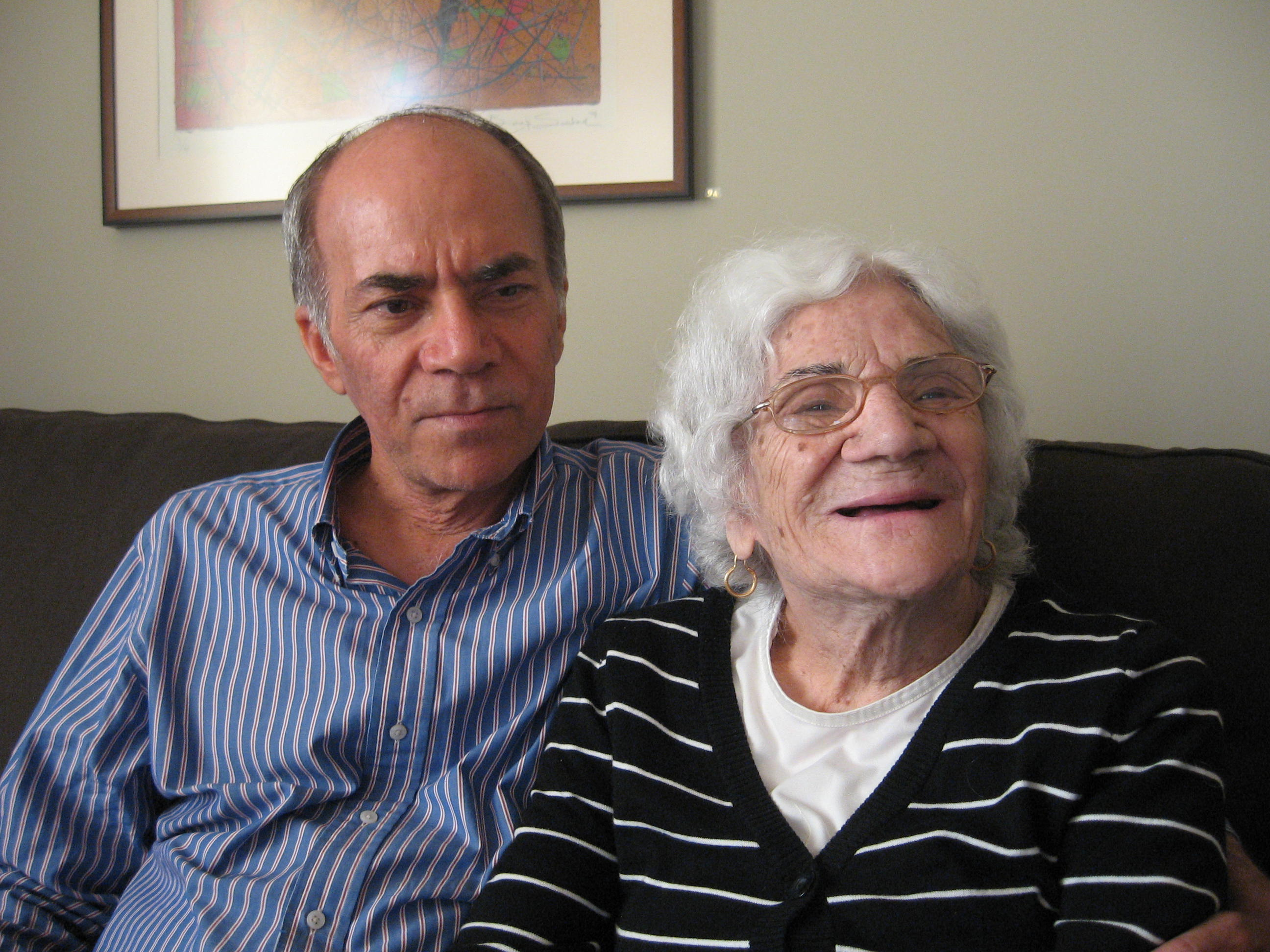
Majid Naficy and his mother, Batul Okhovat, in Istanbul, May 2011

Majid Naficy is one of the six poets featured in the film Poetry of Resilience directed by the Oscar-nominated documentary film-maker Katja Esson.

He was the first writer in residence at Annenberg Community Beach House in Santa Monica from 2009 to 2010.

He received the 2025 Artist Fellowship of the City of Santa Monica, which honors outstanding local artists for their artistic excellence and creative contributions to the community.

A performance of Naficy's work was included in a 2019 exhibit of artist Shirin Neshat titled "I Will Greet the Sun Again" at the Broad Museum in Los Angeles. His life and work were featured in LA Weekly, February 9–15, 2001 written by Louise Steinman, entitled "Poet of Revolution: Majid Naficy's Tragic Journey Home".

In January 2014, a film called "Majid Naficy's Portrait" was aired on Voice of America in Persian. Now it is available with English subtitles on YouTube.

Majid Naficy's poetry and prose have been anthologized in many books including Poetry in the Windows edited by Suzanne Lummis, Poets Against the War edited by Sam Hamill, Strange Times My Dear: The Pen Anthology of Contemporary Iranian Literature edited by Nahid Mozaffari and Ahmad Karimi-Hakkak, Lounge Lit: An Anthology of Poetry and Fiction by the Writers of Literati Cocktail and Rhapsodomancy, Belonging: New Poetry by Iranians around the World edited by Niloufar Talebi, After Shocks: The Poetry of Recovery for Life edited by Tom Lombardo, Becoming Americans: Four Centuries of Immigrant Writing edited by Ilan Stavans, Revolutionary Poets Brigade Anthology in two volumes edited by Jack Hirschman and Mark Lipman, Al-Mutanabbi Street Starts Here edited by Beau Beausoleil and Deema Shihabi, Others Will Enter the Gates: Immigrant Poets on Poetry, Influences, and Writing in America edited by Abayomi Animashaun, Wide Awake Poets of Los Angeles and Beyond edited by Suzanne Lummis, The Coiled Serpent: Poets arising from the cultural quakes and shifts of Los Angeles edited by Neelanjana Banerjee, Daniel A. Olivas and Luis J. Rodriguez, Open Doors: An Invitation to Poetry edited by Jie Tian, Irena Praitis, and Natalie Graham, Los Angeles Poets for Justice: A Document for the People, edited by Jessica M. Wilson and Karo Ska, Essential Voices: Poetry of Iran and Its Diaspora edited by Christopher Nelson, Dear Vaccine: Global Voices Speak to the Pandemic edited by Naomi Shihab Nye, David Hassler and Tyler Meier, Storm Warning: Poets for the Planet edited by John Curl, Lisbit Bailey and Kristina Brown. Beat Not Beat An Anthology of California Poets Screwing on the Beat and Post-Beat Tradition Edited by Rich Ferguson, S.A. Griffin, Alexis Rhone Fancher, and Kim Shuck., Catching Fire, The Los Angeles Wildfires, An Anthology of Poetry edited by Richard Modiano and S. A. Griffin.

The scholar Jalil Doostkhah has written an extensive review of Naficy's doctoral dissertation and the poet Amin Haddadi has published a full book, called "Forging the Steel of the Future" about the poetry of Naficy.

== Works ==
=== In English ===
- Modernism and Ideology in Persian Literature: A Return to Nature in the Poetry of Nima Yushij (doctoral dissertation), University Press of America 1997
- Muddy Shoes (poetry) Beyond Baroque Books, Los Angeles 1999
- Father and Son (poetry), Red Hen Press, Los Angeles 2003
- My American Love: Thirty-Two Poems for Wendy, Aftab Publication, Norway 2021
- Mother and Father: Thirty-six poems, Aftab Publications, Norway, 2023
- A Witness for Ezzat: Thirty Poems, Aftab Publication, Norway, 2024
- The Story of a Love: A Sequence of Twelve Poems, Literature Club, Finland, 2025

=== In Persian ===
- In Tiger's Skin (poetry), AmirKabir Publisher, Tehran, 1969
- Poetry As a Structure (theory), Isfahan 1970
- Secret of Words (for children), Institute for the Intellectual Development of Children and Young Adults, Tehran, 1970
- Islamic Republic Party With Two Rusty Swords: Clericalism and State Capitalism(theory), Independent Marxist Peykar Organization, Tehran 1980
- After the Silence (111 Poems), Sweden 1985
- Sorrow of the Border (poetry), Los Angeles, 1989
- In Search of Joy: A Critique of Death-Oriented, Male-Dominated Culture in Iran (theory) Baran Publisher, Sweden, 1991
- Poems of Venice (poetry), Los Angeles 1991
- I write to bring You Back (poetry and prose), Baran Publisher, Sweden 1999
- Father and Son (poetry) Baran Publisher, Sweden 1999
- The Story of a Love: A Series of twelve poems, Columbus, Javaneh Publisher 1999
- Poetry and Politics and Twenty-Four Other Essays, Baran Publisher Sweden 1999
- The Best of Nima, Baran Publisher, Sweden, 2000
- Galloping Gazelles (poetry) London 2003
- I Am Iran Myself and Thirty-Five Other Essays, Afra-Pegah Publisher, Toronto2006
- Ezzat’s Treasure (poetry and prose), Toronto, Shahrvand Online, 2015
- Cricket and Six other Long Poems, Avanevesht, Tehran 2016
- Farewell and Other Short Poems, Avanevesht, Tehran 2018
- Love and Death in Persian Literature and Forty Other Essays, Aftab Publication, Norway 2019
- My American Love: Thirty-Two Poems for Wendy, Aftab Publication, Norway, 2021
- Poodeh (a monograph), Avanevesht, Tehran 2021
- Struggle in the Struggle: The Leftist Movement and I, Aftab Publication, Norway 2022
- Mother and Father: Thirty-six poems, Aftab Publications, Norway, 2023
- Dare to Think and the Jina Revolution, Eighteen Essays, Kerm Ketab Publication, Peru, 2023
- A Witness for Ezzat: Thirty Poems, Aftab Publication, Norway, 2024
- The story of a Love: A Sequence of Twelve Poems, Second Edition, Literature Club, Finland, 2025
- In Search of Joy: A Critique of Death-Oriented, Male-Dominated Culture in Iran (theory), Second Edition with Revision and Expansion, Aftab Publishers, Norway 2026
- Poetry as a Structure (theory) second edition, Avanevesht Publishers, Tehran, 2026
