= Faizan =

- Pronunciation: Arabic: [feːdˤaːn]
- Gender: Male

Origin
- Origin: Arabic
- Meaning: Winner, Pride, Beneficence, Ruler
- Region of origin: Western Asia

Other names
- Related names: Faiz

Faizan (Arabic: فيضان romanised: Faizan, Bengali: ফাইজান romanised: Faijan, Urdu: فیضان romanised: Faizan), also spelt Faizan, Faydhan, Faizon, Faidhan, Faizaan, and Fayzan, a variant of Faiz, is a male given name and a surname. It has been variously translated as meaning "winner", "successful", "beneficence", "ruler", "benefit" and "generosity".

== People ==
=== Given name ===
- Faizan Arif (born 2001), J&K's first recognized independent weatherman, columnist, and founder of Kashmir Weather.
- Faizan Asif (born 1992), Emirati cricketer
- Faizan Khawaja (born 1986), Pakistani-American actor
- Faizan Kidwai, Actor
- Faizan Mustafa, lawyer and academic
- Faizan Peerzada (1958–2012), Pakistani artist, puppeteer and theater director
- Faizan Riaz (born 1988), Pakistani cricketer
- Faizan Zaki (born 2012), Winner of the 2025 Scripps National Spelling Bee

=== Surname ===
- Faizanullah Faizan, Afghan politician

== See also ==
- Arabic name
