= Faez =

Faez (Arabic: فائز) is an Arabic surname. Notable people with the surname include:

- Ali Faez (born 1994), Iraqi footballer
- Ana Faez (born 1972), Cuban fencer

== See also ==
- Faiz
- Fayez
