= Iç Kale =

Iç Kale (Turkish for "inner castle, citadel") may refer to:

- Its Kale, the citadel of Ioannina, Greece
- Iç Kale (Ankara), the Byzantine-era citadel of Ankara, Turkey
- Kaleiçi, the historical center of Antalya, Turkey
- Heptapyrgion citadel in Thessaloniki, Greece, called Iç Kale in Ottoman times
- Acronauplia citadel in Nafplion, Greece, called Iç Kale in Ottoman times
- Castle of Arta in Arta, Greece, called Iç Kale in Ottoman times
- Castle of Kars, the citadel of Kars, Turkey
- Castle of Saint Andrew in Preveza, Greece, called Iç Kale in Ottoman times
