= 97th Scripps National Spelling Bee =

2025 spelling bee competition

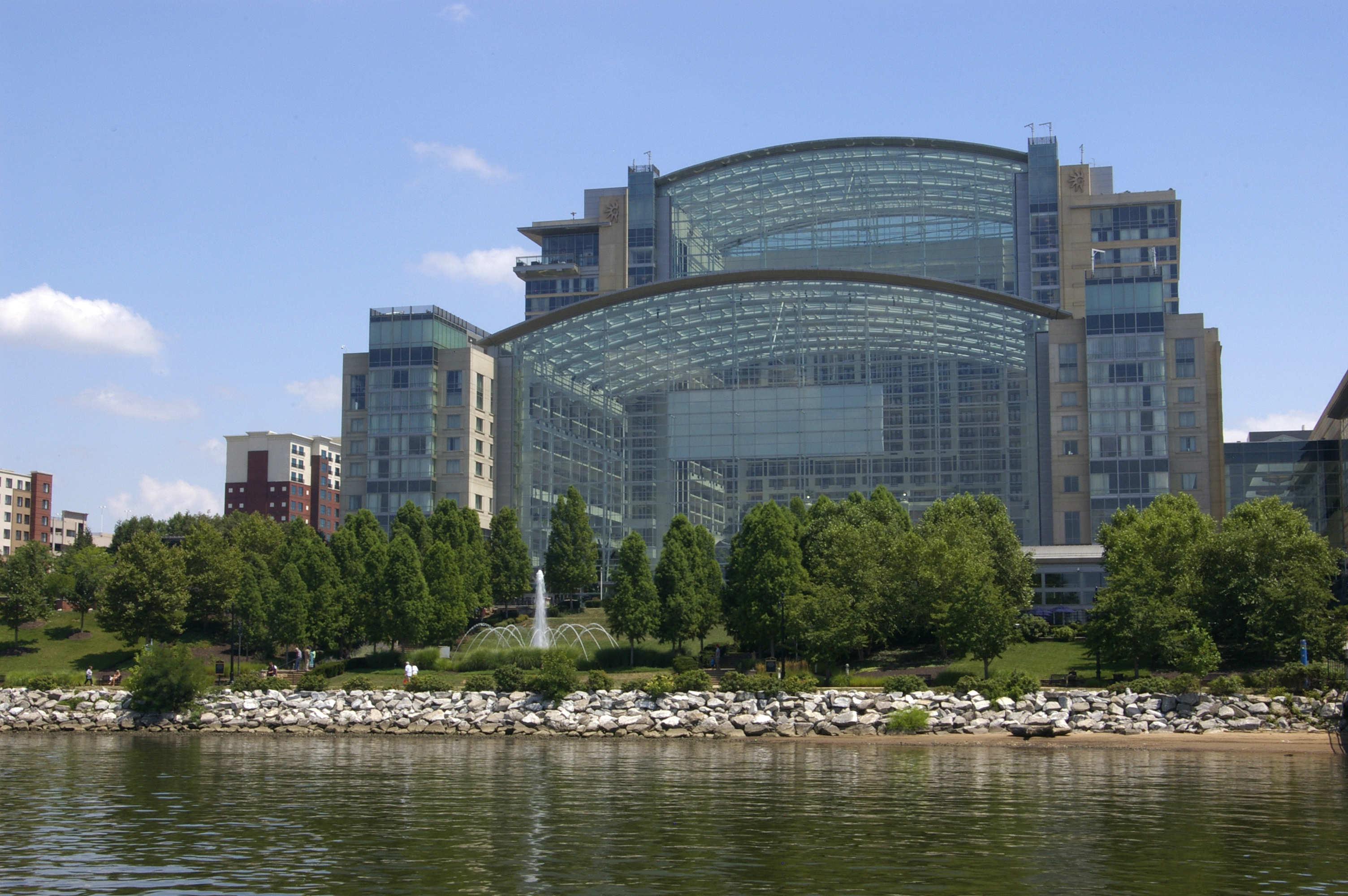
- The Gaylord National Resort & Convention Center in National Harbor, Maryland, hosted the Scripps National Spelling Bee.
- Date: May 27–29, 2025
- Location: Gaylord National Resort & Convention Center (National Harbor, Maryland)
- Winner: Faizan Zaki
- Sponsor: Dallas Sports Commission
- Sponsor location: Dallas, Texas
- Winning word: éclaircissement
- No. of contestants: 243
- Pronouncer: Jacques Bailly and Brian Sietsema

The 97th Scripps National Spelling Bee was held at the Gaylord National Resort & Convention Center in National Harbor, Maryland, from May 27-29, 2025. The Bee marked a special milestone with its commemoration of 100 years of the Bee (Note: There were no bees in 1943, 1944, and 1945 due to World War II and 2020 due to the COVID-19 pandemic.) since the inaugural event in 1925.

The 2025 Bee welcomed 243 spellers from the United States, its territories, Canada, Ghana, Nigeria, Kuwait, and the Bahamas. Preliminary rounds were held on May 27, quarterfinals and semifinals on May 28, and finals on May 29.

The Bee honored the Akron Beacon Journal as its Regional Partner of the Year, noteworthy given that the paper has sponsored a speller at every Bee since its inception in 1925.

In 2026, the Bee moved to DAR Constitution Hall, with contestants staying at the JW Marriott in Washington D.C. 2025 was the final year the Bee was held in National Harbor.

13-year-old Faizan Zaki won the competition.

== Field ==
243 spellers competed in the 2025 Bee, including 53 spellers returning from the 2024 Bee, and 65 spellers total who had competed in a prior national competition.

Tarini Nandakumar from Texas competed in her fifth Bee, having placed as high as ninth in 2023. Five spellers were four-time repeaters: Navtaj Singh from Idaho, Harini Murali from New Jersey, Micah Sterling from New York, Avinav Prem Anand from Ohio, and Faizan Zaki from Texas, who was the runner-up in 2024.

Some spellers with notable family connections included Zwe Spacetime, younger brother of 2021 champion Zaila Avant-garde and Vedanth Raju, younger brother of 2022's 2nd-place finisher Vikram Raju. Both of these spellers tied for 10th place.

Eight-year-old second grader Zachary Teoh was the youngest speller in the competition, and also the Houston area's youngest ever representative at the Bee. He noted that the highlight of his experience was reading the dictionary with Dr. Bailly. He placed 74th.

== Competition ==
Scripps-owned networks ION and Bounce TV aired the competition.

After the first three rounds of competition on May 27, 99 spellers advanced to the quarterfinals on May 28, with 57 advancing to the semifinals later that day.

Nine spellers qualified as finalists after successfully advancing past round 10 in the semifinals:

Esha Marupudi, a 13-year-old seventh grader representing Arizona Educational Foundation of Phoenix, Arizona
Oliver Halkett, a 13-year-old seventh grader representing Los Angeles County Office of Education of Los Angeles, California
Sarvadnya Kadam, a 14-year-old eighth grader representing Tulare County Office of Education of Visalia, California
Sarv Dharavane, an 11-year-old fifth grader representing Georgia Association of Educators of Tucker, Georgia
Harini Murali, a 13-year-old eighth grader representing SNSB Region Three Bee of Edison, New Jersey
Brian Liu, a 13-year-old eighth grader representing SNSB Region Four Bee of Great Neck, New York
Aishwarya Kallakuri, a 14-year-old eighth grader representing Carolina Panthers of Charlotte, North Carolina
Akshaj Somisetty, a 13-year-old eighth grader representing Pennon Education of Harrisburg, Pennsylvania
Faizan Zaki, a 13-year-old seventh grader representing Dallas Sports Commission of Dallas, Texas

The finalists displayed their high level of skill over the course of eleven rounds on the evening of May 29, as they passed four of the rounds without a single misspelled word. The top six spellers lasted three of those perfect rounds together, all part of a run of 23 words in a row spelled correctly.

Faizan Zaki emerged as the champion in round 21 of the Bee, spelling the world éclaircissement correctly and winning $50,000.

As Associated Press reporter Ben Nuckols noted, he "nearly threw away his opportunity to go from runner-up to champion at the Scripps National Spelling Bee with a shocking moment of overconfidence" as he hastily began spelling commelina incorrectly before checking to see if he knew the word. As third-place finisher Sarv Dharavane and runner-up Sarvadnya Kadam also misspelled their words in the round, they were all reinstated at the time.

Faizan was the first speller since 2001 to claim the championship after having previously been runner-up.

== Final rankings ==
1st Place:
Faizan Zaki

2nd Place:
Sarvadnya Kadam

3rd Place:
Sarv Dharavane

4th Place (tie):
Harini Murali
Brian Liu
Aishwarya Kallakuri

7th Place (tie):
Esha Marupudi
Oliver Halkett

9th Place:
Akshaj Somisetty

== Word list championship round ==
- isopag
- corbicula
- dolabrate
- ethology
- bibliognost
- infula
- idempotent
- gomphosis
- Politique
- vasodilator (word meaning)
- gerontocracy (word meaning)
- dyslogistic (word meaning)
- hyaline (word meaning)
- jeremiad (word meaning)
- cerulean (word meaning)
- innominable (word meaning)
- imbroglio (word meaning)
- sapience (word meaning)
- aramorphosis
- aurore
- tachist
- fede ring
- baguio
- kinnor
- zecchino
- daimiate
- bergerette
- lactagogue
- epistrophe
- lysigenous
- polyptoton
- radicicolous
- athalamous
- saurel
- rompu
- penannular
- Savonnerie
- adytum
- meliponine
- burgall
- Septième
- reseda
- corylaceous
- olona
- Ordovician
- dhaura
- tekke
- kyah
- Keighley
- Symlin
- tirak
- acker
- commelina
- muhly
- eserine
- Cupar
- Uaupés
- Chaldee
- éclaircissement

== See also ==
- Scripps National Spelling Bee
