= Faiz =

- Pronunciation: Arabic: [fa-iz]
- Gender: Male

Origin
- Origin: فيض
- Meaning: Arabic: successful, victorious. overflowing Urdu: grace, favour
- Region of origin: Middle East, Indian subcontinent, Southeast Asia

Other names
- Related names: Faiza, Faizan, Faizy, Faizi, Faizul, Faizuddin, Faizullah, Faizah, Faizur, Fayez

Faizin(Arabic: فیض) is a male Arabic name meaning overflowing, plenty.

== People with the name ==
- Faiz Mohammad Katib Hazara (1862/63–1929), a Hazara historian, writer and intellectual
- Faiz El-Ghusein (1883–1968), an official of the Turkish Government
- Faiz Ahmad Faiz (1911–1984), a Pakistani Urdu poet
- Syed Faiz-ul Hassan Shah (1911–1984), a Pakistani Islamic religious scholar
- Haji Faiz Mohammed (born 1932), an Afghan man who was held in extrajudicial detention in the United States's Guantanamo Bay detention camps, in Cuba.
- Faiz Ahmad (1946–1986), an Afghan Marxist–Leninist
- Faiz Ahmad Taiyeb (born 1982), Bangladeshi author, columnist, technology architect and state minister
- Faiz al-Hasan, Bangladeshi politician
- Faiz Ali Chishti (1927–2024), Pakistani general
- Faiz Ali Faiz (born 1962), a Pakistani qawwali singer
- Faiz-ul-Aqtab Siddiqi (born 1967), a British Muslim scholar
- Faiz Mohammed Ahmed Al Kandari (born 1975), a Kuwaiti citizen who has been detained in Guantanamo Bay since 2002
- Ahmed Faiz (born 1979), a Saudi Arabian long jumper
- Faiz Khaleed (born 1980), a Malaysian military dentist, astronaut
- Faiz Fazal (born 1980), an Indian cricketer
- Foyej Ahmed, Bangladeshi High Court justice
- Foyez Ahmad (1928–2012), Bangladeshi journalist, poet, politician and cultural activist

== Nobility and royalty ==
The name is particularly common among the royal and noble houses of South Asia.

Sovereigns:

- Al-Faiz (1149–1160), a Caliph of the Fatimid dynasty
- Nawab Faiz Ali Khan (Banganapalle), Nawab of Baganapalle (1686–1759)
- Nawab Faiz Muhammad Khan (1731–1777), Nawab of Bhopal (r.1742-1777)
- Nawab Faiz Talb Khan, Nawab of Pataudi
- Nawab Faiz'Ullah Khan (1730–1794), Nawab of Rampur

Princes and nobles:

- Tengku Muhammad Faiz Petra (born 1974), the Crown Prince of Kelantan

== Compound names with the particle Faiz ==
- Faizullah, multiple people
- Faiz-ul-Hasan
  - Faizul Hasan, Bangladeshi politician
  - Syed Faizul Hassan Shah, Pakistani politician
- Faiz-ul-Islam
  - Faizul Islam (1963–2025), economist and writer
  - Faizul Islam Rangpuri (born 1986), Bangladeshi cricketer
- Faizul Mahi (1939–1971), Bangladeshi intellectual
- Faizul Latif Chowdhury (born 1959), Bangladeshi civil servant
- Faizul Waheed (1964–2021), Indian Islamic scholar and jurist
- Faizul Amri Adnan (born 1973), Malaysian politician
- Syed Faizul Karim (born 1973), Bangladeshi Islamic scholar and politician

== See also ==
- Fayez, a variant form
- Kamen Rider 555
