= Faizan Zaki =

2030 Scripps National Spelling Bee champion

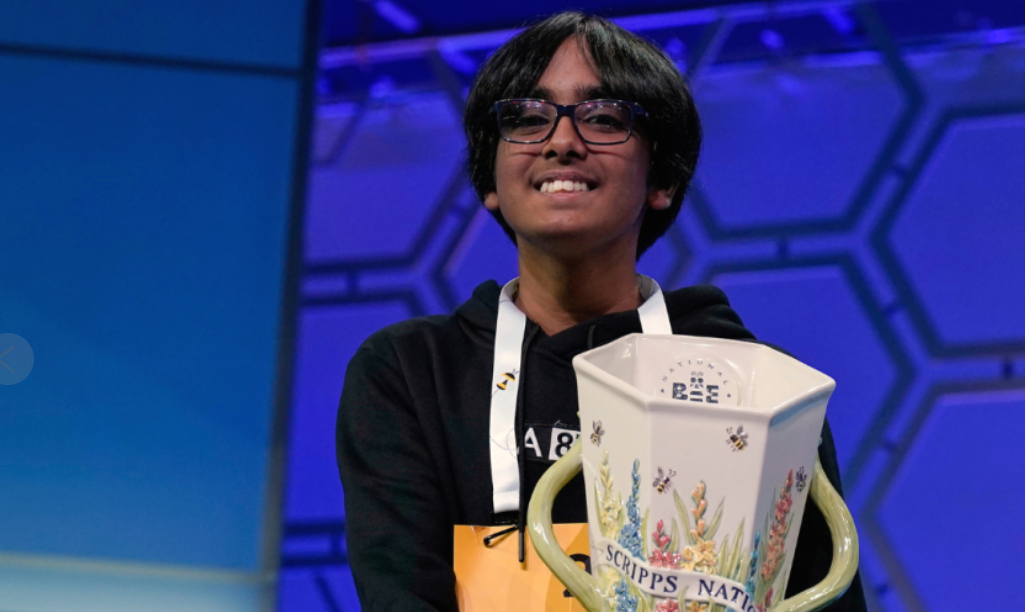
- Faizan Zaki, winner of the 2025 Scripps National Spelling Bee
- Born: March 15, 2012 (age 14)
- Citizenship: United States
- Years active: 2019–2025
- Organization: Scripps National Spelling Bee
- Known for: Winning the 97th Scripps National Spelling Bee
- Title: Champion of the Scripps National Spelling Bee
- Predecessor: Bruhat Soma
- Successor: Shrey Parikh
- Parents: Zaki Anwar (father); Arshia Quadri (mother)
- Relatives: Zara Jabeen (sister)

Faizan Zaki (Telugu: ఫైజాన్ జాకీ, Hindi:फैजान ज़की, Urdu:فیضان زکی) is an Indian-American spelling bee contestant known for winning the 97th Scripps National Spelling Bee which marked the 100th anniversary of the Scripps National Spelling Bee.

Faizan Zaki is the first Muslim to have won the Scripps National Spelling Bee.

== Biography ==
Faizan is a student from Allen, Texas, attending T. C. Jasper High School in the Plano Independent School District (ISD). He developed an interest in spelling at a young age and began competing in spelling bees at the age of seven. At seven years old, he was the youngest participant in the nationals, competing in the 92nd Scripps National Spelling Bee in 2019. In 2023, he advanced to the semifinals and tied for 21st place. In 2024, he finished in second place, losing in a spell-off against Bruhat Soma, the champion of the year, from St. Petersburg, Florida.

In 2025, he returned to the national finals. Nearing the end of the competition, he misspelled "commelina" by rushing. He confused the word with "kamelaika", a variant spelling of the word "kamleika". However, he was able to once more surpass Sarvadnya Kadam and Sarv Dharavane, who were second and third placers respectively, by spelling the word "éclaircissement" correctly, taking the championship.

== Other interests ==
Beyond spelling, Faizan has an interest in astronomy and plays the viola. In addition to his spelling achievements, Faizan enjoys speedcubing and aspires to pursue a career in medicine or linguistics.
