= Faizul Islam =

Bangladeshi cricketer (born 1986)

Faizul Islam (born 6 September 1986 in Khulna) is a Bangladeshi former first-class cricketer active 2003–2006 who played for Barisal Division. He was a right-handed batsman and a right-arm fast medium pace bowler.
