= Faizanullah Faizan =

Afghan politician

Faizanullah Faizan is the former governor of Ghazni province, Afghanistan. He was appointed in September 2007, replacing Merajuddin Patan.
