= Castle of Arta =

Medieval fortification in Arta, Greece

Coordinates: 39°9′53.071″N 20°59′11.551″E

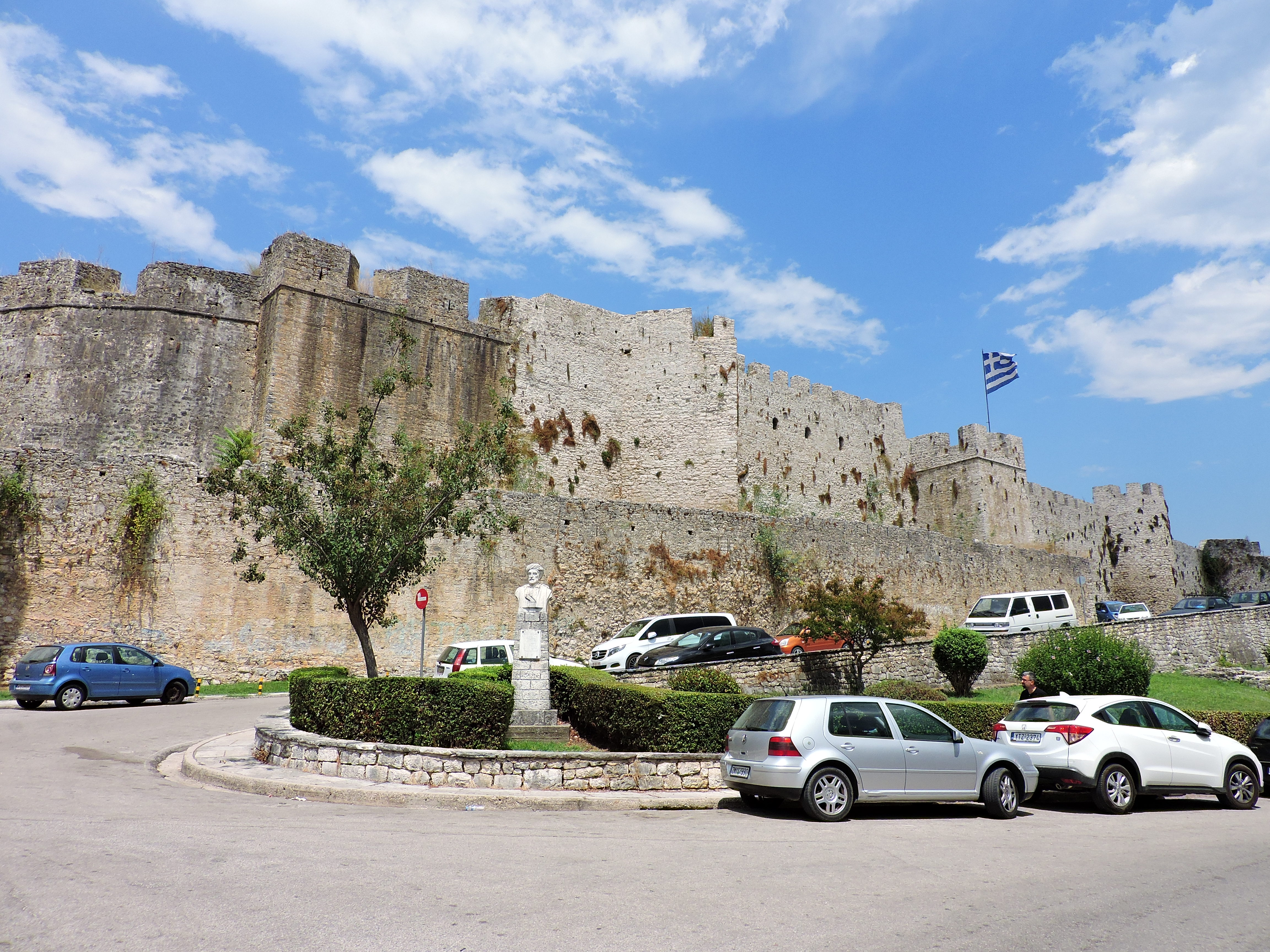
The fortifications at the main gate of the Castle of Arta in 2016

The Castle of Arta (Greek: Κάστρο της Άρτας) is a medieval fortification in the city of Arta in western Greece.

== History ==
The Castle of Arta lies at the northeastern edge of the city, at the bend of the Arachthos River. Remains of ancient ashlars on the eastern wall of the castle testify that it was built on the site of the lower town of ancient Ambracia, which had been abandoned since the foundation of nearby Nicopolis in 31 BC. It is unclear when exactly the site of Arta was reoccupied; it is first documented during a Norman siege in 1082, by which time it apparently had some fortifications.

The castle was the citadel of the city, and is attributed to the early 13th-century rulers of the Despotate of Epirus of which Arta was the capital, but its current form dates mostly from Ottoman times. The castle was most likely built under Michael II Komnenos Doukas (r. 1230–1266/68), the third ruler of Epirus: a monogram attributed to him has been found in a tower close to the main gate. As the capital of the Epirote principality, Arta was often besieged by the Byzantine Empire on the one hand and the Angevins of the Kingdom of Naples on the other. The Byzantines took the city in 1338/39, but it soon fell to the Serbian Empire, before Nikephoros II Orsini restored the Epirote state in 1356/57. The Serbian ruler Simeon Urosh ruled the city after 1359, until it fell to the Albanian Peter Losha, who established the Despotate of Arta. The city remained in Albanian hands until 1416 when, after a long siege, it the city fell to Carlo I Tocco, who thus re-established the Epirote state under his rule.

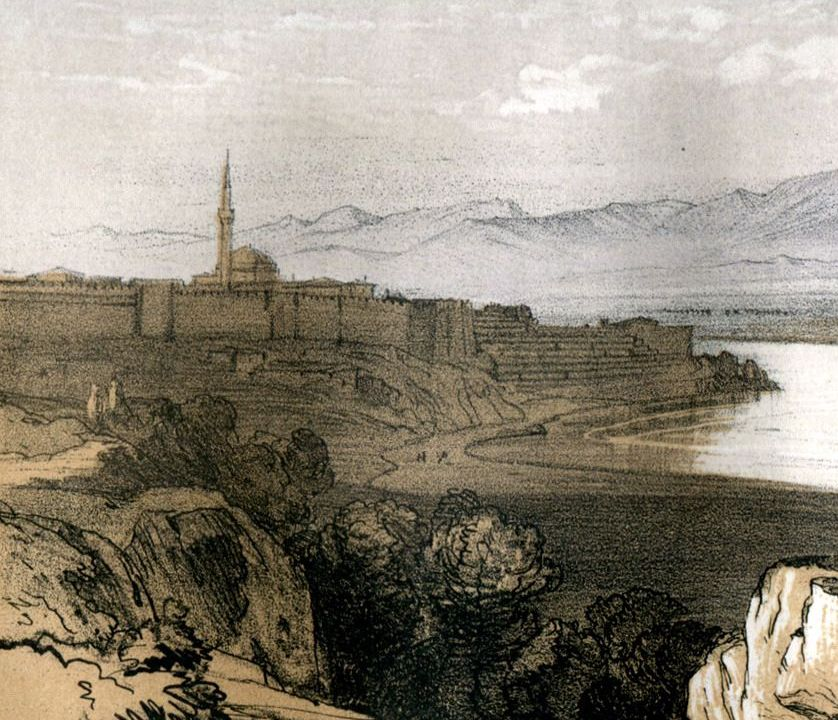
View of the castle, the now demolished Sultan Mehmed Mosque, and the Arachthos River in 1851

In 1449, Arta was conquered by the Ottoman Empire, who ruled it until 1717, with the exception of a Venetian occupation during the Morean War (1684–1699). From 1717 it was a mainland dependency of the Venetian Ionian Islands, until the Fall of the Republic of Venice in 1797, when it came under French control, only to be conquered by Ali Pasha of Janina two years later. It then remained part of the Ottoman Empire until the annexation of Arta into the Kingdom of Greece in 1881.

== Description ==
Built on a low hill, and originally abutting the bed of the Arachthos (it now flows some 200 metres (660 ft) to the east), the castle walls form an irregular shape extending some 280 metres (920 ft) long at the northeastern-southwestern axis and up to 175 metres (574 ft) wide. On the eastern side, once protected by the river, there is a single wall that incorporates part of the ancient city wall of Ambracia. On the other sides, the castle is protected by two walls, an inner one, some 10 metres (33 ft) high and protected by towers, and an external one of some 4–5 metres (13–16 ft) height, just far enough to enclose the inner wall's towers into its circuit. The inner wall survives intact to the present day, but the outer wall only in isolated stretches. The walls are on average 2.5 metres (8.2 ft) thick. The walls have been reinforced with many bastions, and the towers and parapets modified to hold artillery embrasures by the Ottomans and Venetians.

Remains of a Byzantine-era church and building suggest that these may have been the palace and palace church of the Despots of Epirus. Almost all archaeological remains in the interior of the castle have been wiped out, however, by the construction of a Xenia hotel in the 1960s.

== Sources ==
- Brooks, Allan (2013). Castles of Northwest Greece: From the Early Byzantine Period to the Eve of the First World War. Huddersfield: Aetos Press. ISBN 978-0-9575846-0-0.
- Gregory, Timothy E.; Ševčenko, Nancy Patterson (1991). "Arta". In Kazhdan, Alexander (ed.). The Oxford Dictionary of Byzantium. Oxford and New York: Oxford University Press. pp. 191–192. ISBN 0-19-504652-8.
- Soustal, Peter; Koder, Johannes (1981). Tabula Imperii Byzantini, Band 3: Nikopolis und Kephallēnia (in German). Vienna: Verlag der Österreichischen Akademie der Wissenschaften. ISBN 978-3-7001-0399-8.
