= Qamil Musa Haxhi Feza =

Albanian statesman

Qamil Musa Haxhi Feza (?–died after 1914.) was an Albanian statesman. He became a chairman of the Administrative Commission on 3 September 1914 and held that position for less than a month, as the position was abolished the same month it was established.
