= Faizullah (Taliban leader) =

Maulvi Faizullah is a Taliban leader In September 2003 CNN characterized Maulvi Faizullah as a senior Taliban commander.
