= Faïza Kefi =

Tunisian jurist and politician (born 1949)

President of the National Audit Office
- In office March 2004 – July 2011
- President: Zine El Abidine Ben Ali
- Succeeded by: M. Abdellatif Kharrat

Ambassador of Tunisia to France
- In office May 2001 – 2003

Minister of Professional Training and Employment
- In office 2000 – May 2001
- President: Zine El Abidine Ben Ali

Minister of Environment and Land Development
- In office April 1999 – 2000
- President: Zine El Abidine Ben Ali
- Preceded by: Mohamed Mlika

Personal details
- Born: 1949 (age 76–77)
- Party: Democratic Constitutional Rally (1987–2011); Nidaa Tounes
- Education: University of Tunis
- Occupation: Jurist

Faïza Kefi (born 1949) is a Tunisian jurist, politician and diplomat who has held various posts, including minister of environment and land development, member of the Parliament and ambassador of Tunisia to France.

== Early life and education ==
She was born in 1949. She attended Tunis University obtaining a degree in public law. She also received in educational planning from the National Civil Services School. In addition, she holds a master's degree in law and a PhD from the University of Administrative Sciences.

== Career and activities ==
Kefi worked at Ministry of National Education, Ministry of Women's Affairs and Ministry of Planning. She was part of the Tunisian delegation to the World Conference on Women held in Nairobi in 1985. She joined the ruling party Democratic Constitutional Rally the day after the Tunisian President Zine El Abidine Ben Ali came to power in November 1987. Then she was elected as a deputy to the National Assembly in 1994. There she was the president of the Inter-Parliamentary Union Coordinating Committee of Women Parliamentarians. In 1993 she became the president of the Tunisian National Women's Union. She held the post until 1999.

Then Kefi was appointed the minister of the environment and land development in April 1999, replacing Mohamed Mlika in the post, and became the second Tunisian woman holding a cabinet post. Kefi's next cabinet post was the minister of professional training and employment. Then she was named as the ambassador of Tunisia to France in May 2001 and held the post until 2003. She was appointed head of the Tunisian national audit office in March 2004. She remained in office until July 2011 when she was succeeded by M. Abdellatif Kharrat in the post.

Kefi became the president of the Technical Committee for the Social Dialogue in 2013. She was elected as one of the ten members of the executive bureau of the Nidaa Tounes party in March 2015.

== Personal life ==
Kefi is married and has three children.
