= Feizollah Nasseri =

Iranian weightlifter (born 1955)

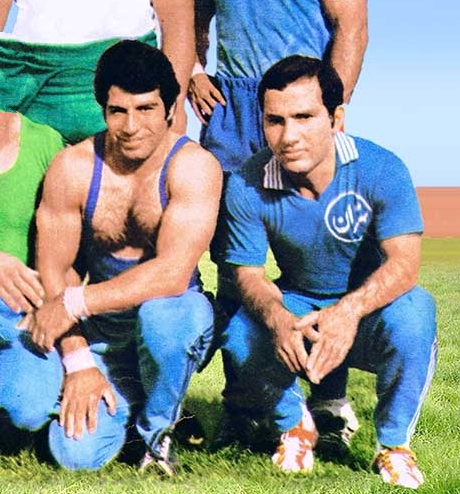
- Nasseri (right) in 1975

Personal information
- Born: 1 May 1955 (age 71) Tehran, Iran
- Height: 153 cm (5 ft 0 in)

Sport
- Sport: Weightlifting

Feyzollah Nasseri (Persian: فیض الله ناصری, born 1 May 1955) is a retired Iranian bantamweight weightlifter. He was the youngest member of Iran's weightlifting team in 1976 Summer Olympics, where he finished in tenth place. He placed fourth at the 1978 World Weightlifting Championships.
