= Aboutorab Naficy =

Iranian physician and heart specialist (1914 - 2007)

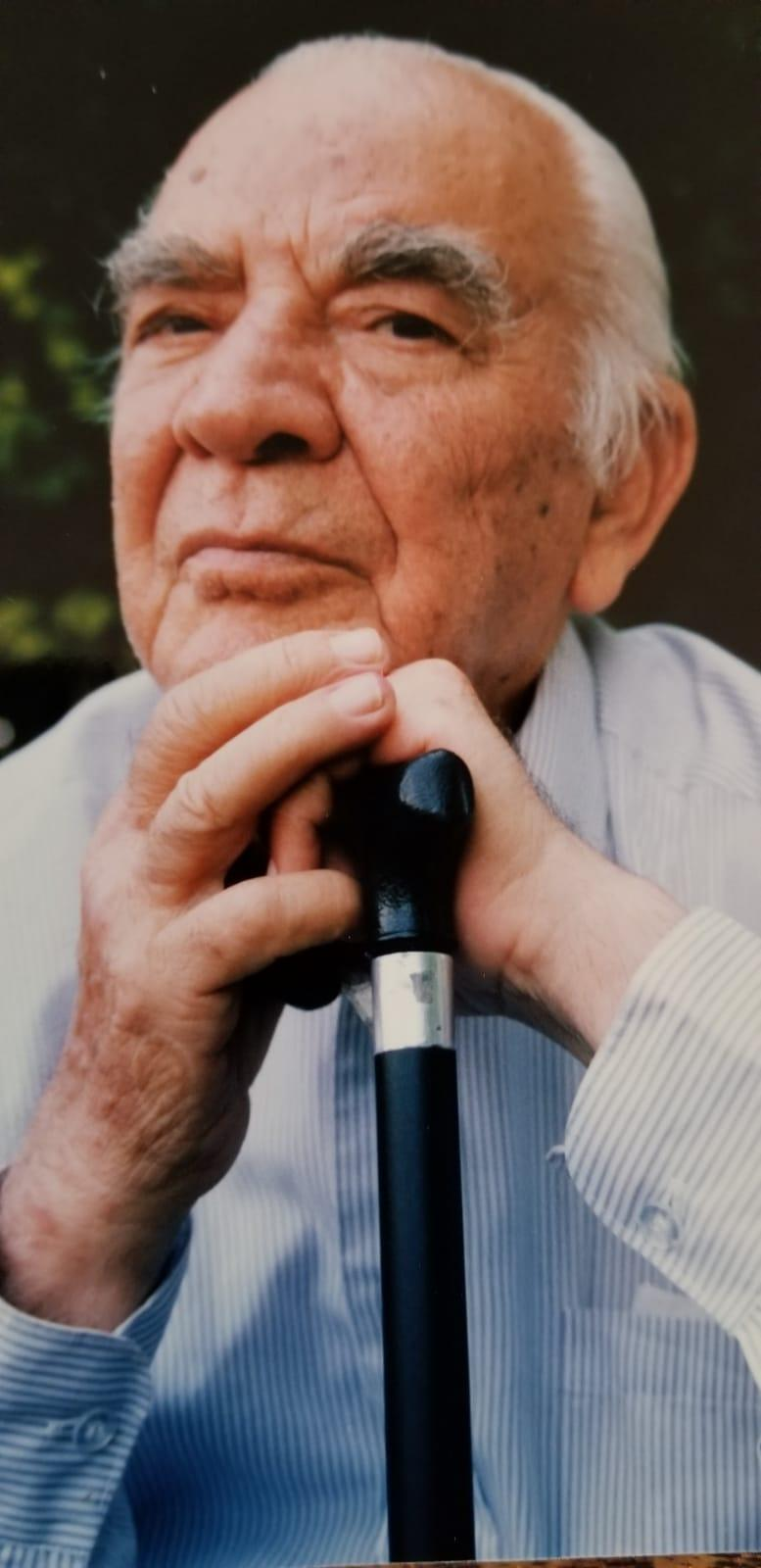
- Dr. Naficy, Isfahan, Iran, 1999
- Died: November 2007 (aged 92–93); Isfahan, Iran
- Institutions: Harvard University; Isfahan University
- Main interests: Internal Medicine Heart

Aboutorab Naficy (Persian: ابوتراب نفیسی) was an Iranian physician and cardiovascular specialist.

He was a professor of medicine at Isfahan University’s Medical School and a member of the Iranian Encyclopedia of Medical Sciences while maintaining a private practice. Naficy published 22 books in his lifetime as well as 80 articles.

== Early life ==
Naficy attended a screening of the film Behind the Doctor in Isfahan on March 17, 1944. The film was about the diagnosis of diphtheria and ended with a question-and-answer session afterward. Through such methods, surgical techniques were disseminated throughout Iran.

== Career ==
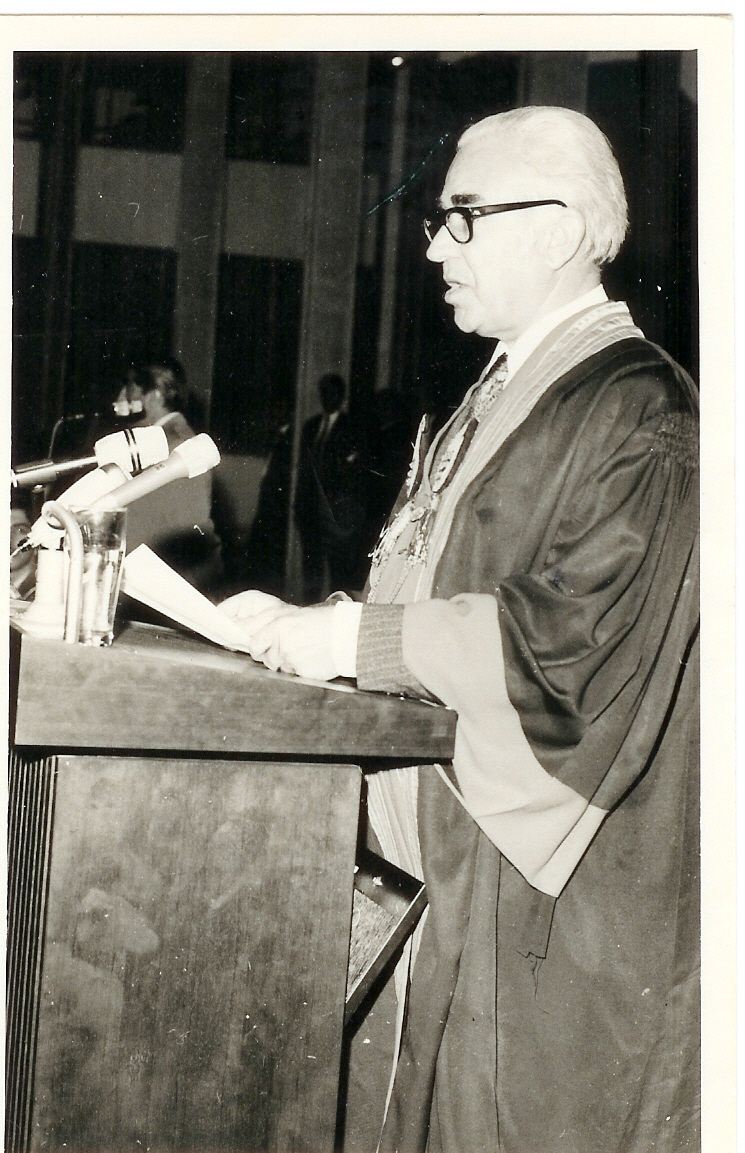
Naficy at 1971 Isfahan Medical School Commencement

Between the 1950s and the 1970s, he taught and published textbooks about modern medicine, while continuing his research into traditional medicine, herbal medicine, and Islamic medicine. For a time, he served as director of the Institute for the Study of Traditional Medicine at Isfahan University's School of Medicine. He retired from the university in 1981, and in 1990 was known as the Distinguished Permanent member of the Iranian Encyclopedia of Medical Sciences. He continued to work in his private clinic until 1994.

== Works ==
Naficy published 22 books in his lifetime as well as 80 articles. His books are listed below. All these books are written in Persian.

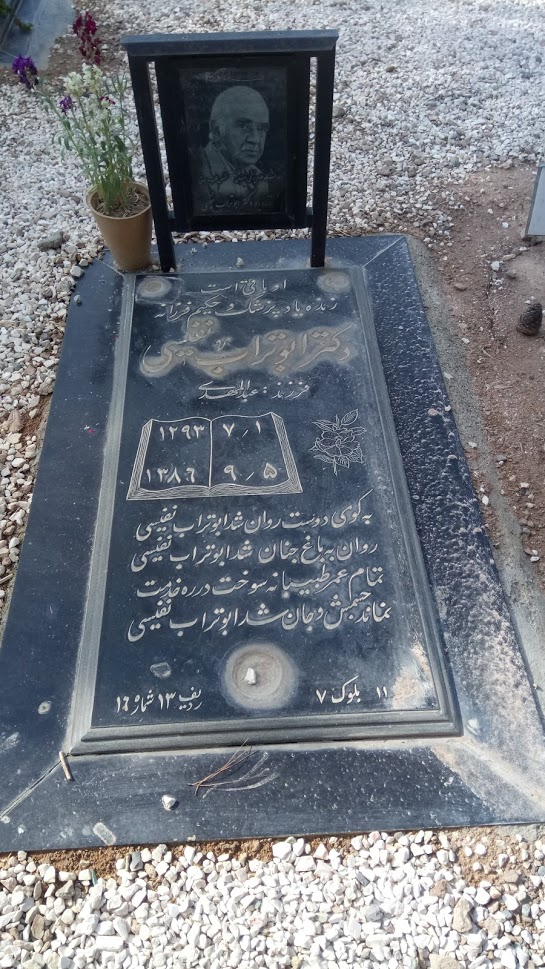
Grave of Abutorab Nafisi

=== Modern medicine ===
- Semiology of the Illnesses of the Nervous System. Isfahan: Emami Printing House, 1951.
- Principles of Cardiography. Isfahan: Isfahan University/Daad Printing House, 1960.
- Semiology of Heart and Lung. Isfahan: Shahsavari Bookshop, 1961.
- Semiology of Digestion. Isfahan: Rah Nejat Publisher, Shahsavari Bookshop, 1962.
- Semiology of Chest. Isfahan: Rah Nejat Publisher, 1962
- How to Learn (First Lesson: How to Learn Medicine). Isfahan: Isfahan University, 1969.
- Introduction to Learning Techniques in Medical Science. Isfahan: Isfahan University, 1976.
- For One Who Has No Physician to Attend Him (Man la Yahduruhu Al-Tabib) (من لا يحضره الطبيب). Abū Bakr Muḥammad ibn Zakariyyā al-Rāzī, (Translated by Naficy) Tehran: Tehran University. September 1984.
- A Brief History of Medical Sciences to Present Century. Isfahan: Isfahan University, 1986.
- History of Medical Ethics. Isfahan: Isfahan University, 1992.

=== Traditional medicine ===
- Investigation into the Traditional Medical Beliefs Among Iranians. Isfahan: Mash’al Publisher, 1985.
- Traditional Beliefs of Iranians: About Physical and Mental Health and Treatments of Common Illnesses. Isfahan: Isfahan University, 1989.
- Properties of Foods and Beverages Through Centuries Among Different Nations of the World. Isfahan: Isfahan University Jihad Daneshgahi, 1983, reprinted 2014.

=== Religious topics ===
- Humans, Successors for God on Earth. Tabriz: Azar Abadegan Publisher, 1965
- An Analytic Study of Young Peoples’ Problems. Isfahan: Kanun Elmi va Tarbiyati-ye Jahan-e Islam, 1970.
- Islam and Contemporary Knowledge. Isfahan: Qaem Publisher, 1971.
- Humankind, Masterpiece of Creation. Tabriz: Tabriz University. 1971.
- Examination of Fasting from the Medical Science’s Perspective. Qom: Maktab Islam, 1971.
- How to Raise Children and How Different Countries Raise Their Children. Bita Publisher

=== Books about Dr. Aboutorab Naficy ===
- Pulse of Life: From Traditional Medicine to Modern Medicine of Iran: Life and Works of Dr. Aboutorab Naficy. Nasrin Naficy and Mehdy Naficy, eds. Isfahan: Naqsh Khorshid Publication, 2001.

نبض حیات: در گذر طب سنتی و طب نوین ایران. زندگی و آثار دکتر ابوتراب نفیسی. به اهتمام نسرین نفیسی، مهدی نفیسی. 1380، انتشارات نقش خورشید، اصفهان

- Life History and Scientific and Cultural Contributions of Dr. Aboutorab Naficy. Tehran: Society for Cultural Traditions and Accomplishments (in Persian), March 2015.

زندگی نامه و خدمات علمی و فرهنگی مرحوم دکتر ابوتراب نفیسی. انجمن آثار و مفاخر فرهنگی، اسفند 1393، تهران

- Aboutorab Naficy. My Life in Medicine (in Persian). Nasrin Naficy, ed. Isfahan: Mani Publication and School of Medical Sciences of Isfahan University, 2018.

زندگی پزشگی من. دکتر ابوتراب نفیسی. به اهتمام نسرین نفیسی، انتشارات مانی، با همکاری دانشگاه علوم پزشکی اصفهان، 1396، اصفهان
