= Faik Pasha Mosque =

Former mosque in Arta, Greece

- Φαΐκ Πασά Τζαμί
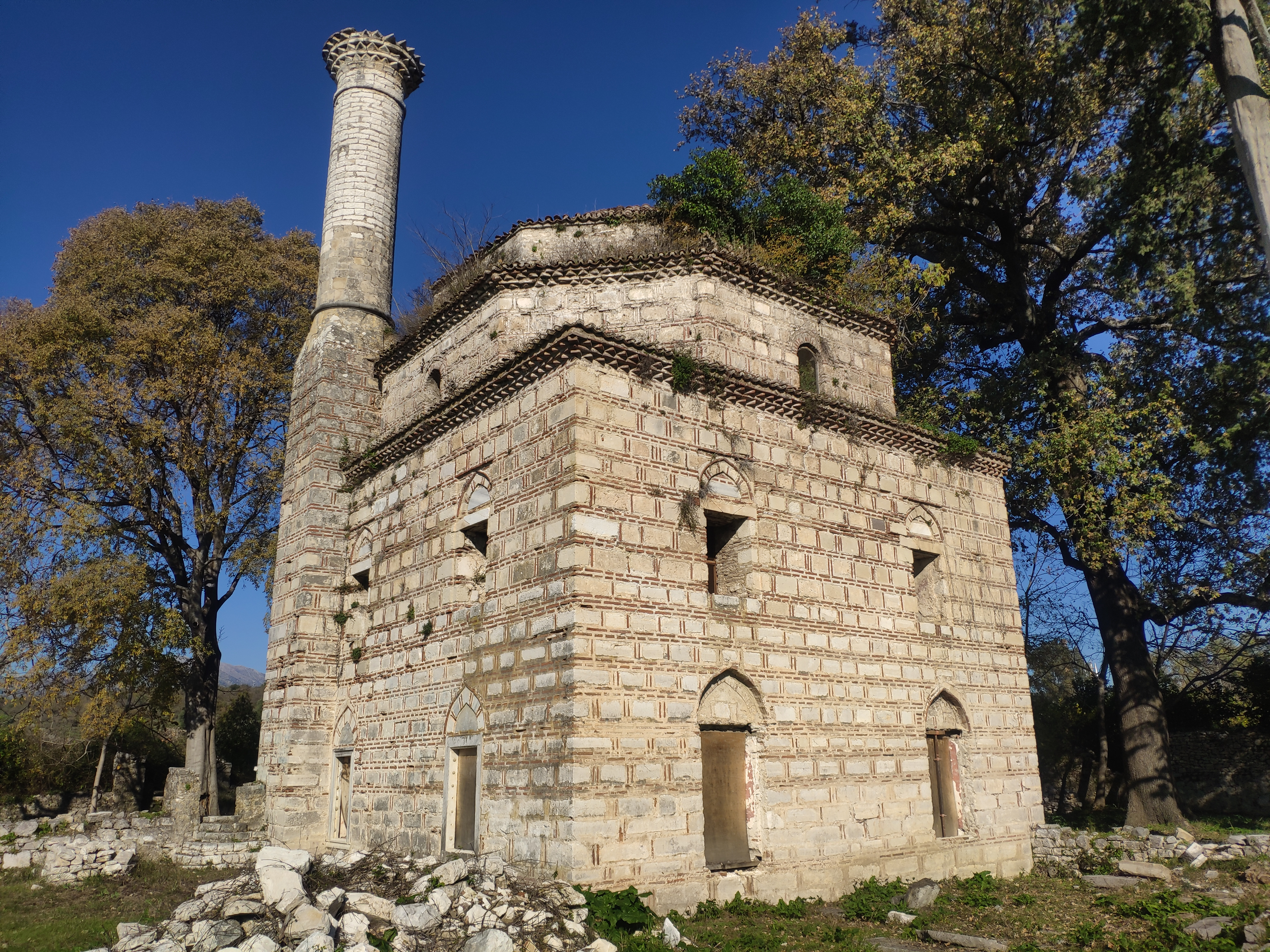

- Location of the former mosque in Greece

Religion
- Affiliation: Islam (former)
- Ecclesiastical or organizational status: Mosque (15th century–1820s)
- Status: Abandoned (as a mosque); Archaeological site (since the 1990s)

Location
- Location: Arta, Epirus
- Country: Greece
- Interactive map of Faik Pasha Mosque
- Coordinates: 39°09′57″N 20°58′22″E

Architecture
- Type: Mosque
- Style: Ottoman
- Funded by: Faik Pasha
- Completed: 15th century

Specifications
- Dome: 1
- Minaret: 1 (half-destroyed)
- Materials: Brick; stone

The Faik Pasha Mosque (Greek: Τζαμί Φαΐκ Πασά, Albanian: Xhamia e Faik Pashës, from Turkish: Faik Paşa Camii), also known locally as the Imaret of Arta (Greek: Ιμαρέτ της Άρτας), is a former mosque located in the town of Arta, in the Epirus region of Greece. Completed in the 15th century during the Ottoman era, the mosque was named after the Ottoman Empire conqueror of the city in 1449, the mosque formed a complex including baths, an imaret and a madrasa. The building ceased being used as a mosque in the 1820s and has been an archaeological site since the 1990s.

It is one of the two surviving mosques in Arta, the other being the Feyzullah Mosque.

== Location ==
The Faik Pasha Mosque is located in the ancient locality of Marati near the village of Marathovouni, on the right bank of the Arachthos river and about 1.5 kilometres (0.93 mi) north of the Bridge of Arta. During the Ottoman era, the area surrounding the edifice bore the general name of Top-Alti, a Turkish term describing the sector which was within cannon range of the castle of Arta. The traveler Evliya Çelebi mentioned the Muslim village of Karye-i Imaret, from which derives the Greek toponym Marati.

== History ==
=== Ottoman Era ===
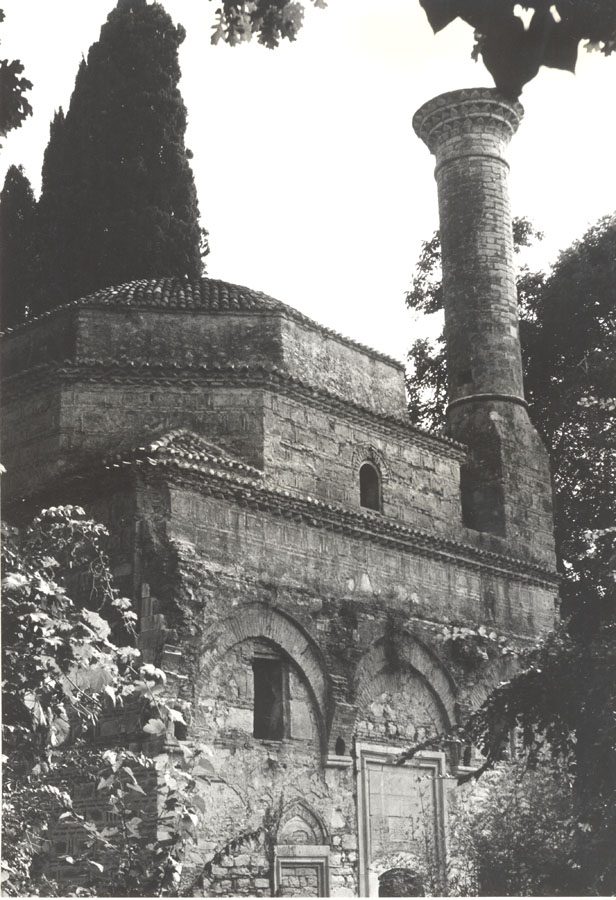
Old photograph

The Faik Pasha Mosque was probably erected on the site of an earlier Byzantine church dedicated to Saint John the Baptist. Its sponsor was Faik Pasha, conqueror of the city and an Ottoman vizier, hence the mosque's name. Two dating hypotheses exist; the first, formulated by the Metropolitan of Arta Seraphim of Byzantium, dates the building back to around 1455. According to oral tradition collected in the middle of the 18th century from an Ottoman inhabitant, Faik Pasha appointed an imam for the mosque but upon his death, not finding a worthy replacement, the pasha decided to retire from the army and take on the role of the imam himself. Faik Pasha is said to have remained imam for about forty years, until his death in 1499. Based on this information, the Metropolitan of Arta dated the construction of the mosque to the time of Sultan Mehmed II the Conqueror.

The second hypothesis places the construction of the mosque in 1492-1493, during the reign of Bayezid II. This dating appears more plausible than the previous conjecture, insofar as the Ottoman historian Aşıkpaşazade referred around 1478 to the mosque as being in draft form and that the founding charter (wakf) of Faik Pasha's institution, including an imaret and a madrasa, dates from 1493.

The institution derived its income from agricultural land in the villages of Vigla and Marati, which belonged to the Monastery of Panagia of Rhodia before the Ottoman rule of Epirus, as well as from properties near the cities of Thessaloniki and Yenice, modern Giannitsa.

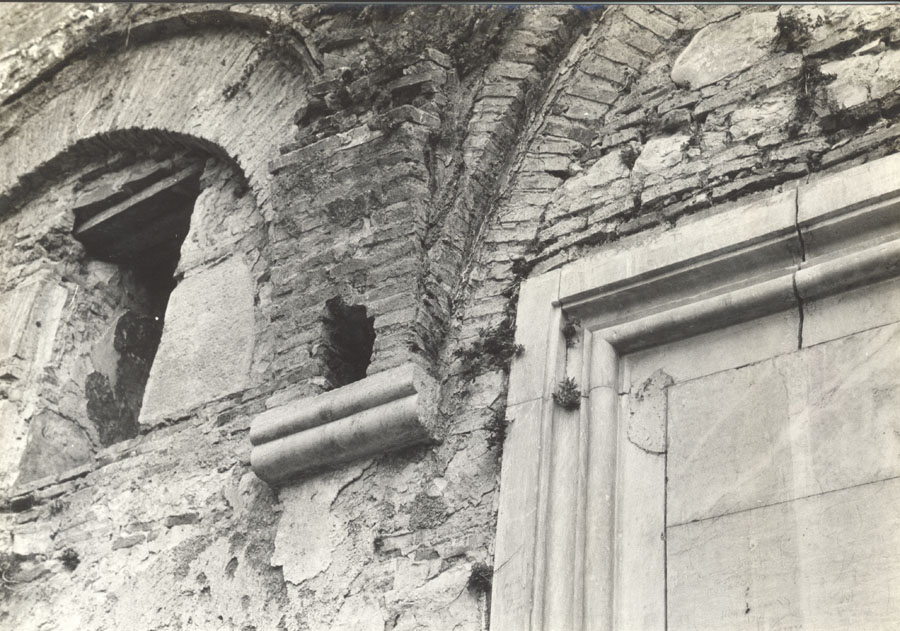
Facade of the mosque.

The place was visited by early 19th c. travellers: François Pouqueville highlighted the presence of Persian reeds, olive trees, lemon trees and orange trees, while in 1805 William Martin Leake described it as rich in hazel trees.

During the Greek War of Independence in 1821, the area became the scene of fighting during the siege of Arta. The mosque was an entrenchment camp for Karaiskakis, Markos Botsaris and a few hundred men, who resisted the assaults of the Ottoman garrison on November 12, 1821. During the Greco-Turkish War of 1897, the area around the mosque became once again a battleground between the Greek forces of Colonel Thrasyvoulos Manos and the Ottoman forces of Ahmed Hifzi Pasha.

=== Greece ===
After the annexation of Arta by the Kingdom of Greece in 1881 following the Convention of Constantinople, the mosque was briefly converted into a Christian church dedicated to Saint John the Russian.

In 1938, the building was declared a protected historic monument by royal decree. In 1994, excavations led to the discovery of several architectural portions of the porch and restoration work led to the rehabilitation of the paved floor. By the end of 2019, the studies for the general restoration of the monument were approved by the Central Archaeological Council and the work was finally put up for auction in the summer of 2022. The site is under the responsibility of the 8th Ephorate of Byzantine Antiquities of the Greek Ministry of Culture and Sports.

== Architecture ==
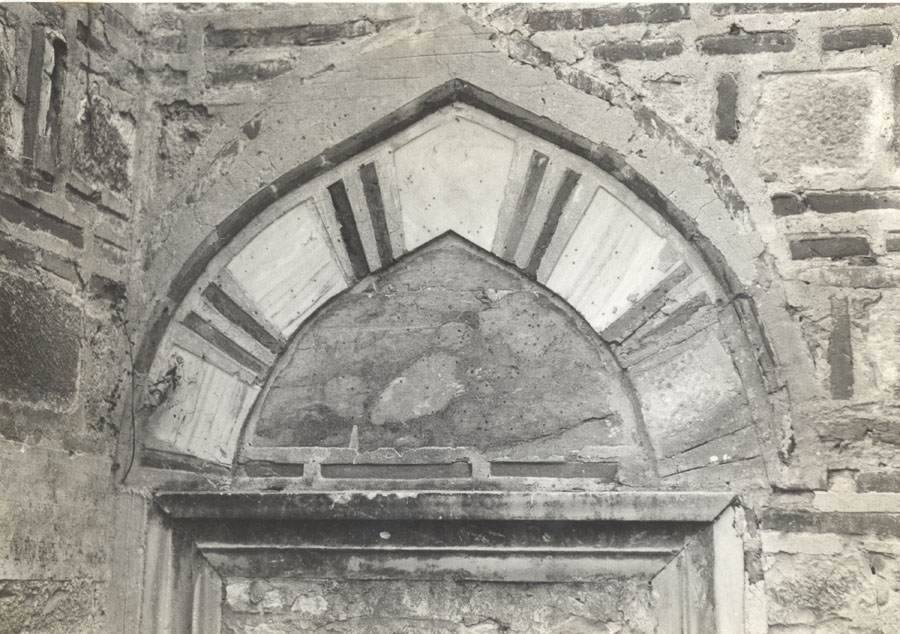
An arch

The Faik-Pasha Mosque consists of a square praying hall with external dimensions of 11.5 metres (38 ft) per side, surmounted by a dome whose drum is decorated with "Turkish triangles". On the main facade, facing the north, there once stood a porch (revak), the remains of which are still visible to this day. Constructed as a partitioned apparatus, the masonry incorporates certain materials from the Byzantine church of the Panagia Paregoretissa from the ancient city of Nicopolis, as well as from various ancient buildings in the city of Ambracia (ancient Arta). Materials of the now collapsed porch came from the nearby monastery of Panagia Pantanassa, founded in the middle of the 13th century by Michael II Doukas. At the north-west corner stands the cylindrical minaret made of brick, preserved up to the balcony, probably rebuilt for the last time in the 19th century. Inside, the monument retains traces of its dual use as a mosque and a church: the mihrab occupies the center of the southern wall while the remains of the iconostasis can be seen on the eastern wall.

Apart from the mosque, the remains of the baths located a few dozen meters to the northwest are the only traces that have come down to us of the monumental complex of Faik Pasha.

== Gallery ==
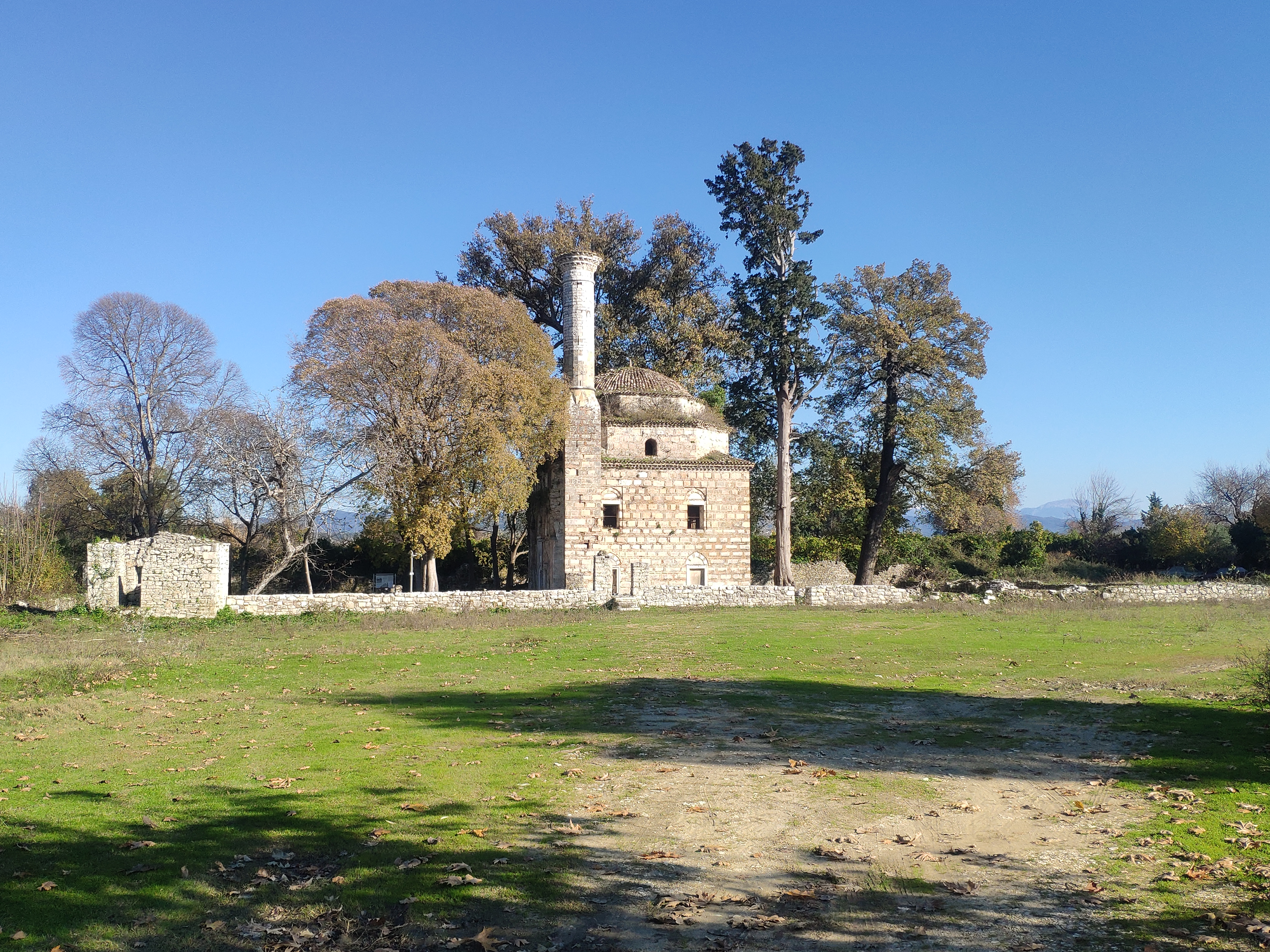
Distant view of the mosque from the west

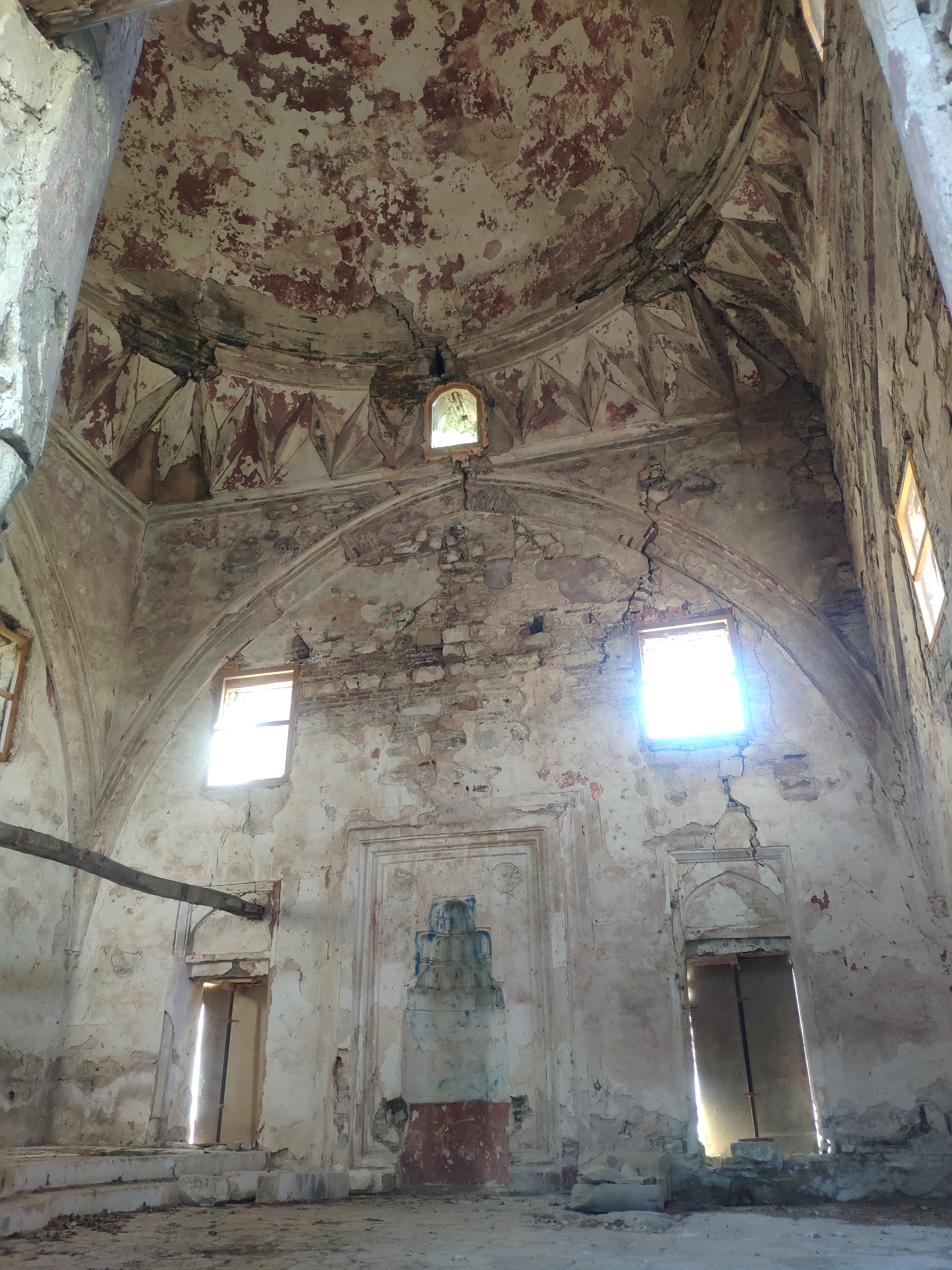
Interior of the mosque from the northwest

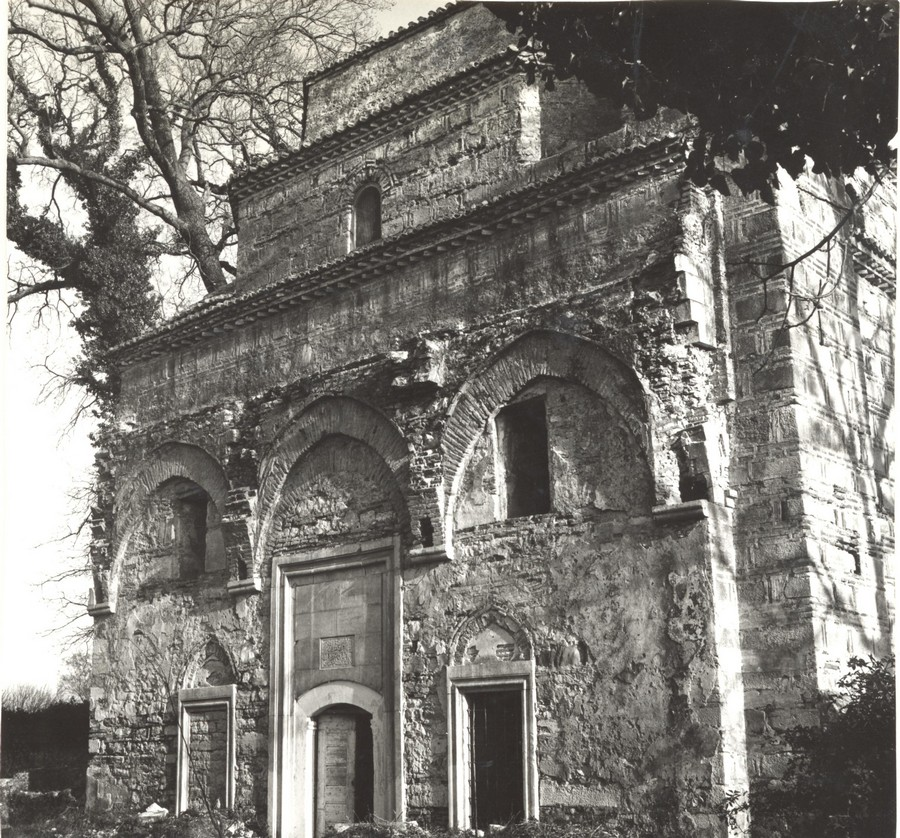
Photograph of Machiel Kiel in the 1970s

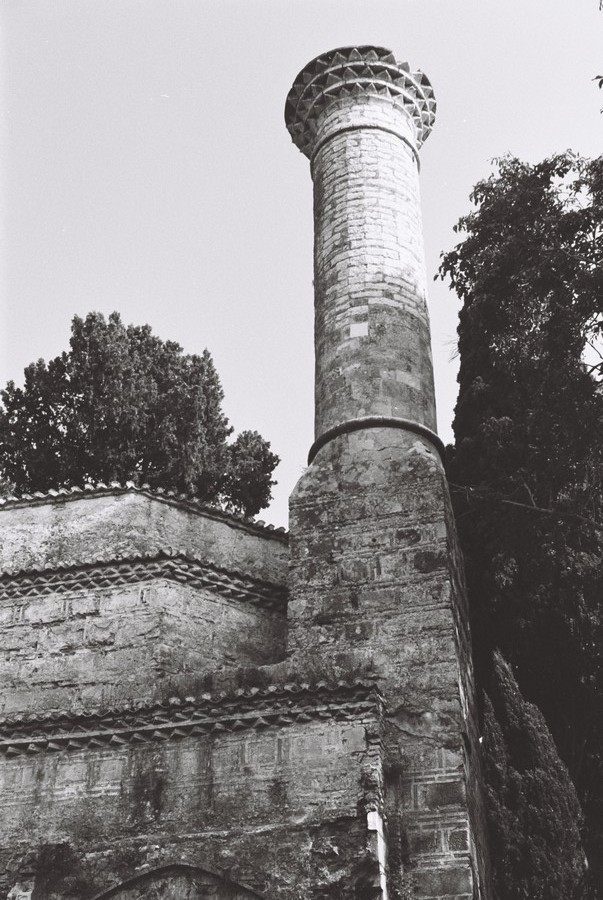
The minaret at the northwest corner

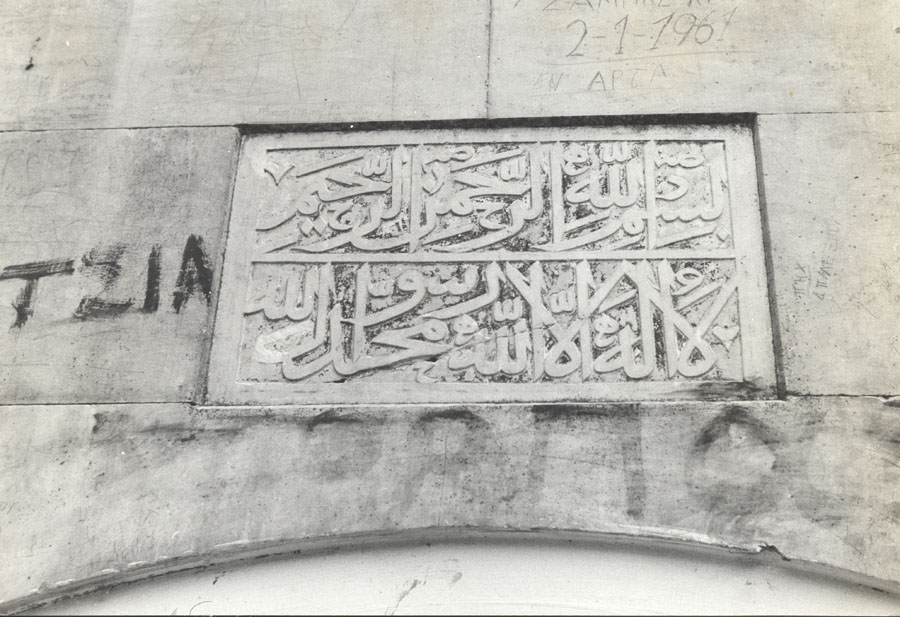
Detail of the dedicatory inscription

== See also ==
- Islam in Greece
- List of former mosques in Greece
- Ottoman Greece
