= Fayez =

Fayez (Arabic: فَائِز) is an Arabic given name for males, a variant of Faiz. People named Fayez include:

- Fayez Bandar (born 1983), Kuwaiti footballer
- Fayez Ghosn (1950–2021), Lebanese politician
- Fayez Sarofim (1929–2022), Coptic Egyptian American fund manager
- Fayez al-Tarawneh (1949–2021), former Prime Minister of Jordan
