= Feyzullah Mosque =

Former mosque in Arta, Greece

- Φεϋζούλ Τζαμί
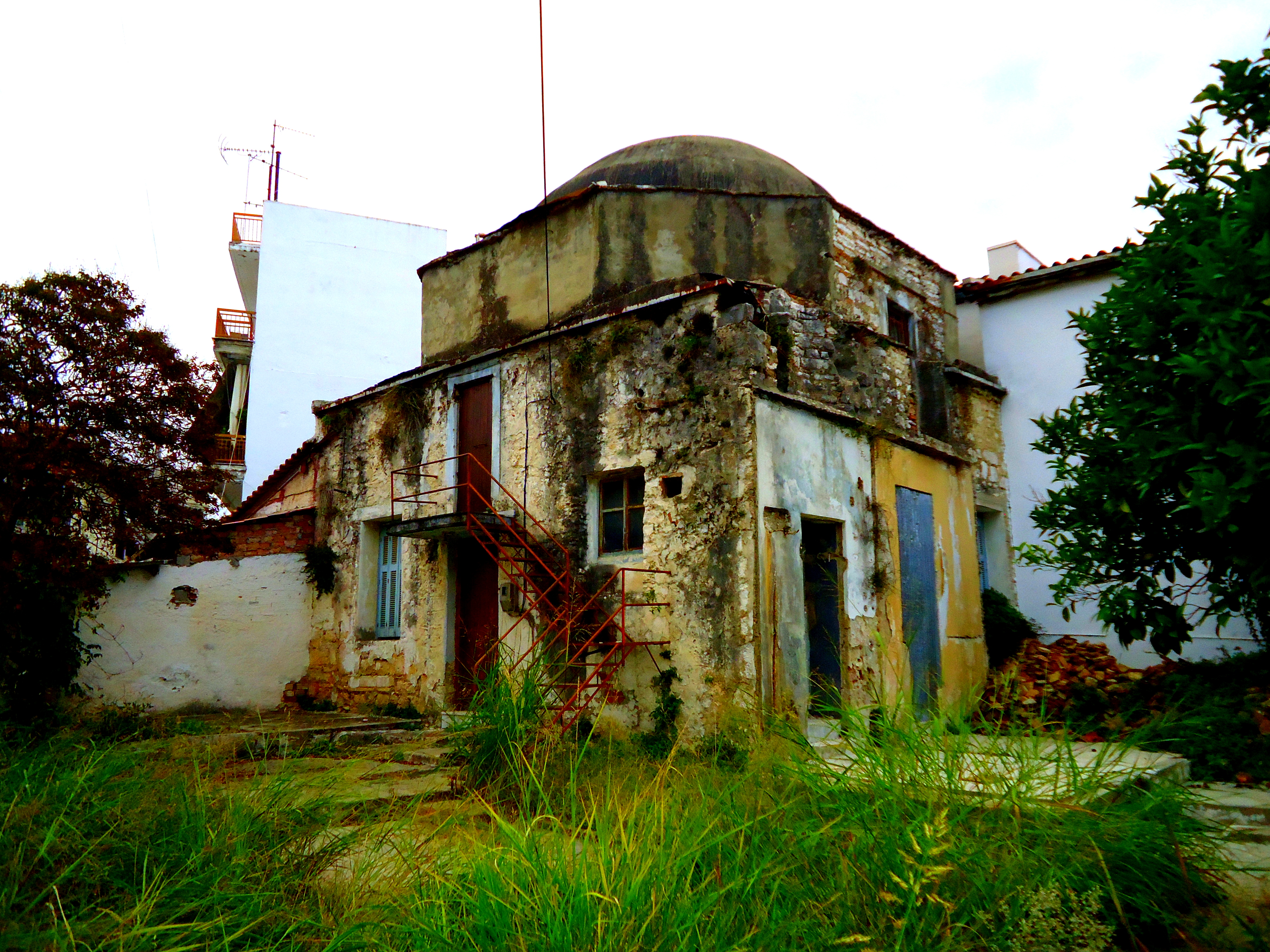

- Location of the former mosque in Greece

Religion
- Affiliation: Islam (former)
- Ecclesiastical or organisational status: Mosque (15th century–1890s)
- Status: Abandoned (as a mosque); Repurposed (as an archeological site)

Location
- Location: Arta, Epirus
- Country: Greece
- Interactive map of Feyzullah Mosque
- Coordinates: 39°9′46″N 20°58′55″E

Architecture
- Type: Mosque
- Style: Ottoman
- Funded by: Feyzullah
- Completed: 15th century

Specifications
- Dome: 1
- Minaret: 1 (destroyed)
- Materials: Brick; stone

The Feyzullah or Feyzul Mosque (Greek: Φεϋζούλ Τζαμί, Albanian: Xhamia Feuzul, Turkish: Feyzullah Camii, lit. 'Mosque of Feyzullah') is a former mosque in the town of Arta, in the Epirus region of Greece. The mosque was completed in the 15th century, during the Ottoman era.

== History ==
The mosque was named after one Feyzullah, who was the mosque's donor. It is one of the two surviving mosques in Arta, the other being the Faik Pasha Mosque. The time of its construction can not be determined, however, it is considered to have been built around the same time as the Mosque of Faik Pasha was, the first commander of Arta after the Turkish conquest, so it should be dated in the 15th century. This is further supported by the fact that Suleiman Mustafa, Faik Pasha's flag-bearer, was buried in the mosque.

During the hostilities in Epirus during the Greek-Turkish war of 1897, part of the mosque's minaret was destroyed; the rest of the minaret collapsed in 1917.

Until 1941, it belonged to the Ottoman Emin Bey. In 1962, the mosque was declared an archeological site.

== Architecture ==
This mosque, like most mosques in Greece and the rest of the Balkans, is of type A. It consists of a simple one-room prayer hall, with a square plan and size, measuring 6.4 metres (21 ft). It is located on Arachthou and Katsantoni street, a short distance from the church of Agia Theodora, the patron saint of the town of Arta.

== See also ==
- Islam in Greece
- List of former mosques in Greece
- Ottoman Greece
