= The Awakening (sculpture) =

Statue in Prince George's County, Maryland, US

Coordinates: 38°47′6″N 77°1′1″W

The Awakening (1980) is a 72-foot (22 m) statue by J. Seward Johnson, Jr. that depicts a giant embedded in the earth, struggling to free himself. There are five editions of The Awakening according to Emma Vitello, an Associate Curator at the Seward Johnson Atelier. The original one, which used to sit at Hains Point is now located at the National Harbor in Oxon Hill, Maryland. That giant now emerges from sand. It is located at National Harbor in Prince George's County, Maryland, United States, just outside Washington, D.C. The second edition, Il Risveglio (The Awakening), was done in fiberglass, is located in Viterbo, Italy. The third edition sits along the Missouri River in Chesterfield, Missouri. The third and fourth editions can be found at the Grounds for Sculpture in Hamilton, New Jersey and St. Michaels Farm Preserve, Hopewell, New Jersey, respectively.

== Description ==
The original statue consists of five separate aluminum pieces buried in the ground, giving the impression of a distressed giant attempting to free himself from the ground. The left hand and right foot barely protrude, while the bent left leg and knee jut into the air. The 17-foot (5.2 m) high right arm and hand reach farther out of the ground. The bearded face, with the mouth in mid-scream, struggles to emerge from the earth.

== History ==
=== The Original ===
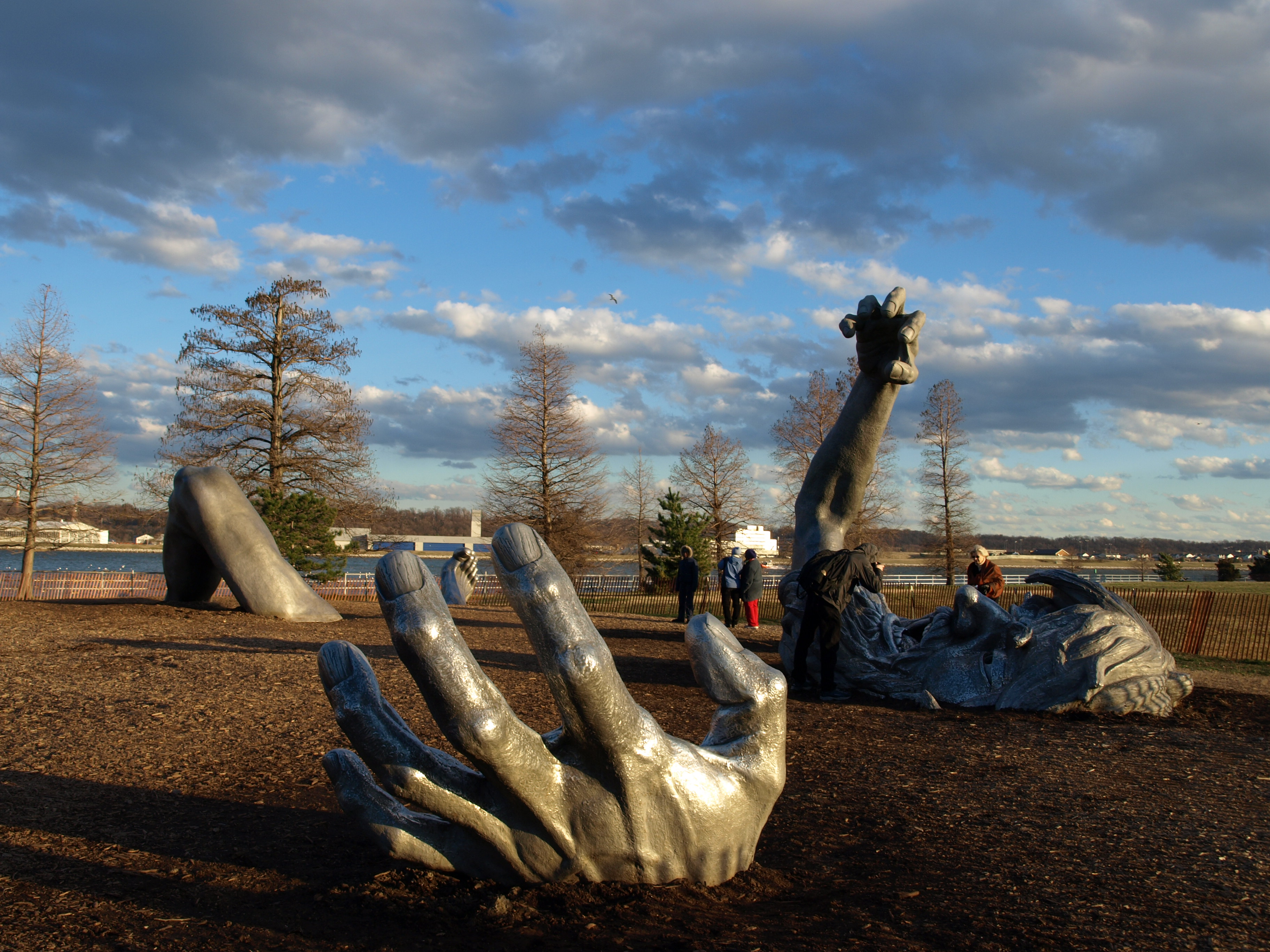
The Awakening (The Original) at its former location at Hains Point, Washington, D.C.

The Awakening was created by J. Seward Johnson, Jr. in 1980 as part of Washington, DC's 11th annual Sculpture Conference, and the sculpture was originally installed at Hains Point in East Potomac Park, Washington, D.C.. Hains Point was designated by Congress as the site for a National Peace Garden in 1987. Although no work had started on the National Peace Garden for many years, the decision still prompted the eventual sale of the sculpture by its owner, The Sculpture Foundation.

Real estate developer Milton Peterson purchased the sculpture for over $700,000 in 2007 for installation at his new National Harbor development in Maryland. Crews removed The Awakening from Hains Point in February 2008 for its move to National Harbor. At the National Harbor development, the sculpture was installed on a specially built beach along the Potomac River.

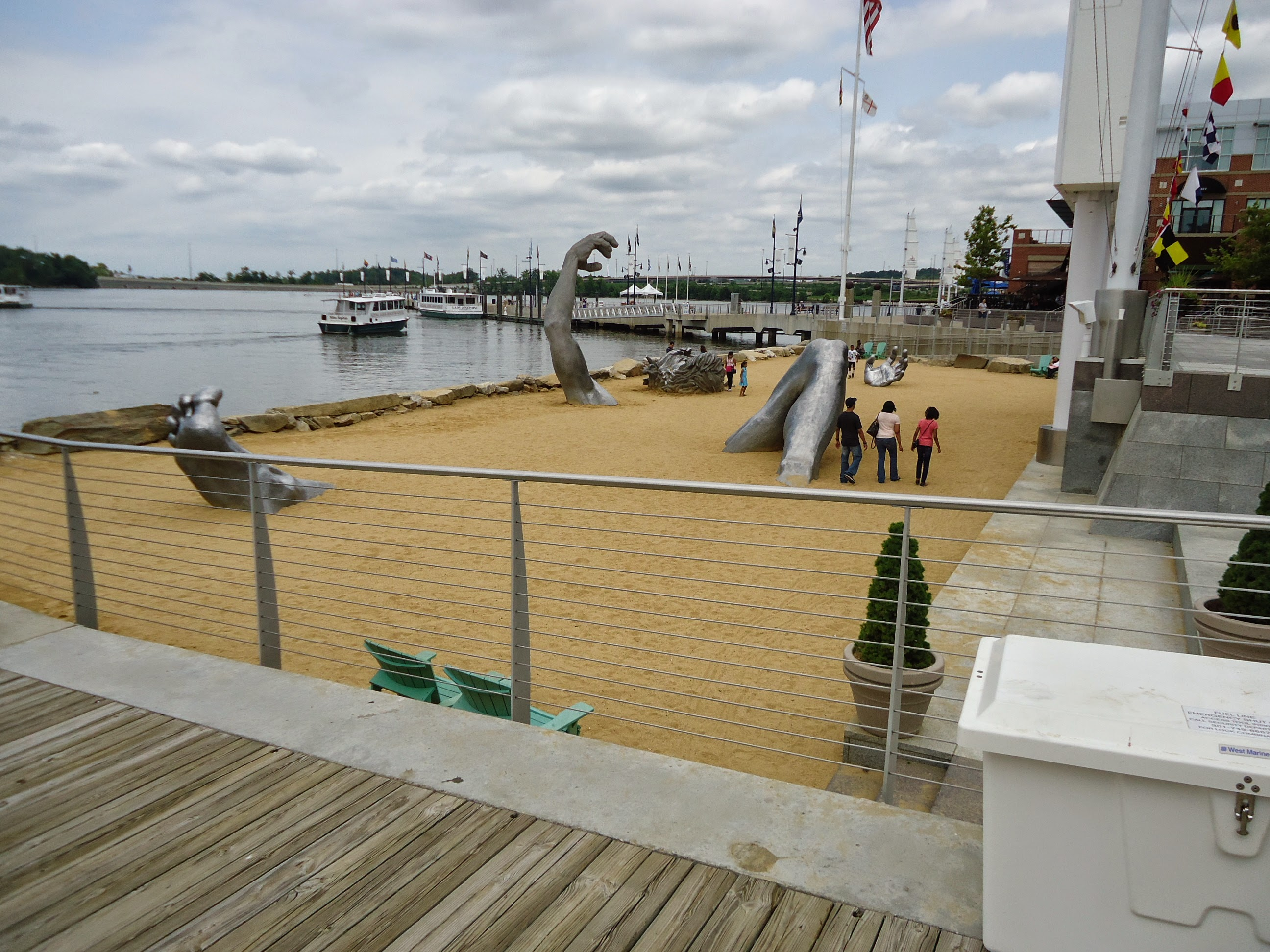
The statue at its current location on a man-made beach along the Potomac River at National Harbor, Maryland.

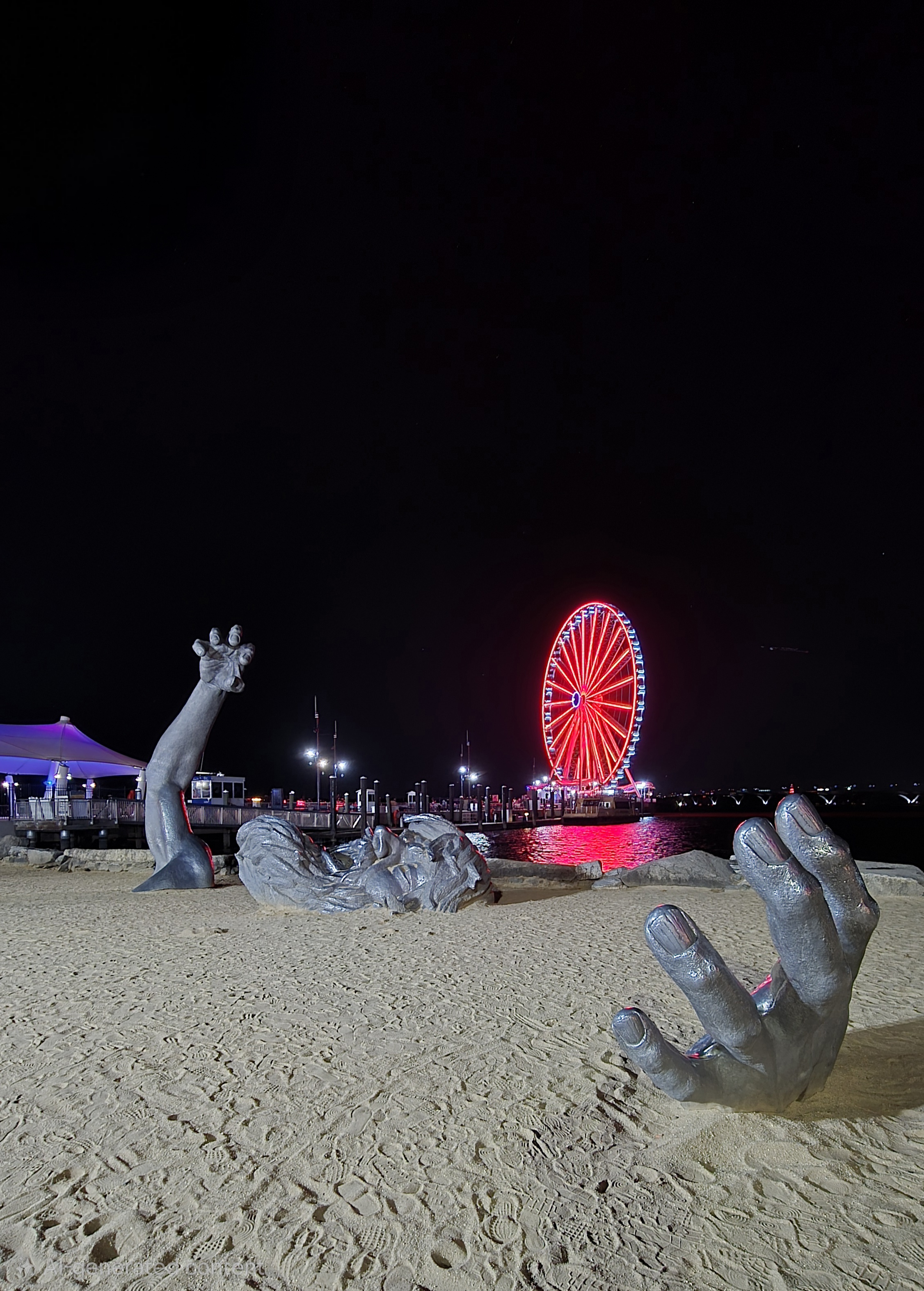
The Awakening is located at an artificial beach in the National Harbor development south of Washington DC.

=== Second Edition, a.k.a. "Il Risveglio" (Translation: The Awakening) ===
A fiberglass copy of The Awakening, also made by Seward Johnson, has been exhibited in at least three places in Italy, where it is called Il Risveglio. It was installed there first in April 2009 on Piazza Duomo (Cathedral Square) on the island of Ortygia, the historic, old part of Syracuse, Sicily at the time of some G8 meetings in Italy. In December of that year, it was moved to the EUR district of Rome, in connection with a commemoration of twenty years since the fall of the Berlin Wall. It was installed next to an obelisk in the Piazza Guglielmo Marconi. Finally, in May 2011, it was installed in Viterbo in the Valle di Faul Park.

=== Third Edition ===
Seward Johnson created an aluminum copy of The Awakening, which was unveiled in Chesterfield, Missouri on October 10, 2009. The sculpture is located adjacent to Chesterfield Central Park, near the intersection of Chesterfield Parkway and Park Circle Drive to the west of Chesterfield Mall. The installation of the sculpture in Chesterfield was commissioned by Chesterfield Arts, which is a non-profit arts organization supporting public art and the visual, performing and literary arts in Chesterfield and the West County. $1 million in funding was provided by Sachs Properties.

=== Fourth Edition ===
Erected in 2014, the fourth edition of The Awakening is located at the Grounds for Sculpture in Hamilton, New Jersey. The Awakening artist, Seward Johnson, also founded Grounds for Sculpture; a 42-acre, non-profit sculpture park, arboretum, and museum in Hamilton, New Jersey, in 1992 to make contemporary art accessible. Located on the former New Jersey State Fairgrounds, it features over 300+ large-scale, outdoor, contemporary, and, at times, whimsical, sculptures alongside indoor gallery spaces.

=== Fifth Edition ===
A fifth edition of the iconic 72-foot sculpture The Awakening by Seward Johnson was installed at St. Michaels Farm Preserve in Hopewell Township, New Jersey, in April 2023, with an official opening ceremony held on May 21, 2023. Although Seward Johnson passed away March 10th, 2020 at the age of 89, the latest sculpture was made possible in collaboration with the Johnson Atelier, D&R Greenway Land Trust and the Hopewell Valley Arts Council by grant from the Atlantic Foundation, a Johnson Family foundation.

== Specifications ==
- Dimensions
  - Head 169"x142"x56.9"H
  - Left Hand 42"x79.5"x59"H
  - Right Arm 108"x129.5"x254.5"H
  - Left Leg 148"x252.5"x132"H
  - Right Foot 47.5"x84"x67.5"H

== Gallery ==
Photos of The Awakening
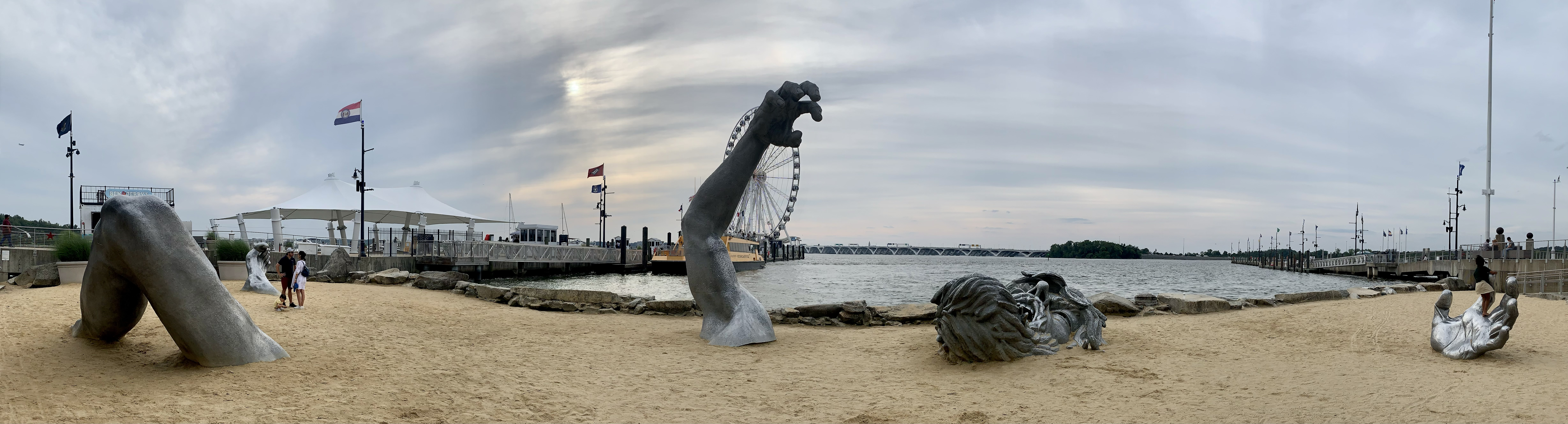
Panoramic view of the sculpture

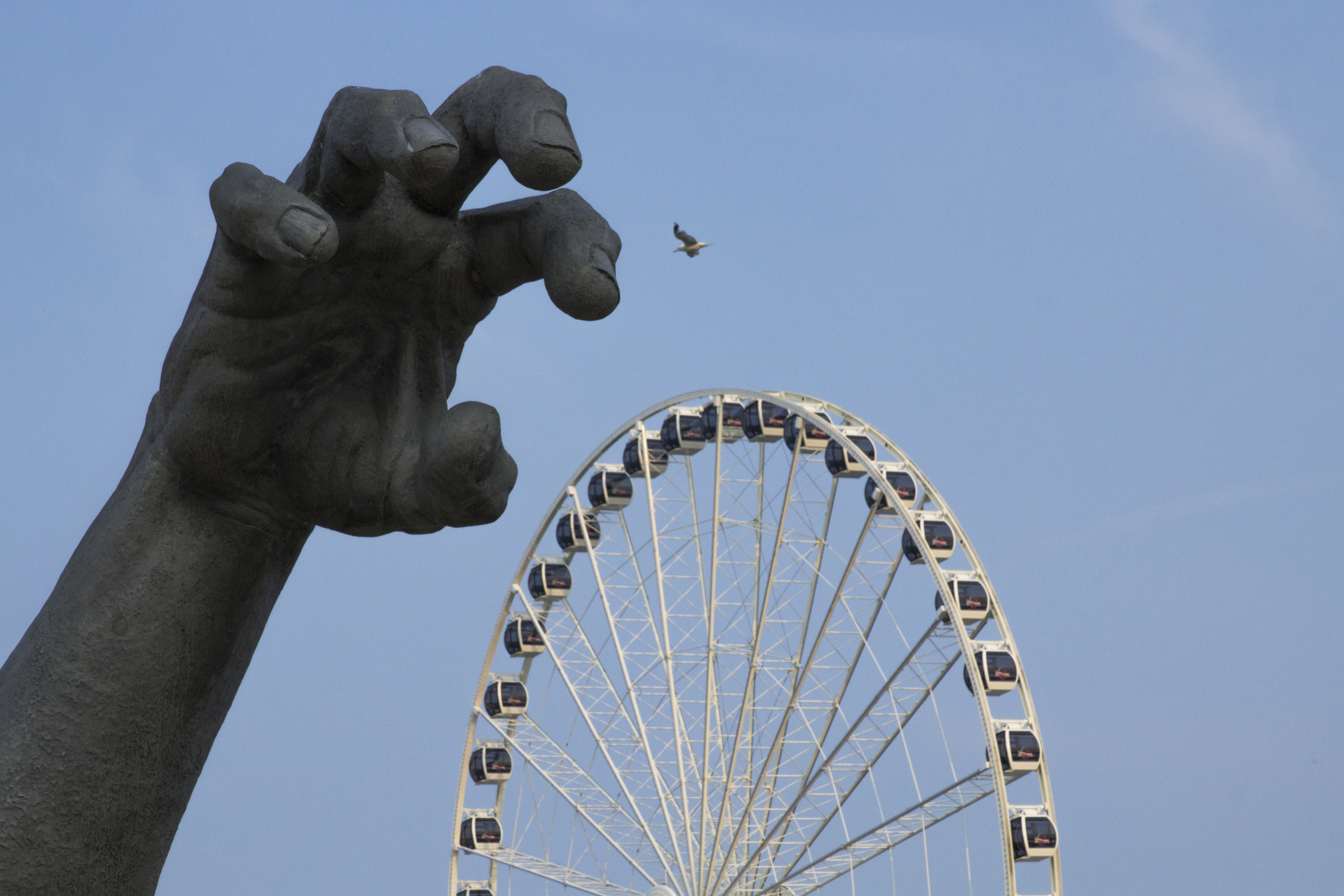
The statue's hand with the Capital Wheel in the background

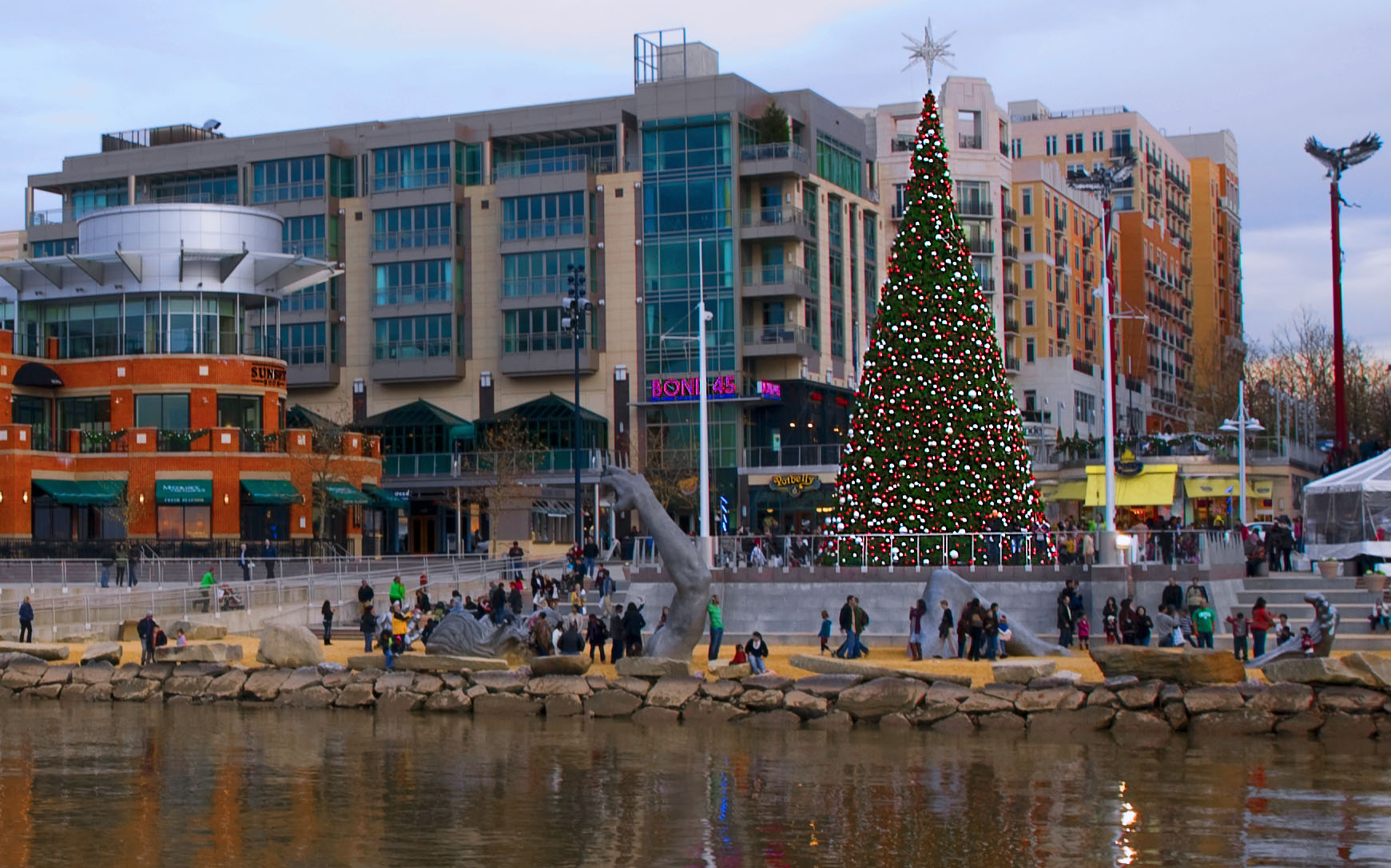
The statue with a Christmas tree behind it

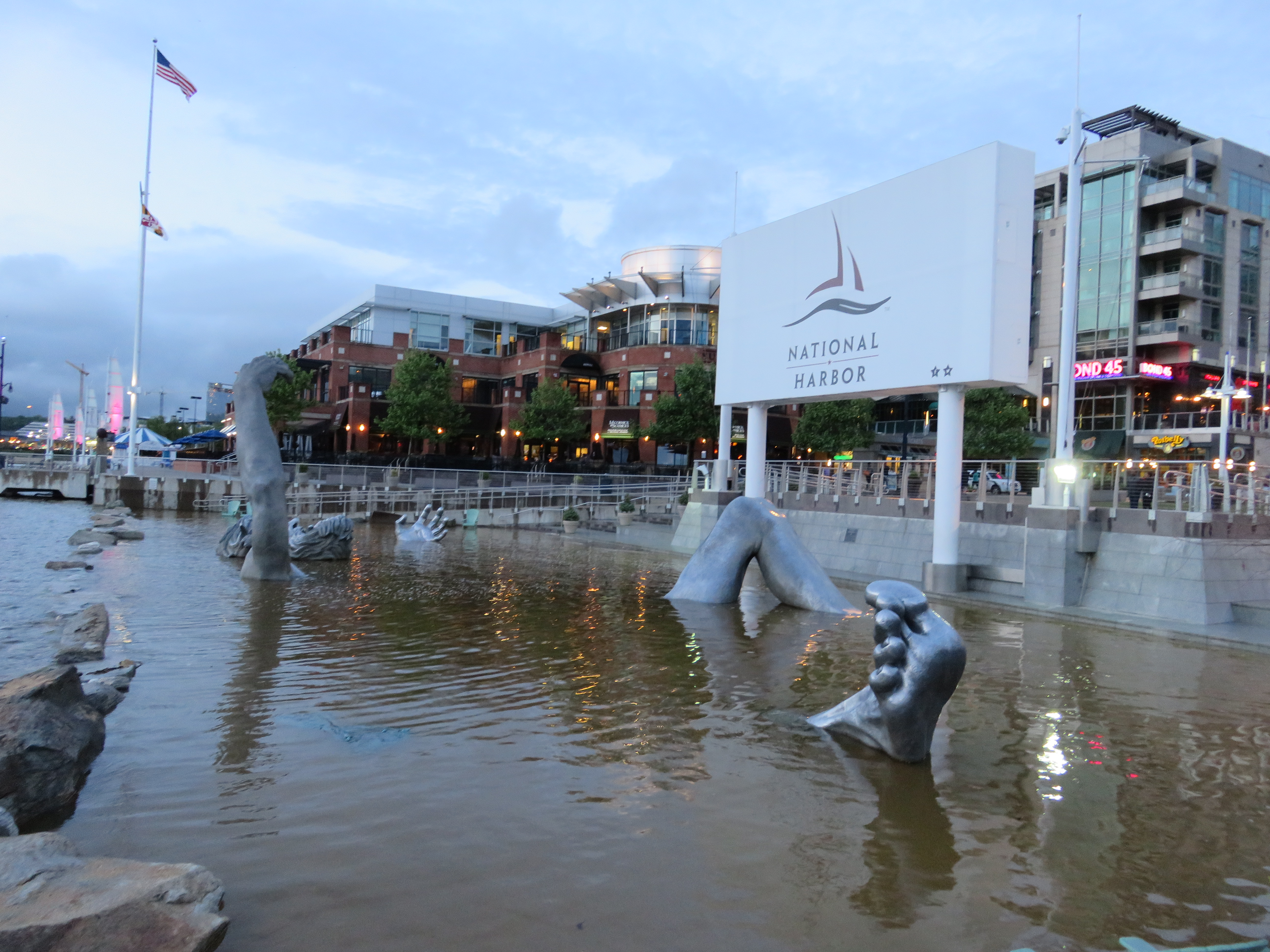
The statue under water at National Harbor

== In popular culture ==
The statue was featured in the beginning of the 1995 Hollywood film The Net and in the 1997 political thriller Shadow Conspiracy with actors Charlie Sheen and Linda Hamilton walking through the statue.

A giant buried robot inspired by the Awakening appears in the computer game Primordia, drawing on writer/designer Mark Yohalem's childhood experience playing on the sculpture.

== See also ==
- The Bassin d'Encelade (1675–1677), a similar sculpture at Versailles, France
- La Mano de Punta del Este (1982), a sculptural hand emerging from the ground in Uruguay
- Mano del Desierto (1992), a giant hand emerging from the ground in the Atacama Desert, Chile
