= La Mano de Punta del Este =

Sculpture in Uruguay

Coordinates: 34°57′28.31″S 54°56′13.85″W

La mano
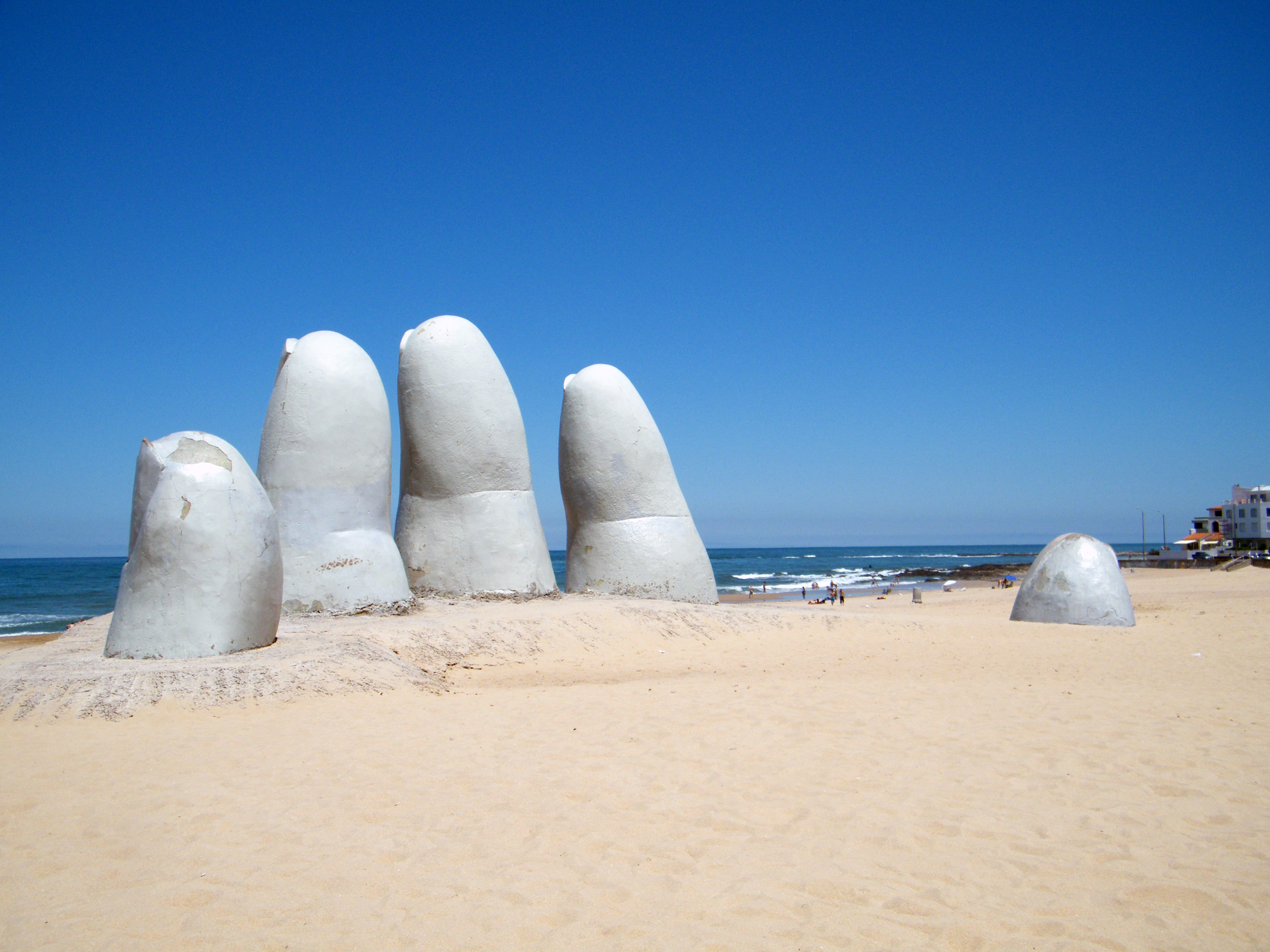
- Artist: Mario Irarrázabal
- Year: 1982
- Type: Concrete and plastic reinforced with steel
- Location: Parada 1 Brava, Punta del Este

La Mano (The Hand) is a sculpture in Punta del Este by Chilean artist Mario Irarrázabal. It depicts five human fingers partially emerging from sand and is located on Parada 1 at Brava Beach in Punta del Este, a popular tourist town in Uruguay. It is also known as either Los Dedos (The Fingers), or Hombre emergiendo a la vida (Man Emerging into Life). In English, its popular name is The Hand.

It is a famous sculpture that has become a symbol for Punta del Este since its completion in February 1982 and in turn has become one of Uruguay's most recognizable landmarks.

== History ==
The sculpture was made by Chilean artist Mario Irarrázabal during the summer of 1982 , while he was attending the first annual International Meeting of Modern Sculpture in the Open Air in Punta del Este. There were nine sculptors, and he was the youngest one. There was a fight for the places assigned on a public square, so he decided to make his sculpture on the beach. He was inspired to make a sculpture of a hand "drowning" as a warning to swimmers, as the waters at La Barra up the beach had rougher waves which were better for surfing, while the other way, waters at Solanas were much more suited for swimming practices and windsurfing activities.

While Irarrázabal had the entire summer to complete the project, he managed to finish in the first six days, despite facing minor delays due to the strong southeast wind which is common in Punta del Este. The concrete and plastic fingers were reinforced with steel bars, metal mesh, and a degradation-resistant solvent covering the plastic on the outside.

Throughout that summer, sculptors from around the world worked on their creations at the beach, but only Irarrázabal's continues to sit on the beach today, not having left its original spot, and remaining largely untouched. It gained Irarrázabal worldwide acclaim and is popularized by tourist photographs and reproductions on postcards. He later made near or exact replicas of the sculpture for the city of Madrid (in 1987), the Mano del Desierto (Hand of the Desert) in the Atacama Desert in Chile (1992), and in Venice (1995).

== See also ==
- The Awakening, a 1980 sculpture that also features hands emerging from the ground
- Mano del Desierto, a 1992 sculpture of a giant hand by the same artist
