= National Harbor, Maryland =

National Harbor
- Census-designated place
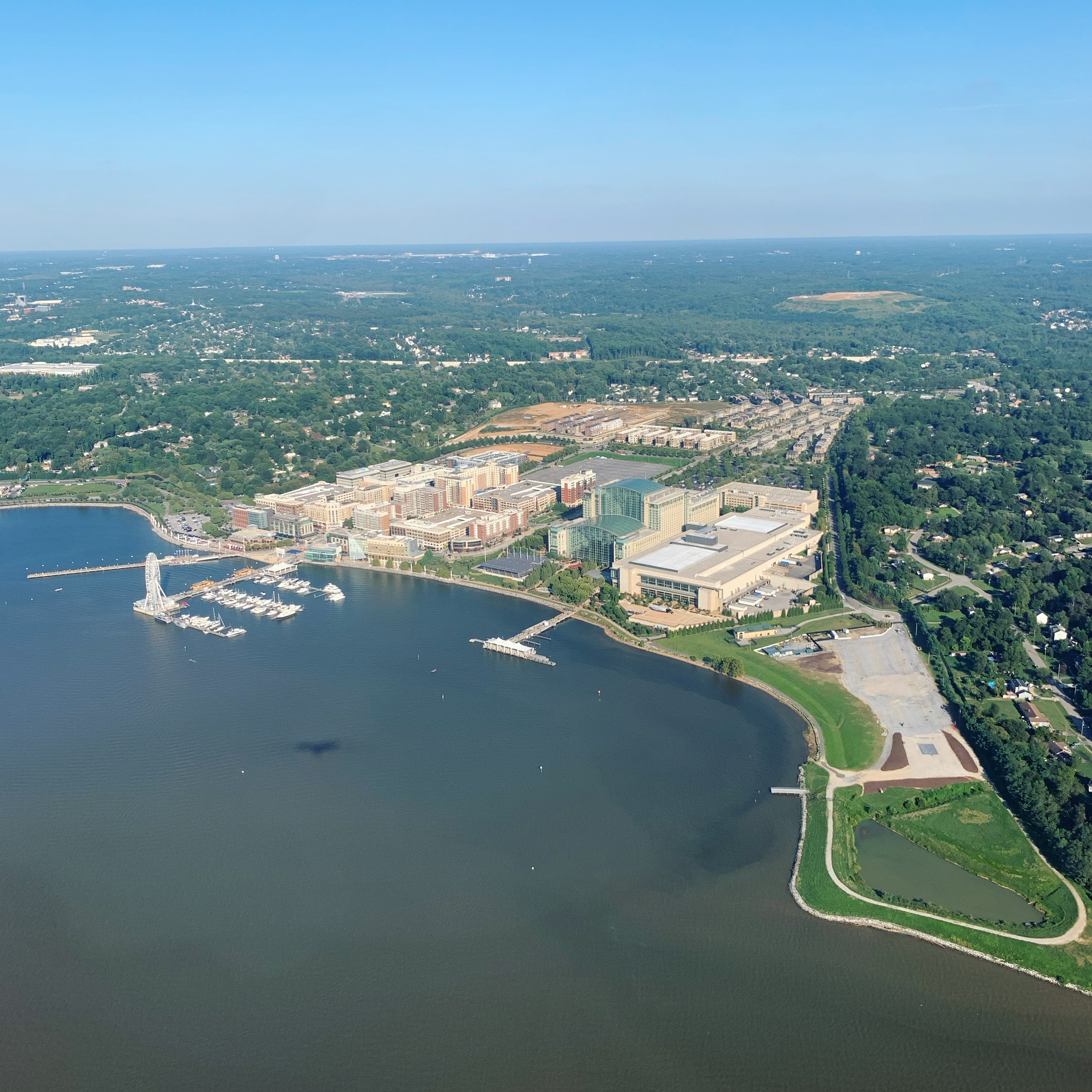
- National Harbor in September 2021

- Flag Logo

- Location of National Harbor in Maryland National Harbor (the United States)
- Coordinates: 38°47′03″N 77°00′59″W
- Country: United States
- State: Maryland
- County: Prince George's
- Unincorporated area: Oxon Hill

Area
  - Total: 1.67 sq mi (4.32 km^{2})
  - Land: 1.27 sq mi (3.30 km^{2})
  - Water: 0.39 sq mi (1.02 km^{2})

Population (2020)
  - Total: 5,509
  - Density: 4,328.6/sq mi (1,671.28/km^{2})
- Time zone: UTC−5 (Eastern (EST))
  - Summer (DST): UTC−4 (EDT)
- ZIP Code: 20745
- Area codes: 301, 240
- FIPS code: 24-55018
- GNIS ID locale/CDP: 2426650/2583665
- Website: Official website

National Harbor is a census-designated place (CDP) in Prince George's County, Maryland, United States, located along the Potomac River near the Woodrow Wilson Bridge and just south of Washington, D.C. It originated as a 300-acre (1.2 km^{2}) multi-use waterfront development. The population was 5,509 at the 2020 census.

The developer, Peterson Companies, says National Harbor draws 12 million visitors annually, as of 2025.

== History ==
=== Land use and rezoning ===
The land developed for National Harbor was previously Salubria Plantation, built in 1827 by Dr. John H. Bayne. The plantation house burned down in 1981 and was offered for sale along with the surrounding land. The land was sold in 1984 and in 1994 was rezoned for mixed-use development. In the fall of 1997, the Maryland Department of the Environment and the Army Corps of Engineers approved new developer permits, granted for the PortAmerica project in 1988.

The National Harbor proposal drew criticism for degrading the surrounding environment. In 1999, the Sierra Club said the project would "prevent forever the completion of the Potomac Heritage Trail".

In 2006, Peterson Companies withdrew plans to build a Target department store where the remaining plantation building, the slave quarters, still stand.

=== Development ===
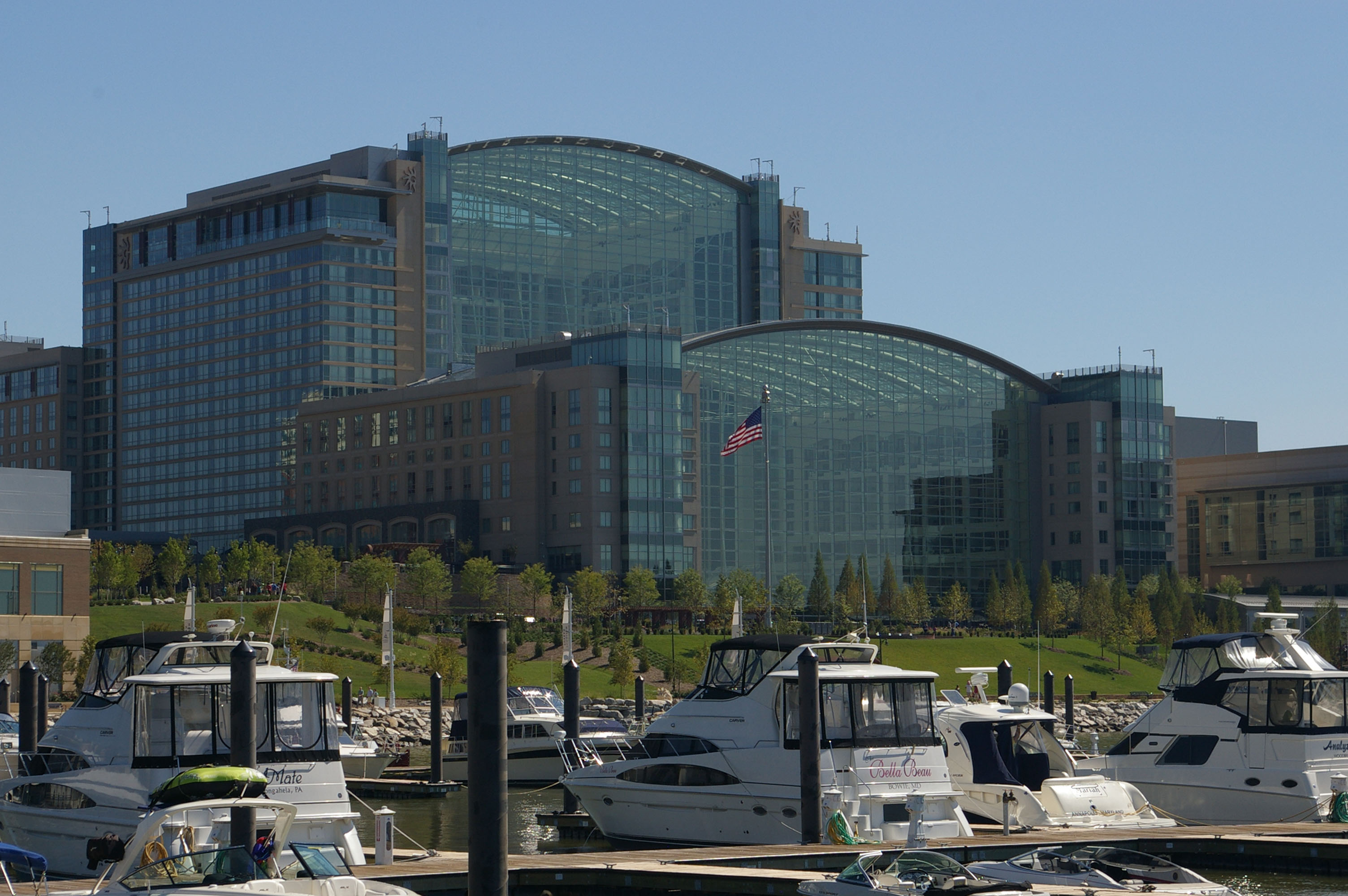
Gaylord National Resort & Convention Center

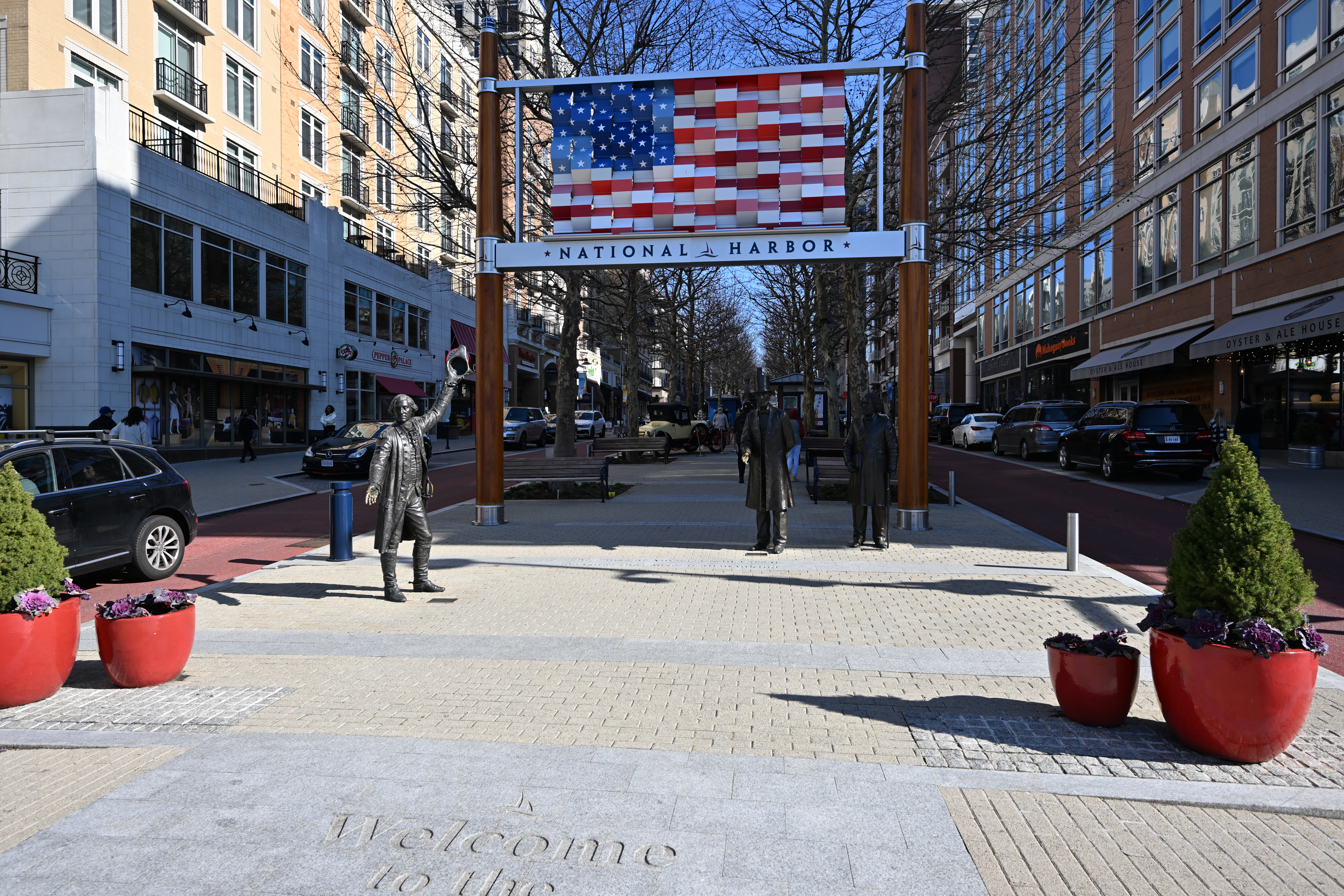
The pedestrian walkway has statues and figures of famous American and global celebrities, including George Washington, Marilyn Monroe, and Henry Ford.

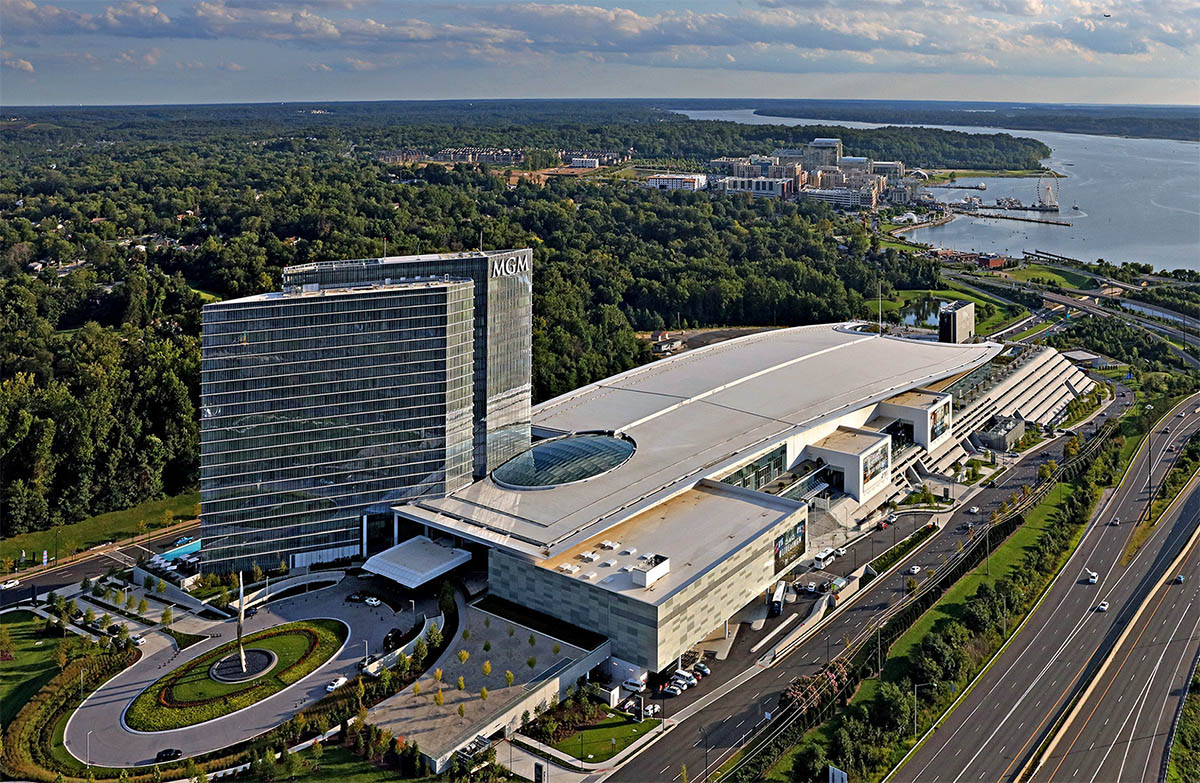
Aerial view of MGM National Harbor, looking towards National Harbor

The Gaylord National Resort & Convention Center at National Harbor opened on April 1, 2008 in what was then Oxon Hill, Maryland. Within months of its opening, the site discharged hundreds of thousands of gallons of untreated sewage into the Potomac River.

The site around the Gaylord hotel was developed by Milton Peterson's Peterson Companies. The original plan was to spend over $2 billion and to build from 2007 to late 2014. As of April 2016 construction was continuing and the cost was set at $4 billion.

In 2010, the development was designated as its own census-designated place separate from Oxon Hill.

The Walt Disney Company had announced that it would build a new resort hotel at National Harbor, but backed out of the project in November 2011.

In 2011, Bonnie Bick, a member of the Campaign to Reinvest in the Heart of Oxon Hill suggested preserving the remaining plantation building, and making it a part of a proposed historical loop of the Potomac Heritage National Scenic Trail, as a draw for the development.

The National Children's Museum opened in National Harbor in December 2012. Just over two years later, the museum announced that it would move back to Washington, D.C., and close the Mayland facility.

On November 29, 2012, ground was broken for a Tanger Outlets shopping facility a mile east of the National Harbor waterfront, which opened in November 2013. The Capital Wheel ferris wheel opened in the mid-year of 2014.

An MGM-branded casino, called MGM National Harbor, opened at National Harbor on December 8, 2016, four years after voters approved the expansion of gambling in the state. It was built on the south side of the Beltway, about a mile northeast of the National Harbor waterfront.

On January 12, 2015, Peterson Companies announced that Local Motors planned to open a showroom in National Harbor. On June 17, 2016, it opened to the public and debuted a new vehicle named Olli. Housed in the former site of the children's museum, the showroom includes interactive STEM labs for children and a shop that sells company merchandise.

On October 21, 2023, Titanic: The Exhibition, a museum in National Harbor, was opened to the public. It features sculptures, models, and artifacts from the RMS Titanic.

In October 2026, the Prince George's County Council approved a proposal to spend $215 million to construct a Sphere venue at National Harbor.

== Facilities ==
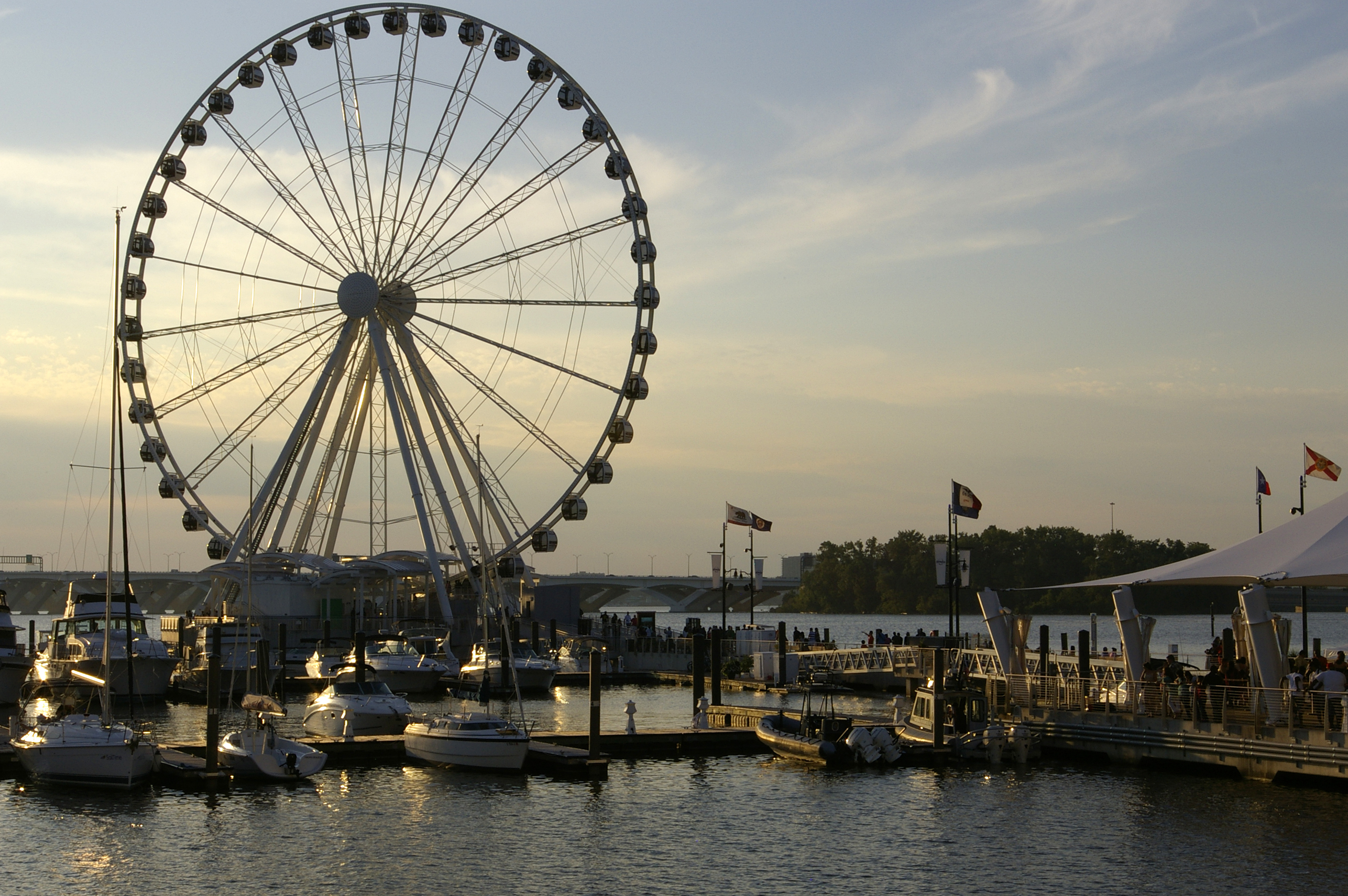
Capital Wheel, a ferris wheel at National Harbor

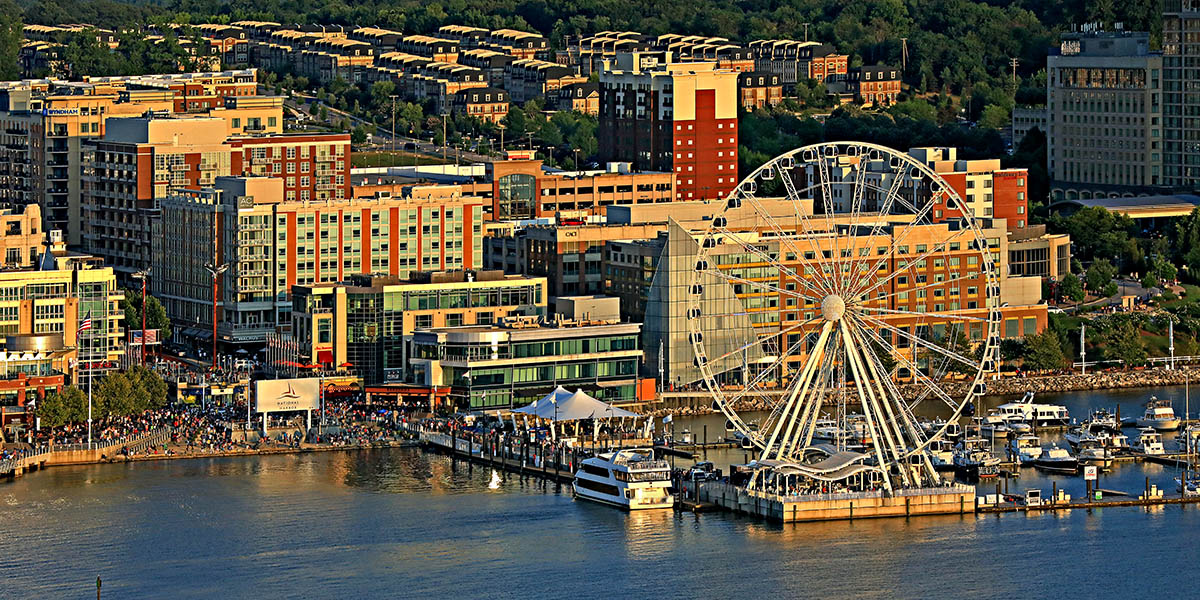
An aerial view of National Harbor

The site has a convention center, six hotels, restaurants, shops, and condominiums. National Harbor hosted Cirque du Soleil in 2008, 2010, 2012, and 2014 and also features outdoor activities such as a culinary festival and outdoor concerts by military bands, an outdoor movie screen facing the river, an annual ice sculpture exhibition, and a Peeps Day with a Peeps eating contest. The national spelling bee competition is held there. The Gaylord National Resort & Convention Center, with 2,000 rooms, is the largest hotel between New Jersey and Florida, and the largest in the Washington area. The site includes a beachfront walking path and a connection to a bike trail on the Woodrow Wilson Bridge that crosses into Alexandria, Virginia. Amusements include a children's carousel, and the Capital Wheel, a 175-foot Ferris wheel on a pier that extends into the Potomac River. There is a fast food restaurant and a gas station among the northern ramps that provide the only ways in or out of National Harbor.

In December 2016, MGM Resorts opened MGM National Harbor, a 300-room hotel as well as a 135,000-square-foot (12,500 m^{2}) casino, stores, a spa, restaurants, a 1,200-seat theater, a 35,000-square-foot (3,300 m^{2}) convention area, and a 5,000-square-foot (460 m^{2}) parking garage.

== Demographics ==
Historical population
Census	Pop.	Note	%±
2010	3,788		—
2020	5,509		45.4%
U.S. Decennial Census; 2010 2020

National Harbor first appeared as a census designated place in the 2010 U.S. census formed from part of the Fort Washington CDP.

National Harbor CDP, Maryland – Racial and ethnic composition Note: the US Census treats Hispanic/Latino as an ethnic category. This table excludes Latinos from the racial categories and assigns them to a separate category. Hispanics/Latinos may be of any race.
Race / Ethnicity (NH = Non-Hispanic)	Pop 2010	Pop 2020	% 2010	% 2020
White alone (NH)	496	813	13.09%	14.76%
Black or African American alone (NH)	2,411	2,984	63.65%	54.17%
Native American or Alaska Native alone (NH)	4	6	0.11%	0.11%
Asian alone (NH)	409	437	10.80%	7.93%
Native Hawaiian or Pacific Islander alone (NH)	2	2	0.05%	0.04%
Other race alone (NH)	17	59	0.45%	1.07%
Mixed race or Multiracial (NH)	93	226	2.46%	4.10%
Hispanic or Latino (any race)	356	982	9.40%	17.83%
Total	3,788	5,509	100.00%	100.00%

=== 2020 census ===
As of the 2020 census, National Harbor had a population of 5,509. The median age was 41.7 years. 16.2% of residents were under the age of 18 and 14.2% of residents were 65 years of age or older. For every 100 females there were 94.5 males, and for every 100 females age 18 and over there were 92.9 males age 18 and over.

100.0% of residents lived in urban areas, while 0.0% lived in rural areas.

There were 2,540 households in National Harbor, of which 20.5% had children under the age of 18 living in them. Of all households, 31.8% were married-couple households, 26.2% were households with a male householder and no spouse or partner present, and 36.2% were households with a female householder and no spouse or partner present. About 40.8% of all households were made up of individuals and 9.2% had someone living alone who was 65 years of age or older.

There were 2,851 housing units, of which 10.9% were vacant. The homeowner vacancy rate was 4.2% and the rental vacancy rate was 12.1%.

=== 2010 census ===
As of the census of 2010, there were 3,788 people, 1,598 households, and 868 families residing in the census-designated place.

=== Demographic estimates ===
In 2016, prior to the opening of the MGM Casino, an estimated 7,000 staff worked at National Harbor.

== Geography ==
According to the U.S. Census Bureau, National Harbor has a total area of 1.9 square miles (4.8 km^{2}), of which 1.4 square miles (3.7 km^{2}) is land and 0.39 square miles (1.0 km^{2}), or 21.7% (consisting of the Potomac River), is water; 300 acres are in the actual development itself.

=== Access ===
The only routes in or out of National Harbor are ramps north of the area that link it to Interstate 95/495 (the Capital Beltway), Interstate 295 (Anacostia Freeway), and Oxon Hill Road. Commuters traveling on Indian Head Highway can reach National Harbor using the Oxon Hill Road exits. In 2007, the state spent more than $500 million (~$747 million in 2025) to improve roads for the 10,000 cars that were expected to commute daily to National Harbor.

A water taxi line run by the Potomac Riverboat Company connects National Harbor to Alexandria, Virginia. The City of Alexandria also runs shuttles from the water taxi terminal to King Street–Old Town station at an annual cost of about $800,000.

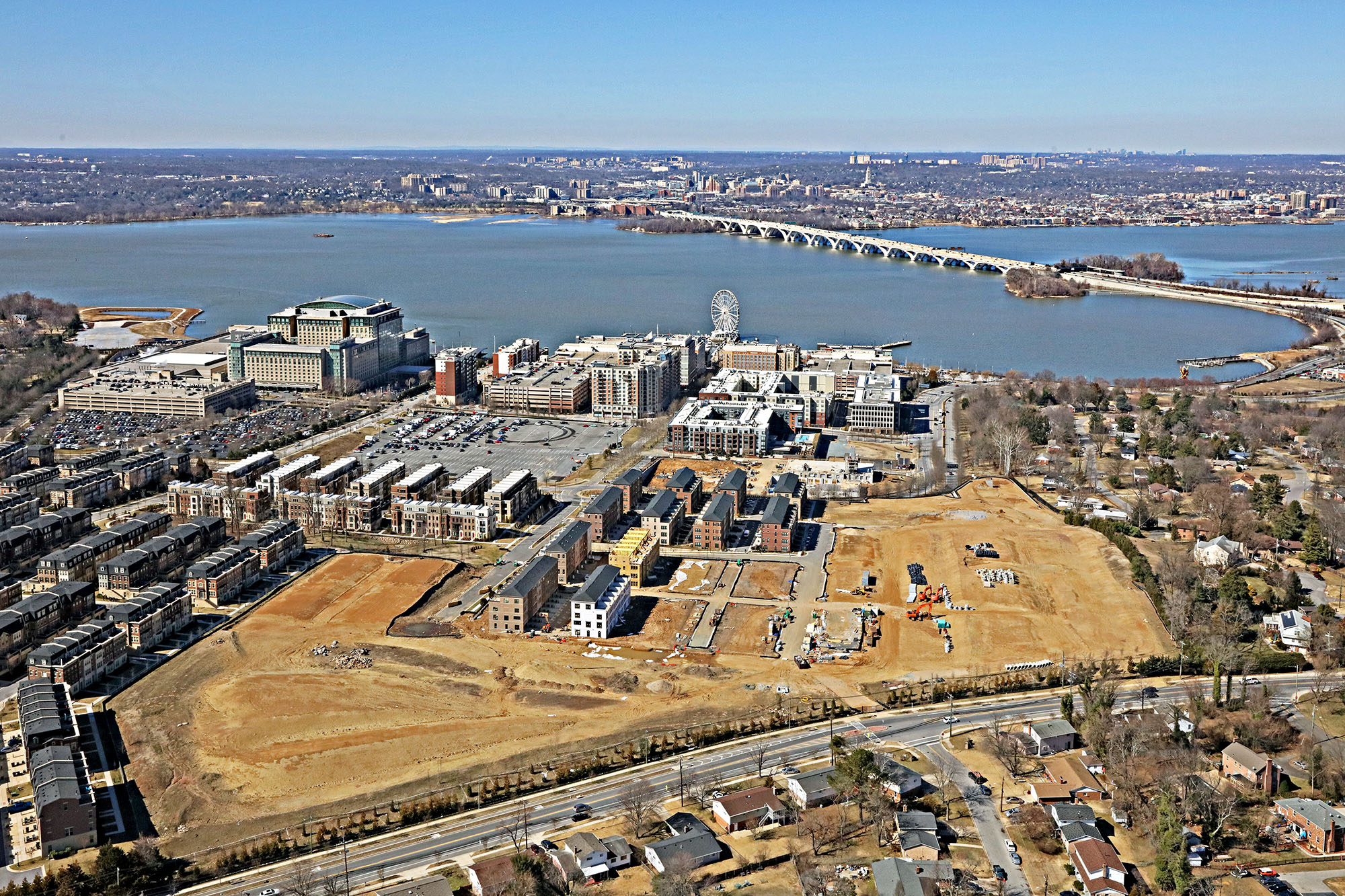
National Harbor with the Potomac River and Alexandria, Virginia in the background

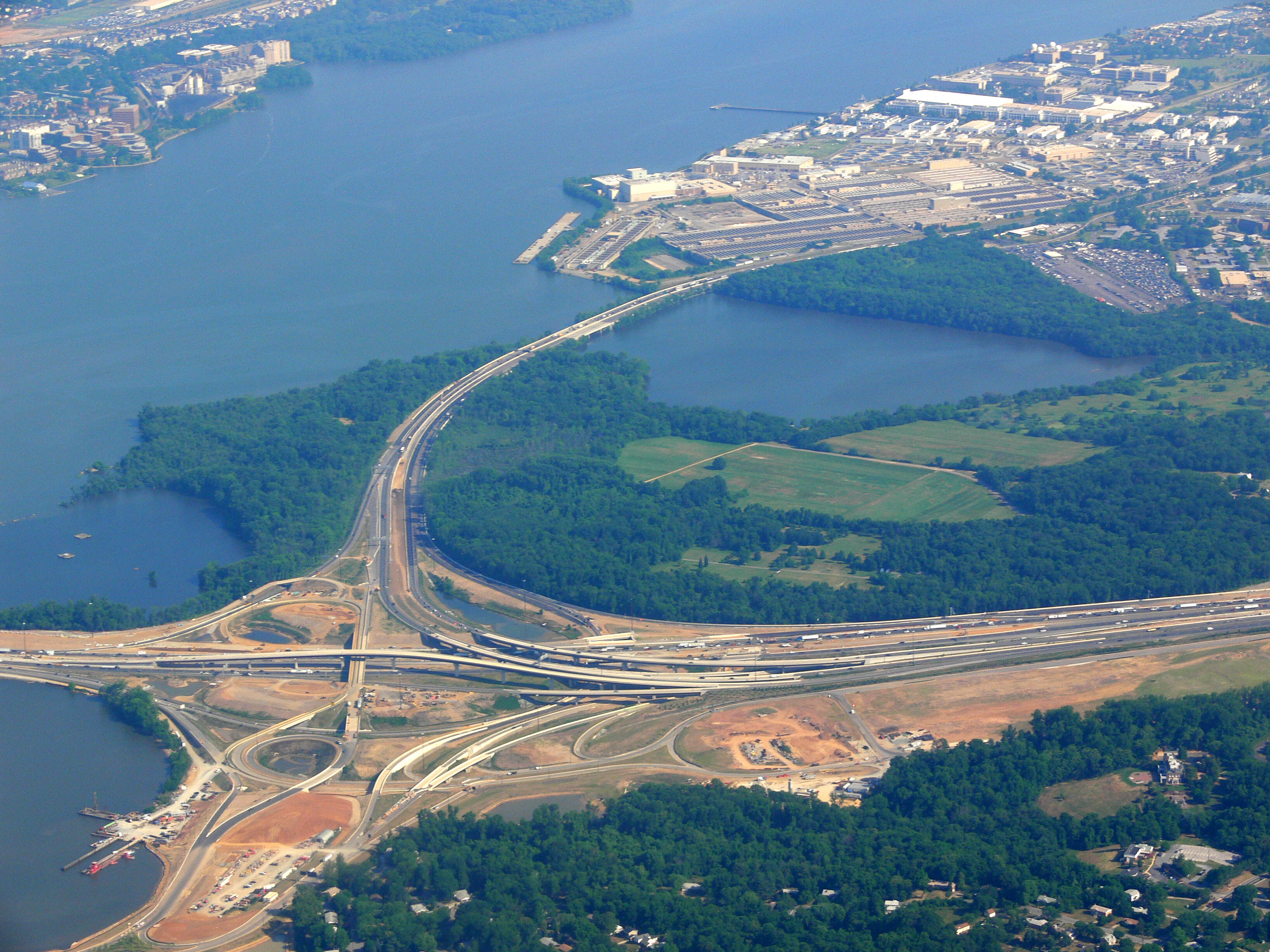
Start of construction for National Harbor (lower left) at the junction of the Capital Beltway and the southern terminus of the Anacostia Freeway; the Woodrow Wilson Bridge is just off the picture to the left.

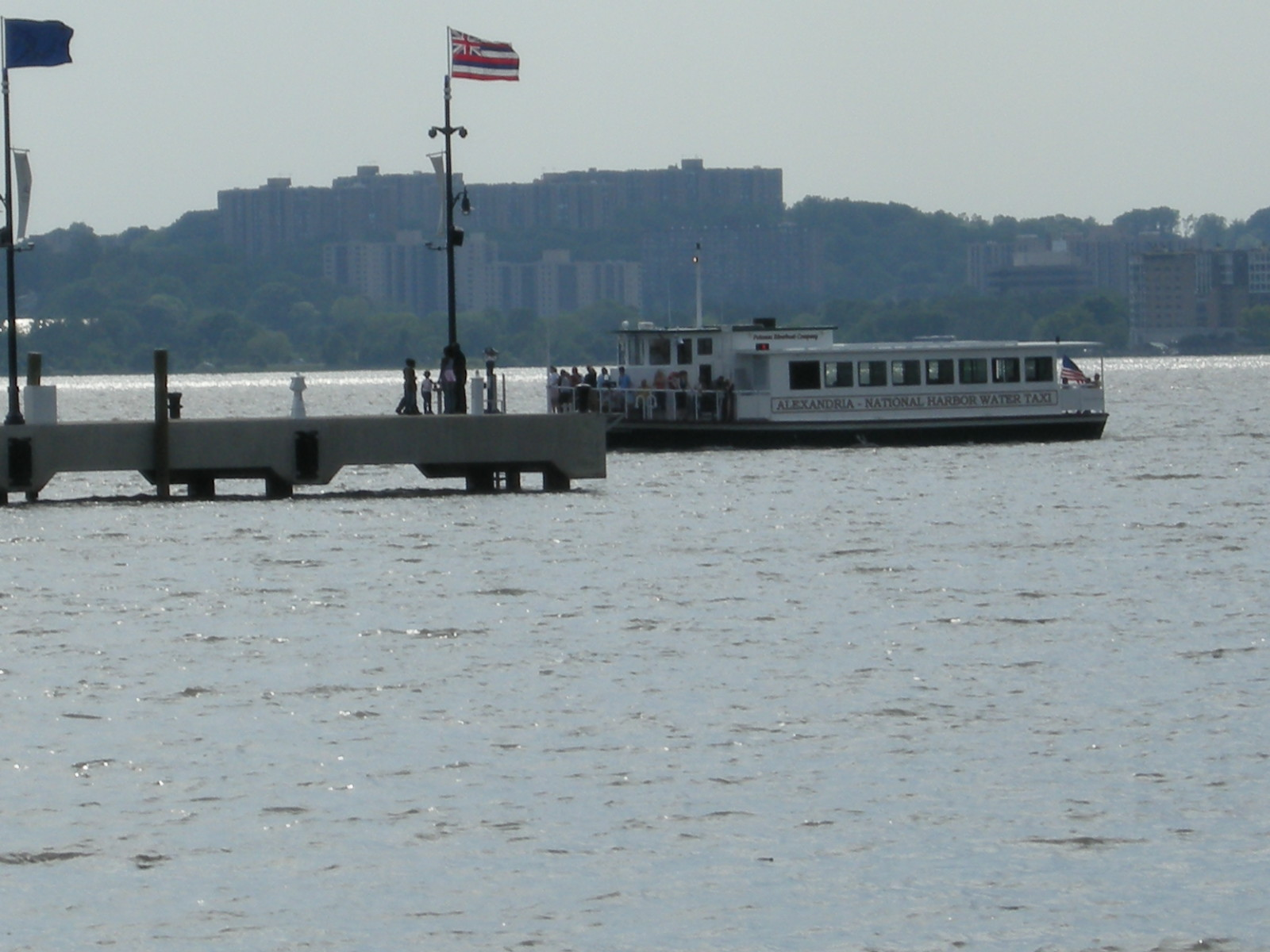
A water taxi from National Harbor to Alexandria, Virginia

=== Proposals for Metrorail service ===
During planning, critics said National Harbor would be too remote from the Washington Metro, the Washington area's rapid transit system. Local civic groups sued National Harbor's developer, then settled in 2004 for promises of investment in the surrounding community and better access to mass transit.

The Woodrow Wilson Bridge, which forms part of the Capital Beltway near National Harbor, was built to handle the addition of a Washington Metro line. No such plans exist. The state of Maryland pays the Washington Metropolitan Area Transit Authority $312,000 annually to operate the NH1 bus line to National Harbor from the Southern Avenue Metro station. In June 2008, the Gaylord National Resort and Convention Center asked the state to fund additional transit service because employees found it difficult to reach National Harbor. In 2011, Metro began considering a rail extension to National Harbor off the Green Line as part of its long-term plan.

The NH2 bus line started running across the Woodrow Wilson Bridge in 2016, connecting with the King Street–Old Town station.

In September 2021, a report on the Blue/Orange/Silver lines recommended converting the Blue Line into a circle line, extending it to National Harbor and Alexandria. In 2022, a NBC4 Washington report suggested the loop might alleviate crowding at the Rosslyn station.

== Education ==
National Harbor is part of the Prince George's County Public Schools district.

Schools serving National Harbor include Fort Foote Elementary School, Oxon Hill Middle School, and Oxon Hill High School.

== Gallery ==
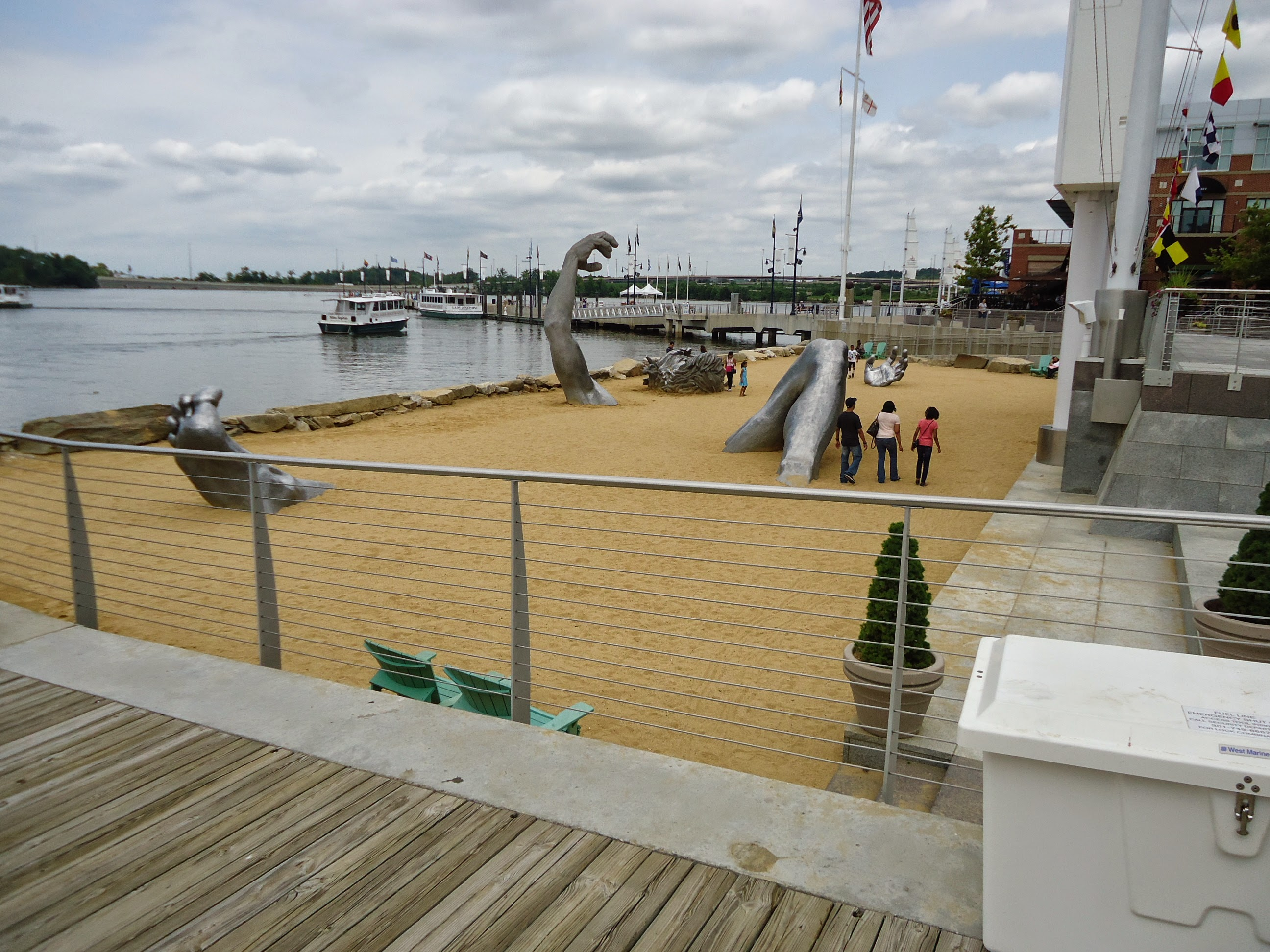
The Awakening, an unusual sculpture in National Harbor

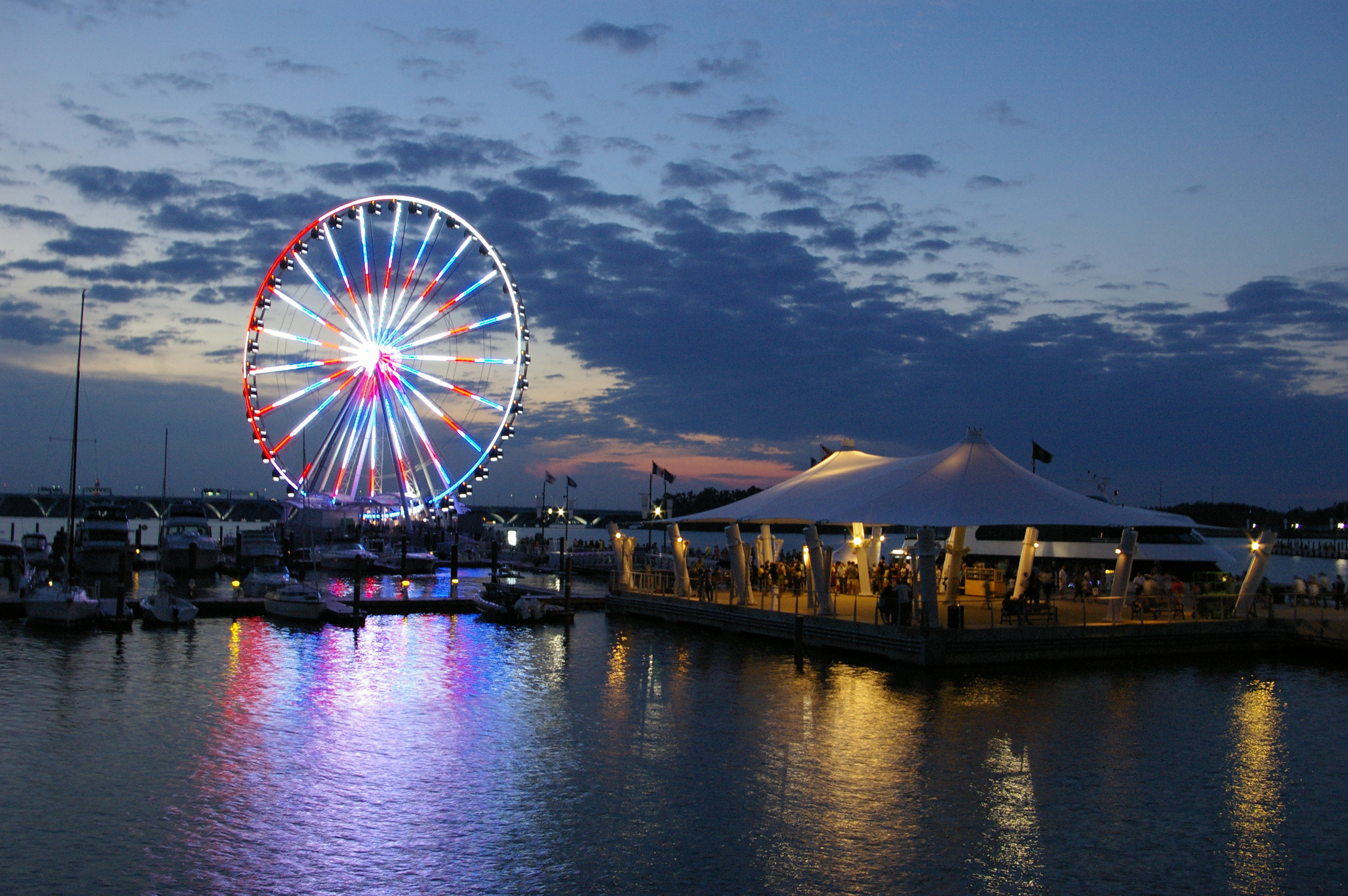
Capital Wheel at night

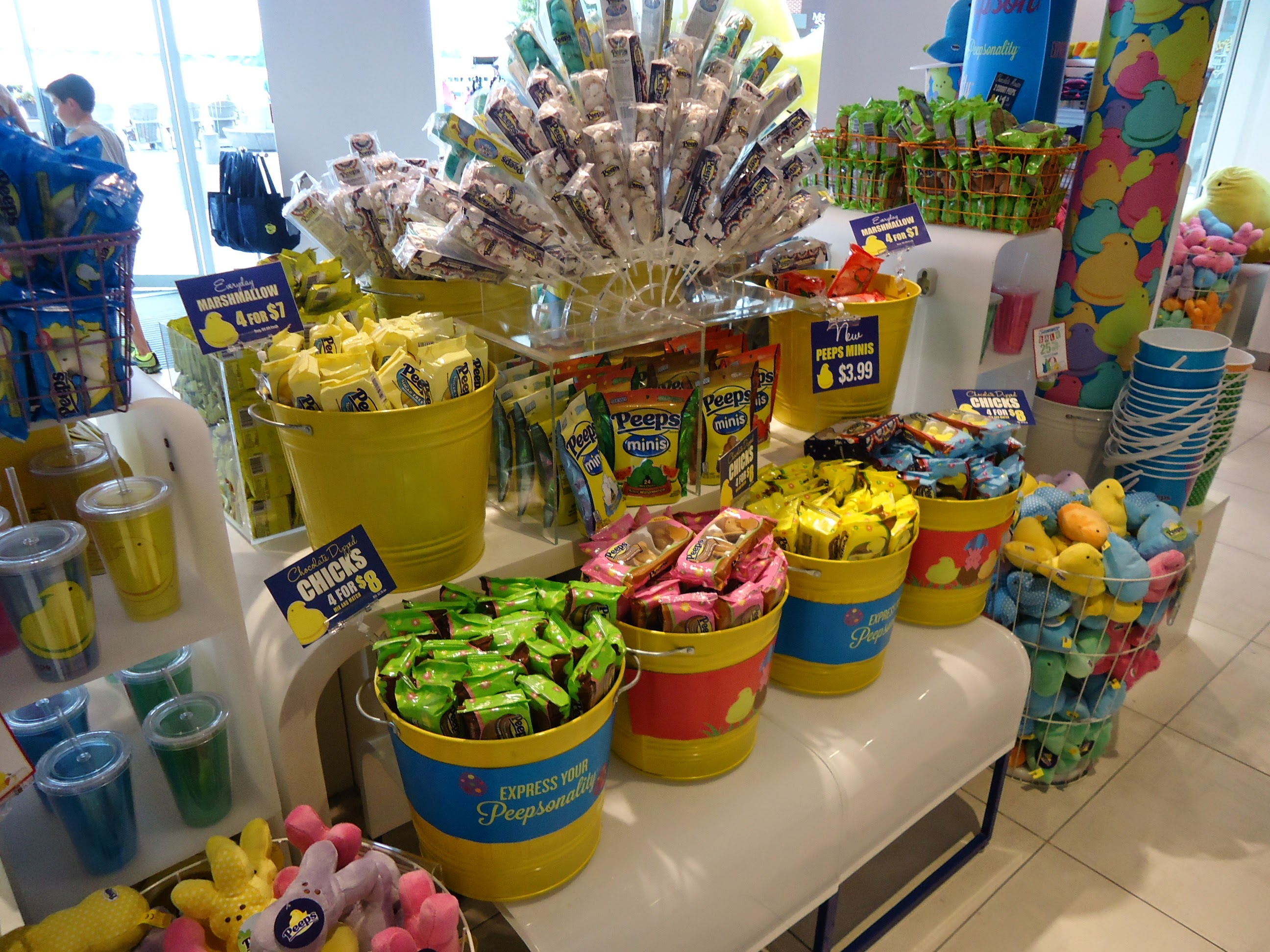
Peeps store

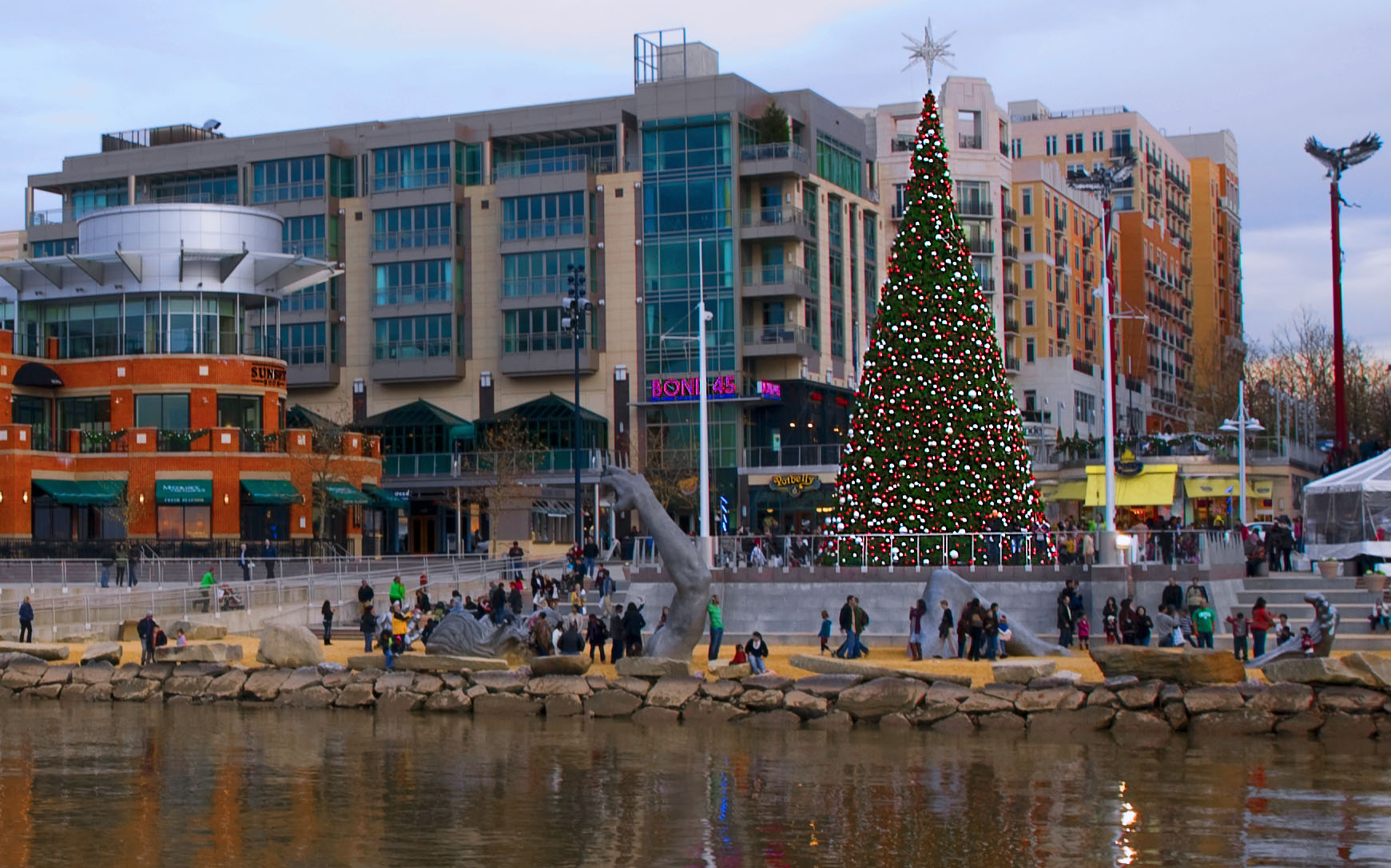
A Christmas Tree in National Harbor in 2011

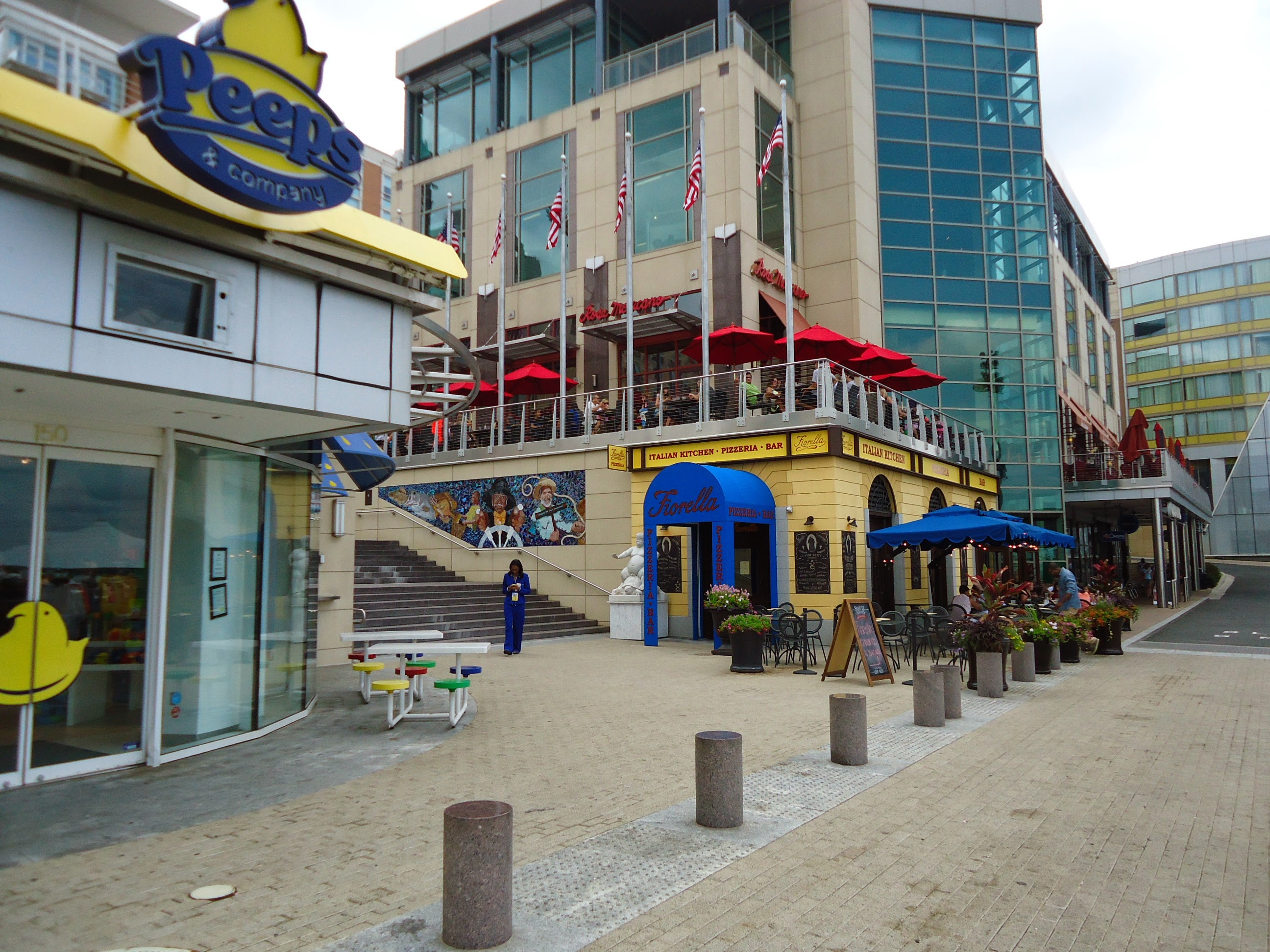
National Harbor stores and restaurants

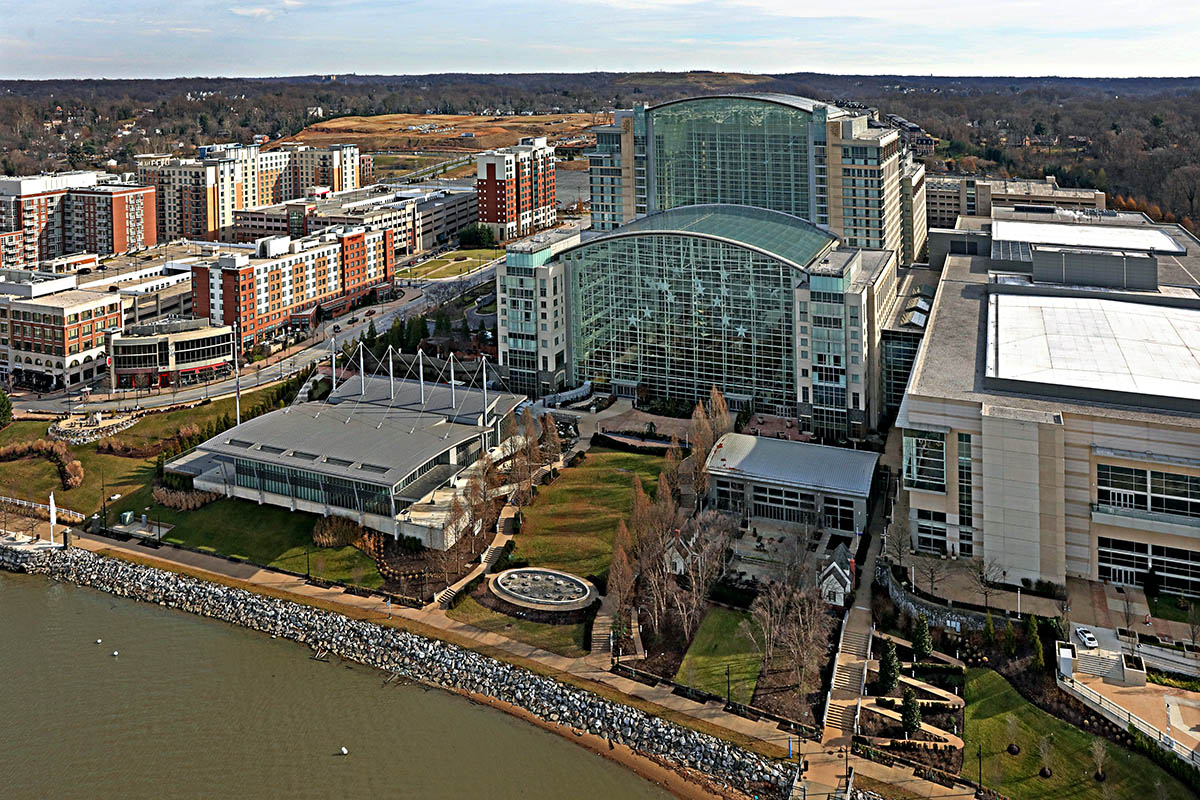
Aerial view of the Gaylord National Resort & Convention Center

== Panorama ==
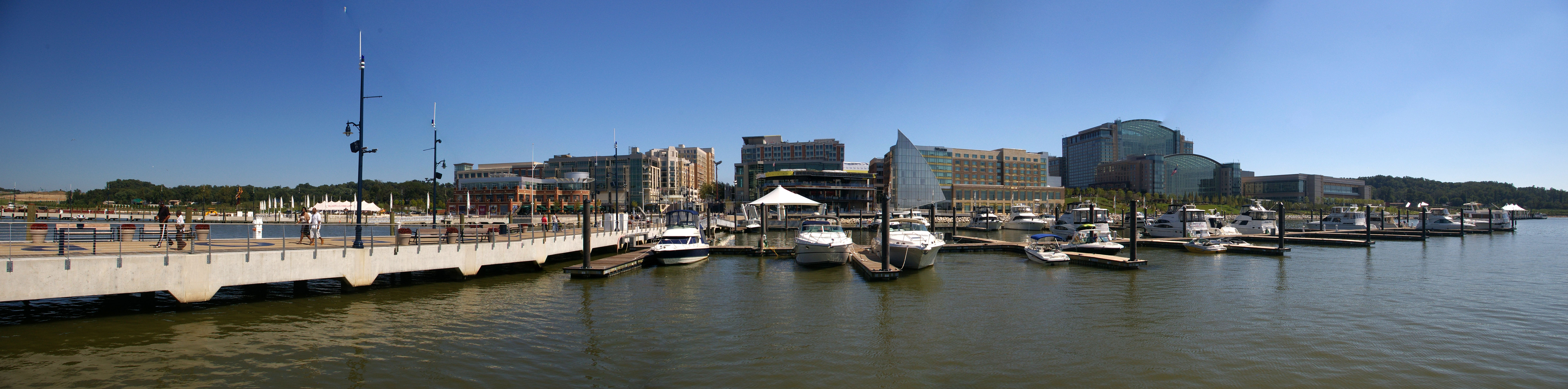
Panorama of National Harbor

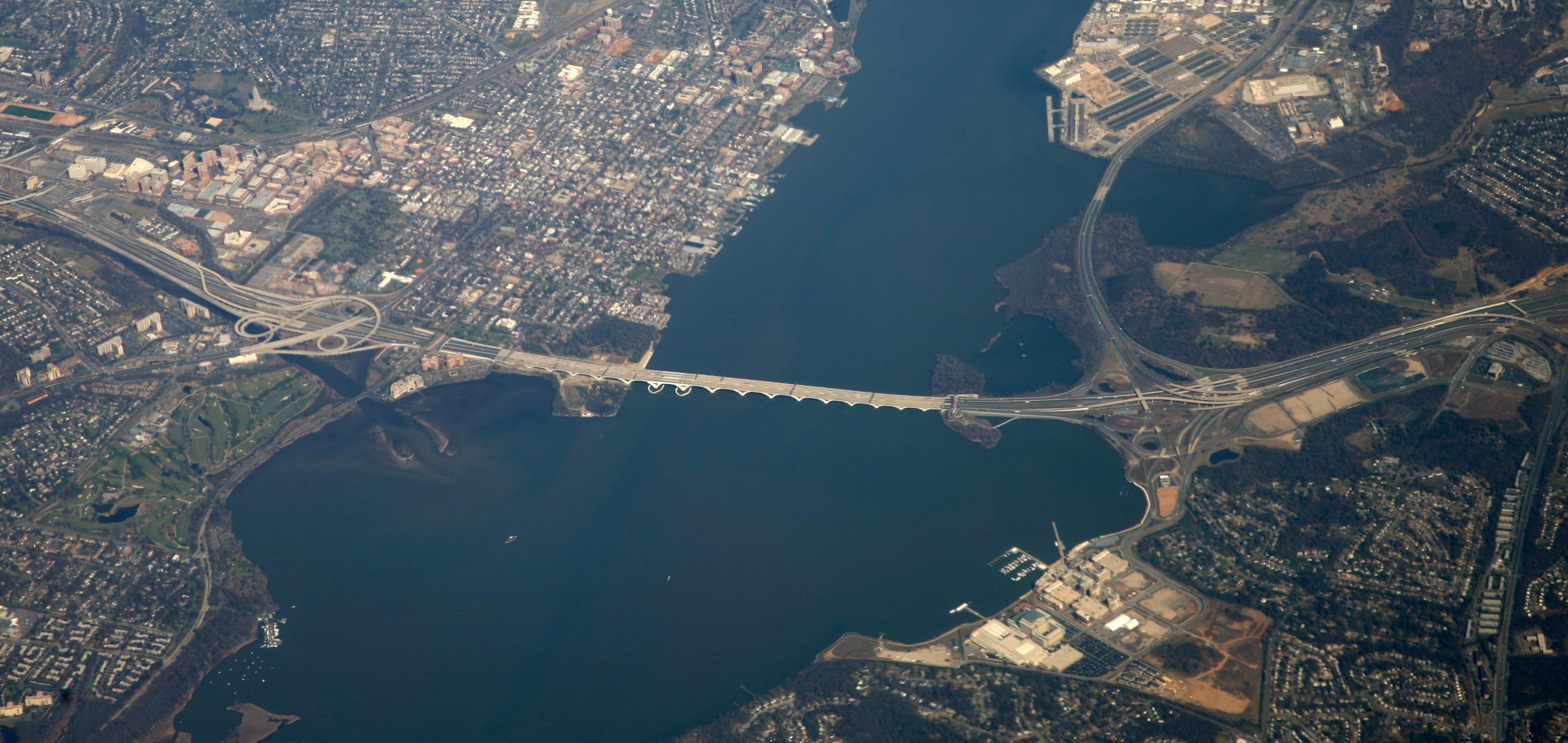
An aerial view of National Harbor in 2012 with Alexandria, Virginia (on left), the Wilson Bridge crossing the Potomac River to Maryland (in center), the Anacostia Freeway extending north to Washington, D.C. from National Harbor (on top), and the casino site (the rectangular area east of the interchange)

== See also ==
- Oxon Hill Manor
