= Capital Wheel =

Ferris wheel at National Harbor, Maryland

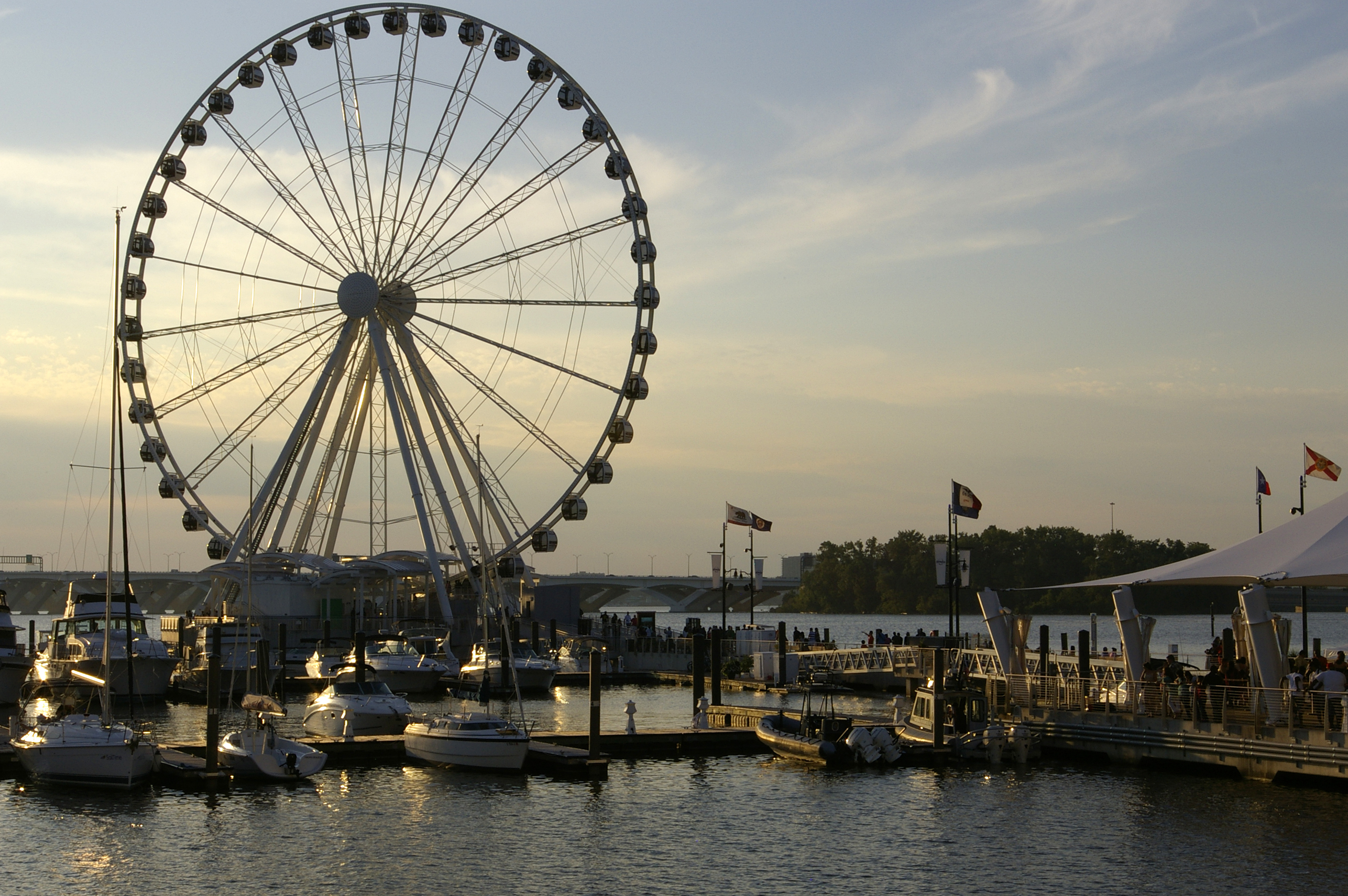
- Capital Wheel at National Harbor
- Interactive map of the Capital Wheel area

General information
- Status: Operating
- Type: Ferris wheel
- Location: National Harbor, Maryland
- Coordinates: 38°47′08″N 77°01′09″W
- Opened: May 23, 2014

Height
- Height: 175 feet (53 m)

Website
- thecapitalwheel.com

The Capital Wheel is a Ferris wheel at National Harbor, Maryland, just outside Washington, D.C., in the United States. It opened on May 23, 2014.

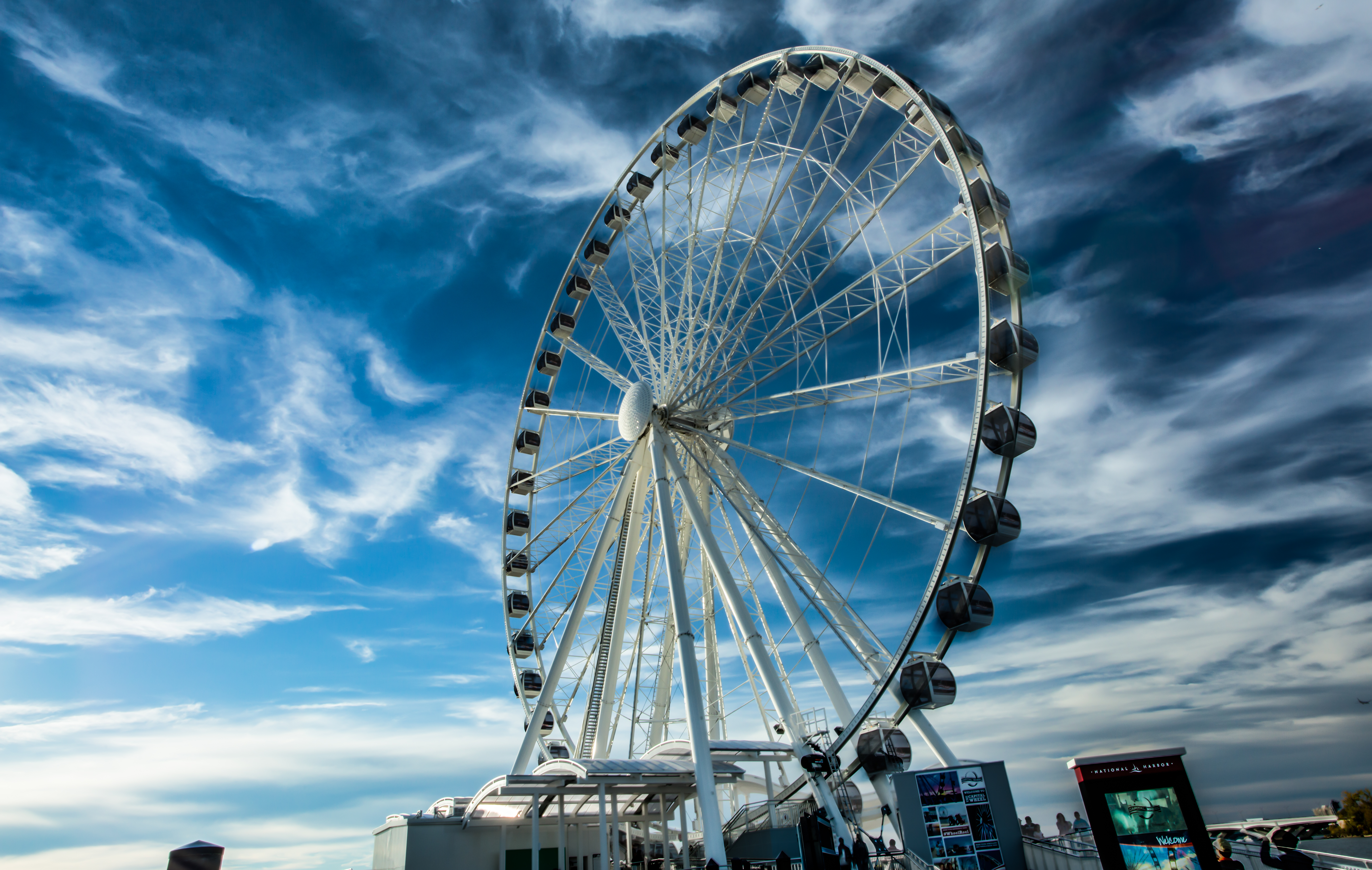
The Capital Wheel in 2014

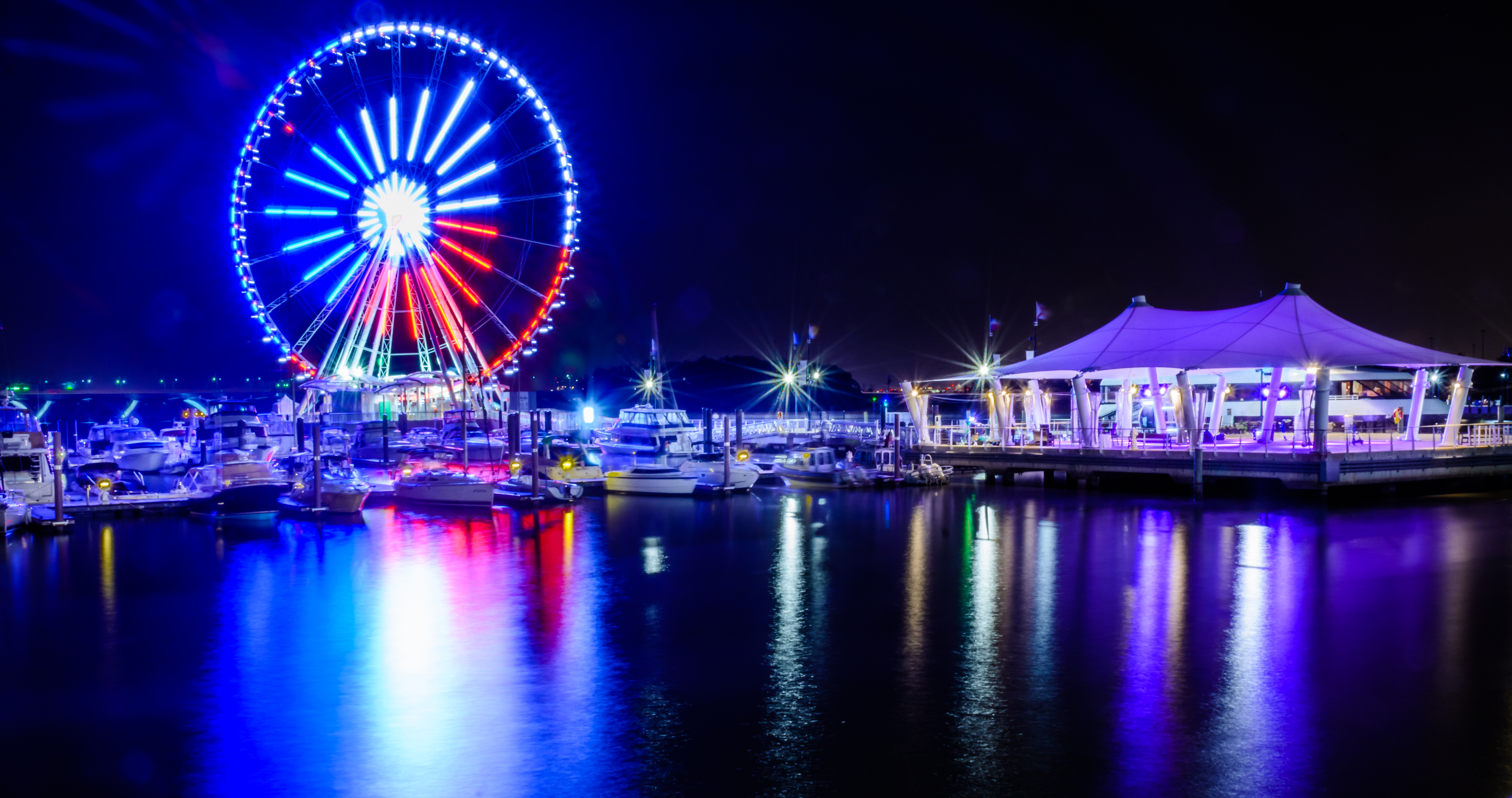
The Capital Wheel has 42 climate-controlled gondolas. The wheel has 1.6 million fully programmable LED lights

The wheel was conceived by National Harbor developer Milton Peterson and inspired by the Roue de Paris. Built by Chance Rides of Wichita, Kansas, it has an overall height of 180 feet (54.9 m) and sits on a 770-foot-long (230 m) pier extending into the adjacent Potomac River, easily visible to passengers on flights to or from National Airport. Landmarks visible from inside the wheel include the National Harbor, the Washington Monument, the city of Alexandria, and Georgetown University. The 165-foot (50.3 m) diameter wheel carries 42 climate-controlled passenger gondolas, each able to seat eight people, including a VIP gondola that can be rented for weddings or celebrations. The wheel has programmable special-effects lighting and seasonal concessions at the base of the ride from the Wolfgang Puck restaurant chain.

The entire structure is 175 (52.6 m) feet tall.

== Design and construction ==
The Capital Wheel arrived at National Harbor by two of Cianbro's barges on February 18, 2014, pushed by a tugboat from Baltimore to National Harbor via the Chesapeake Bay and Potomac River. Smith's Shipyard provided the 1,300 horsepower tug, named The Rising Sun and measuring 60 feet long by 22 feet wide (18.3m by 6.7m). Flexifloat made the two barges that Cianbro used to transport The Capital Wheel, one for the materials, measuring 50 feet (15 m) wide by 140 feet (43 m) long by 7 feet (2.1 m) deep, and one for the crane that lifted the components from the barge to the pier, measuring 60 feet (18 m) wide by 120 feet (37 m) long by 7 feet (2.1 m) deep. Cianbro's Manitowoc 4100 Series 2 crane has a maximum lifting capacity of 460,000 pounds.

The materials barge carried 280,000 pounds (130,000 kg) of galvanized steel base and tower legs and other miscellaneous components weighing 120,000 pounds (54,000 kg) for The Capital Wheel.

The Capital Wheel weighs approximately 320 tons (281,227 kg), exclusive of the base, which weighs an additional 140 tons (127,006 kg). The structure's eight legs support a 95-foot (29 m) axle, which took a full day to install. Cianbro attached the Swiss-made passenger gondolas four at a time to the wheel structure, followed by a 90-degree wheel rotation, until wheel was fully assembled.

Four 50-horsepower variable drive units rotate the Wheel at a speed of 1.5 rotations per minute. Each passenger ride lasts 12–15 minutes. The Capital Wheel has 1.6 million LED lights with a spectrum of 16,387,064 colors.

== Passenger gondolas ==
The Capital Wheel has 42 climate-controlled gondolas, including one VIP gondola, and can carry 336 passengers at maximum. CWA Construction, a Swiss manufacturer, built the passenger gondolas that Cianbro installed for The Capital Wheel.

Each glass-enclosed gondola weighs 1,500 pounds (680 kg), measures approximately 6 feet long by 5 feet wide by 5 feet high (1.8m by 1.5m by 1.5m) and holds eight passengers or up to 1,380 pounds (630 kg).

The gondolas have interior lights and two-way, individual communication with the operator, and their doors open facing the harbor, for an unobstructed view of the Washington Monument, U.S. Capitol, Alexandria, Virginia, and Prince George's County, Maryland.

== Ride availability and cost ==
On its regular schedule as of June 2023, the Capital Wheel is open from 4 P.M. to 10 P.M. Monday through Thursday and 10 A.M. to 10 P.M. Friday through Sunday. Tickets cost $17 for adults and $13.50 for children. The VIP gondola costs $50 per person and can seat 4 people.
