= Mano del Desierto =

Sculpture of a hand in the Atacama Desert, Chile

Coordinates: 24°09′30.01″S 70°09′23.56″W

The Mano del Desierto is a large-scale sculpture in Chile, about 60 km to the south and east of the city of Antofagasta, on the Panamerican Highway. The nearest point of reference is the "Ciudad Empresarial La Negra" (La Negra Business City). It lies between the 1309 and 1310 km marker points on the highway. The piece references the human rights violations perpetrated by the Pinochet regime.

== Description ==
The sculpture was constructed by the Chilean sculptor Mario Irarrázabal at an altitude of 1,100 meters above sea and level. Its exaggerated size is said to emphasize human vulnerability and helplessness. The work has a base of iron and concrete, and stands 11 metres (36 ft) tall. Funded by Corporación Pro Antofagasta, a local booster organization, the sculpture was inaugurated on 28 March 1992.

It has since become a point of interest for tourists traveling Route 5, which forms part of the Pan-American Highway. It is an easy victim of graffiti and is therefore cleaned occasionally.

To get to the sculpture from Antofagasta, take Route 28 going East until the road joins Route 5 at La Negra (industrial complex) (distance from Route 1 in Antofagasta to the junction at La Negra approximately 16 kilometres (9.9 mi)). Take Route 5 going South for another 48 kilometres (30 mi), where a dirt road turns right (West) towards the sculpture. The sculpture is 450 metres (1,480 ft) from the main road. Clear signposts are placed on the road, although the sculpture can already be seen from quite a distance away.

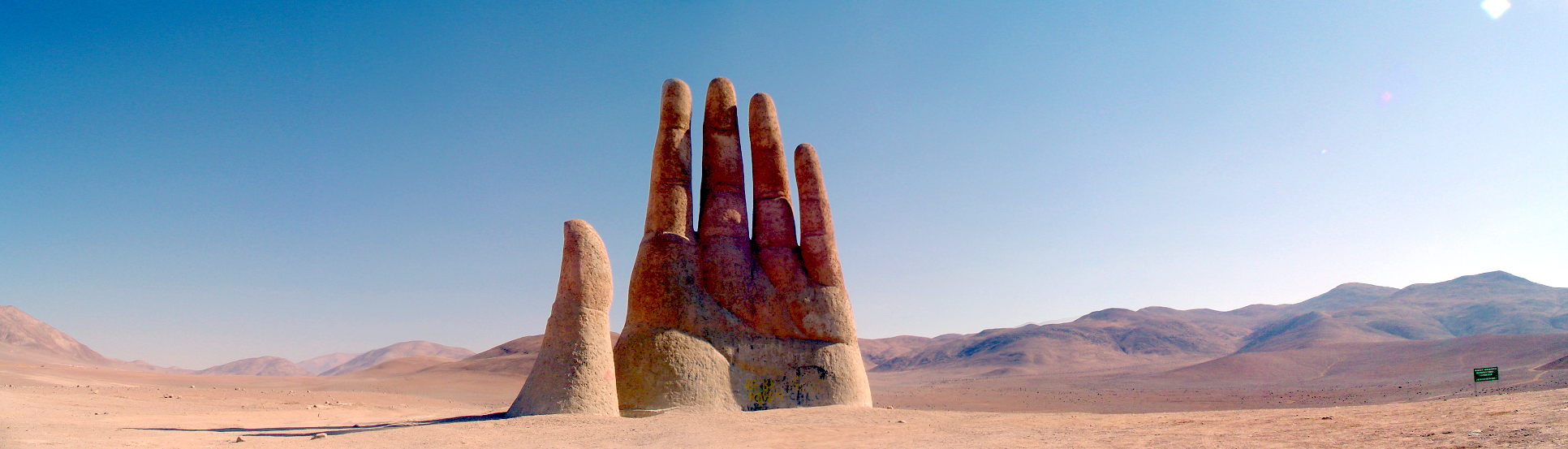
Panorama around Mano del Desierto

== See also ==
- Monumento al Ahogado ("The Hand"), another hand from the same artist, located on Parada 4 at Brava Beach in Punta del Este, a popular resort town in Uruguay.
