= Ron Haviv =

American photojournalist

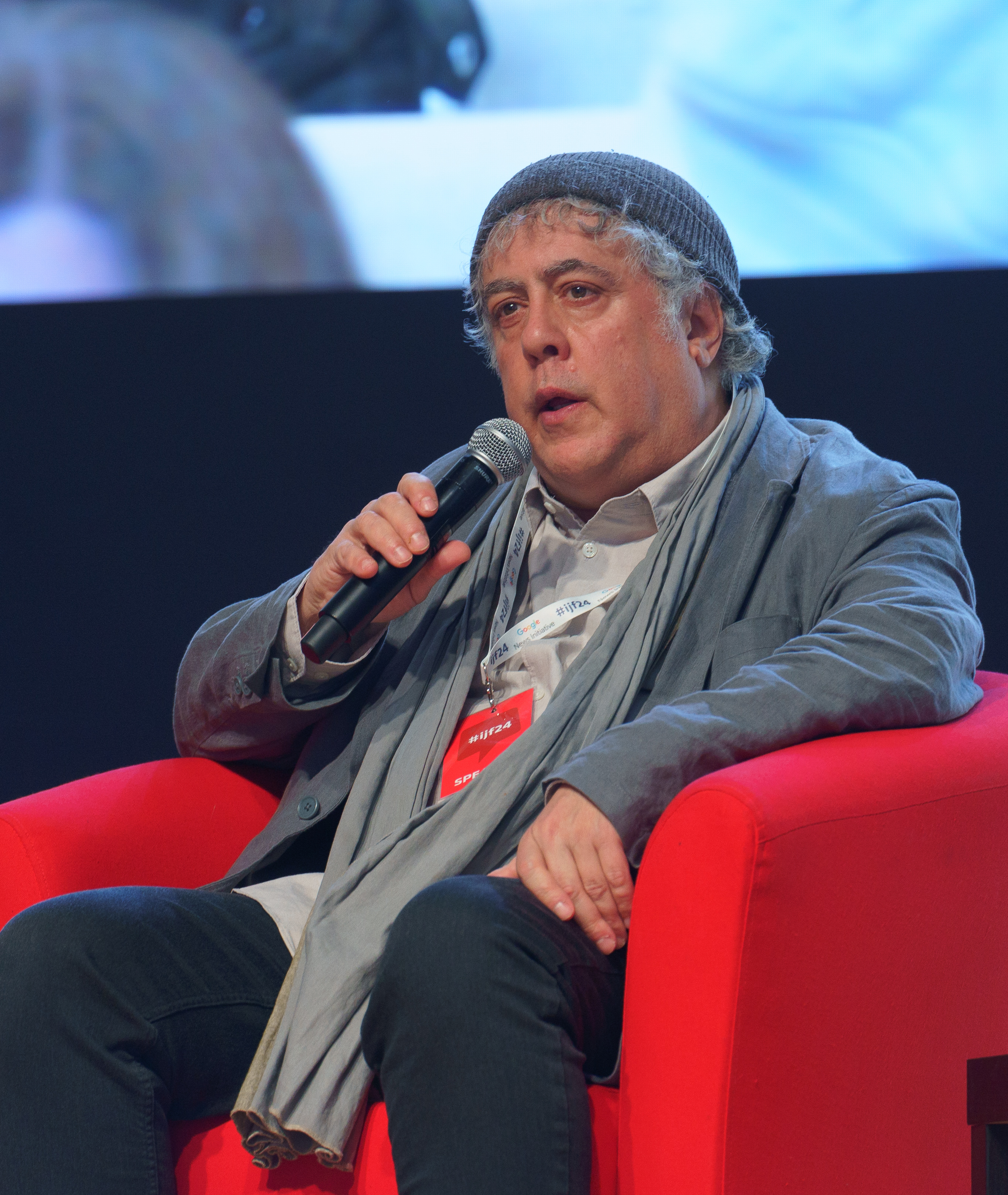
- Haviv in 2024
- Born: 1965 (age 60–61)
- Education: New York University
- Occupation: photojournalist
- Website: ronhaviv.com

Ron Haviv (born 1965) is an American photojournalist who covers conflicts. He is the author of several photographic publications, is a co-founder of VII Photo Agency, lectures at universities and conducts workshops. Haviv has photographed more than 26 conflicts and worked in over 100 countries in the last three decades. He has documented American politics since 1988 and has photographed over 10 national conventions.

== Biography ==
Ron Haviv was a student and graduate of Northern Valley Demarest High School in 1983, and later went on to graduate from New York University. Since the end of the Cold War he has covered conflict and other humanitarian crises worldwide.

Haviv has also photographed the city of Juárez, a battleground of the Mexican drug war where civilian, law enforcement and cartel member casualties occur daily. Additionally, Haviv covered the destruction of the 2010 Haiti earthquake, as well as the subsequent cholera epidemic, and celebrity support and involvement in its reconstruction. Haviv's photography also sheds light on malnutrition in Bangladesh, clashes between Los Angeles gangs and police forces, the 2009 Afghan presidential elections, the Sri Lankan Civil War, and the struggle for children in Darfur.

Haviv's photography has been collected and published in the books: Blood and Honey: A Balkan War Journal, Afghanistan: On the Road to Kabul, and Haiti: 12 January 2010. He is one of seven co-founders of VII Photo Agency, formed in 2001, along with Alexandra Boulat, Gary Knight, Antonin Kratochvil, Christopher Morris, James Nachtwey and John Stanmeyer. Haviv has channeled his focus on raising awareness for human rights violations by helping to create multi-platform projects for NGOs, such as Doctors Without Borders' DR Congo missions: The Forgotten War and Starved for Attention, UNICEF's Child Alert for Darfur and Sri Lanka, and the International Committee of the Red Cross' World at War.

In 2012 it was revealed an image from his book Afghanistan: On the Road to Kabul, which was also published on The Digital Journalist website, had been licensed to the arms manufacturer Lockheed Martin to advertise its small diameter bombs. According to figures in The Guardian in 2010 Lockheed Martin were the biggest seller of arms in the world, with sales exceeding $35 billion. Haviv responded to the controversy with a statement in which he textually says: "I draw a strict line between my photojournalism and commercial campaigns and feature examples of both on my website, where they are clearly labeled for what they are." Haviv also claimed that his photo agency "VII is not associated in any way with the images in question".

=== Yugoslav Wars ===
Željko Ražnatović ("Arkan") and his Tigers, photographed by Haviv in 1992.

Haviv is known for his broad documentation of the Yugoslav Wars: the battle of Vukovar in Croatia, the Siege of Sarajevo, the atrocities committed at Serb concentration camps in Bosnia and Herzegovina, and the practice of ethnic cleansing as exhibited by Arkan's Tigers, a Serb paramilitary group active during the Bosnian War.

In April 1992, Haviv embedded with Arkan's Tigers. His earlier interactions with the Tigers in Croatia included photographing their commander, Arkan, who expressed particular interest in an image of himself posing with a baby tiger and a gun. On April 2, 1992, while accompanying the Tigers to Bijeljina, Haviv documented their violent actions against civilians, and captured one of the first documented war crimes of the conflict. Among the photographs he took is one of Hajrush Ziberi, a young man pleading for his life, which served as evidence of the Tigers' detention of civilians. Ziberi's body was reportedly later discovered in the Sava River. Haviv witnessed the killings of several individuals, including a woman named Tifa, who was also shot while begging for her life. He observed that it was "clear Arkan's Tigers were rounding up and targeting civilians." His observations included a scene where a man, Admir Šabanović, was killed, noting that "they just shot him, like a joke."

As the Tigers prepared to leave the scene, Haviv realized the importance of capturing a photograph that included both the perpetrators and their victims. He recognized a commando he had previously photographed and took an image of him swinging his boot toward Tifa's body amidst the other victims. This photograph has become emblematic of the extraordinary violence against civilians, appearing in books, newspapers, and magazines, and cited by prosecutors at The Hague. After witnessing the events, Haviv quickly left the scene but was intercepted by Arkan, who confiscated the roll of film from Haviv's camera. Haviv had hidden additional rolls that contained some of the only existing photographs of the Bijeljina massacre. Two weeks later, Time published a photo essay titled "The Killing Goes On", which marked the first public exposure of the atrocities and prompted widespread international outcry. Following the publication, Arkan expressed his anger at Haviv, reportedly stating he "looked forward to the day" he could "drink his blood." Despite the notoriety of the photographs, many of the individuals depicted in them have yet to face legal consequences for their actions during the war.

== Publications ==
- Blood and Honey: A Balkan War Journal. TV Books, 2001. ISBN 978-1575001357.
- Afghanistan: On the Road to Kabul. New York: de.MO, 2002. ISBN 978-0970576859.
- Haiti: 12 January 2010. New York: de.MO, 2010. ISBN 978-0982590812. 16 posters folded and boxed.
- Lost Rolls. Blurb Publishing, 2015. ISBN 978-1320998840.

== Solo exhibitions ==
- Images of War, Perpignan, France (1995); Fotofusion, Palm Beach, FL (1996); The Newseum, New York, NY (1997); International Festival of Photojournalism, Gijon, Spain (1999); The Council on Foreign Relations, New York, NY (1999); Bayeux, France (2001)
- Afghanistan: The Road to Kabul, Grazia Neri, Milan, Italy (2002); 92nd Street Y, New York, NY (2002)
- Blood and Honey: A Balkan War Journal, Saba Gallery, New York, NY (2000); National Gallery, Sarajevo, Bosnia and Herzegovina (2000); Skopje Cultural Museum, Skopje, Macedonia (2001); Freedom Forum, London, England (2001); Rex Cultural House, Belgrade, Serbia (2002); Queen's Museum, Belfast, Northern Ireland (2005); Southeast Museum of Photography, Daytona Beach, FL (2005); War Photo Museum, Dubrovnik, Croatia (2003-2013)
- Children of Darfur, The United Nations, New York, NY (2005); University of California, Los Angeles, CA (2006); International Human Rights Film Festival, New Orleans, LA (2008); San Francisco Mission Cultural Center, San Francisco, CA (2008)
- Haiti: January 12, 2010, VII Gallery, New York, NY (2010); Fovea Gallery, New York, NY (2010)
