= Gary Knight (photographer) =

Anglo-American photographer, editor and author (born 1964)

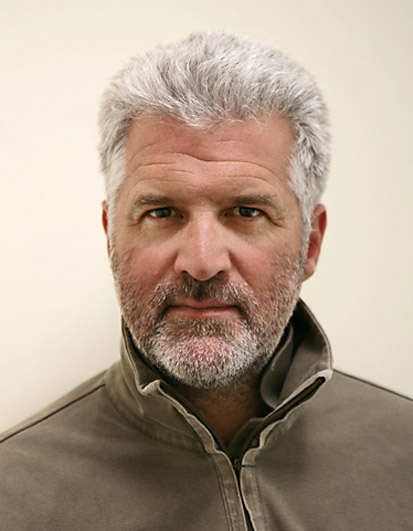
- Born: 1964 (age 61–62); Oakham, England
- Education: Arden School; Solihull Sixth Form College
- Known for: Photography

Gary Knight (born 1964) is an Anglo-American photographer, editor and author. Co-founder of the VII Photo Agency, co-founder and CEO of the VII Foundation and founder and CEO of the VII Academy.

== Life and work ==
Knight was born in 1964 in Oakham, England and was raised in the village of Knowle in the West Midlands. He attended Arden School and Solihull Sixth Form College. Knight left higher education midway through his first year and started to travel in Europe and the Middle East. He began working as a photographer in the late 1980s in South East Asia and Indochina from his home in Bangkok, Thailand.

In January 1993, Knight moved to the former Yugoslavia where he became involved in documenting war crimes and crimes against humanity during the civil war. During this period he covered conflicts in Africa, the Middle East and the Balkans and worked widely in Africa, Latin America, the Middle East, South Asia, South East Asia and the Far East (including North Korea) concentrating either on Human Rights and Poverty based issues or current affairs stories for US or European media. From 1999 to 2009 he was a contract photographer for Newsweek Magazine. In addition to Newsweek he has worked on assignment for Time, The Sunday Times, The New York Times, Paris Match, and Stern and his work has been published by magazines and newspapers worldwide. His work has also been exhibited worldwide and is in the collections of several museums and private collectors.

In 2000 with John Stanmeyer he conceived the VII Photo Agency which was launched in 2001. VII was named as the third most influential entity in photography by American Photo Magazine in 2003. In the same year he founded with Ron Haviv The VII Foundation. In 2005 Knight conceived the idea for the Angkor Photo Festival and Angkor Photo Workshops to support emerging photographers from Asia while he was teaching a workshop with James Nachtwey, Alexandra Boulat and Antonin Kratochvil in Siem Reap. In 2008 he founded with Simba Gill and Mort Rosenblum the print periodical Dispatches. In 2010 he founded and was the Director of the Program for Narrative & Documentary Practice at the Institute for Global Leadership at Tufts University until he resigned in 2018 to create and develop the VII Academy which he now runs. The VII Academy is a non-profit institution which provides tuition free education in media practice to the majority world and underrepresented communities in G20 countries from its campuses in Arles, France and Sarajevo, Bosnia. He is a Nieman Fellow at Harvard University, was an INSPIRE Scholar at Tufts University in 2010, and a Logan Non-Fiction Fellow at the Carey Institute in 2017.

Knight was chairman of World Press Photo contest in 2008 and 2014. He was vice president of the Pierre and Alexandra Boulat Foundation; was Chairman of the WHO/Stop TB Photography Advisory Board between 2009 and 2011, a board member of the Crimes of War Foundation and a trustee of the Indochina Media Memorial Foundation. He is a member of the board of the Frontline Club, London, is a co-founder and was a member of the board of the GroundTruth Foundation, a 501C3 registered in the US, (Resigned 2017).

Knight was naturalized as an American in July 2020 and is a dual citizen of Great Britain and the United States of America.

== The Stringer ==
Knight's involvement with the disputed authenticity of an iconic Vietnam War photo led to the documentary movie The Stringer. Asserting the photo, The Terror of War, was intentionally misattributed to AP photographer Nick Ut, to the detriment of the local freelance contributor, Knight claims, took the actual photo.

== Publications ==
=== Monographs by Knight ===
- Evidence - War Crimes in Kosovo. New York: de.MO, 2002.

=== Publications edited by Knight ===
- Dispatches. In America. Editor. Knight. Rosenblum. Contributors. Paul Theroux, Samantha Power, John Kifner, Gerald Scarfe, Muzamil Jaleel. (2008)
- Dispatches. Beyond Iraq. Editor, Knight, Rosenblum. Contributors, Yuri Kozyrev, Rod Nordland, Remy Ourdan, Keith Richburg, Jamie Tarabay, Jeff Danziger. (2008)
- Dispatches. On Russia. Editor. Knight, Rosenblum. Jeff Danziger, Seamus Murphy, Ilana Ozernoy, Louise Shelley, Alison Smale, Martin Cruz Smith, Andrei Soldatov. (2009)
- Dispatches. Out of Poverty. Editor, Knight, Rosenblum. Contributors. Jeff Danziger, Jon Lee Anderson, Shubhranshu Choudhary, Emma Daly, Jeffrey Fagan, Edward Girardet, Jerome Tubiana, Gary Knight (2009)
- Dispatches. Endgame. Editor, Knight, Rosenblum. Contributors. Philip Blenkinsop, Balazs Gardi, Tim Hirsch, Nancy Harmon Jenkins, Jane Kay, David Liittschwager, Andrew Marshall, Alan Weisman, Jeff Danziger (2009)
- Millennium Villages Project. De Mo. (2016)
- Imagine:Reflections on Peace. Hemeria. (2020)

=== Publications with contributions by Knight ===
- Sarajevo. Naythons, 1993.
- The Eye of War. Orion. 2003.
- War. New York: VII; de.MO, 2003.
- Rethink. New York: VII; de.MO, 2004.
- Congo, The Forgotten War. New York: VII; de.MO, 2005.
- Tsunami: A Document of Devastation. New York: VII; de.M), 2005. ISBN 978-0974283609.
- Dispatches. Out of Poverty. Editor, Knight, Rosenblum. Contributors. Jeff Danziger, Jon Lee Anderson, Shubhranshu Choudhary, Emma Daly, Jeffrey Fagan, Edward Girardet, Jerome Tubiana, Gary Knight (2009)
- Questions without Answers: The World in Pictures from the Photographers of VII. New York: VII; Phaidon, 2011. ISBN 978-0714848402.
- War | Photography. The Museum of Fine Arts. Houston. Texas (2013)
- Millennium Villages Project. De Mo. (2016)
- Imagine:Reflections on Peace. Hemeria. (2020)

== Awards ==
- 1996:The Amnesty International Photojournalism Award 1996/7 : Civil War In Zaire.
- 2000: 1st place Award for Features, 'Picture of the Year' Awards
- 2002: Amnesty International UK Media Award, photojournalism category, for his work on War crimes in Kosovo for Newsweek International.
- 2003: Honorable Mention Robert Capa Award: The War in Iraq.
- 2003: Fuji France Photographer of the Year 2003/4: The War in Iraq.
- 2005: Special Jury Prize (with three others), Days Japan International Photojournalism Awards.
- 2013 POYi Best Magazine Publication
