= Ed Kashi =

American photographer (born 1957)

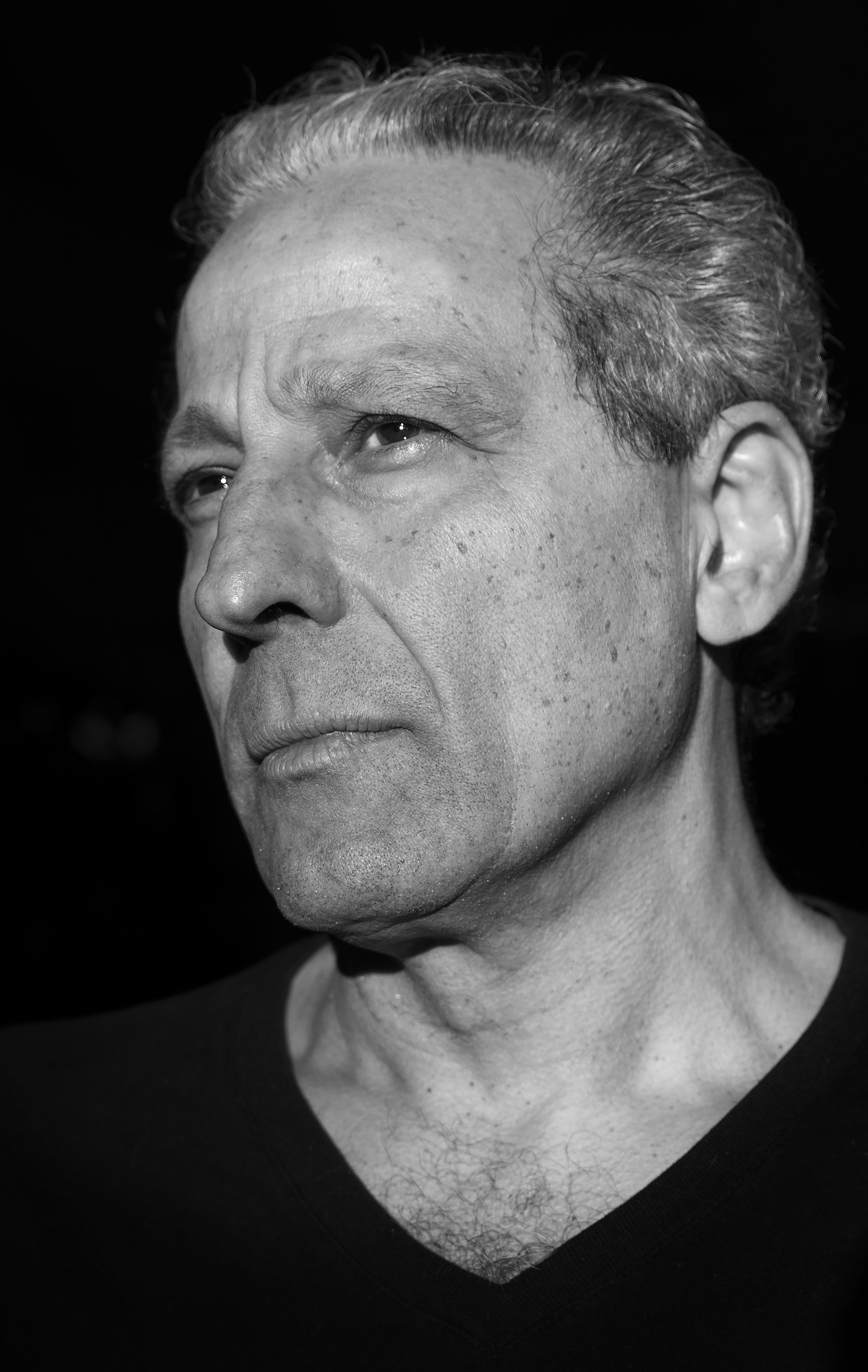
- Kashi at Anderson Ranch in 2019
- Born: 1957 (age 68–69); New York City
- Education: Syracuse University
- Occupation: photojournalist
- Website: www.edkashi.com

Ed Kashi (born 1957) is an American photojournalist and member of VII Photo Agency based in the Greater New York area. Kashi's work spans from print photojournalism, long term personal project, documentary films to experimental film. He is noted for documenting sociopolitical issues.

== Early life and education ==
Kashi was born in New York City in 1957. He graduated from Syracuse University's S.I. Newhouse School of Public Communications in 1979 with a major in photojournalism, and minors in English and Religion.

== Career ==
Kashi has worked with National Geographic Society and since 1990 has produced 17 major feature articles, and worked in over 100 countries. His clients include: The New York Times Magazine, Time, The New Yorker, Mediastorm, Ford Foundation, Robert Wood Johnson Foundation, GEO, Newsweek and msnbc.com.

Kashi has covered the plight of the Kurdish people and the impact of the oil industry upon the impoverished Niger Delta. He is known for his coverage of the Protestant community in Northern Ireland, the lives of Jewish settlers in the West Bank, and the strife between the Shiites and Sunnis in Iraq.

Kashi uses stills along with video and audio for storytelling purposes. His Iraqi Kurdistan flipbook premiered on msnbc.com in 2006. The flipbook utilizes thousands of stills in a moving image format, layered with music to create a symphonic documentary. The flipbook was included in Silverdocs film festival in 2007 and the Tiburon International Film Festival in 2008.

"Curse of the Black Gold, Hope and Betrayal in the Niger Delta", published in National Geographic in February 2007, chronicled the negative impact of oil development on the impoverished Niger Delta. This article led to a collaborative photographic and editorial essay book, Curse of the Black Gold: 50 Years of Oil in the Niger Delta (2008). Photojournalisms, a compilation of journal writings to his wife done over a nearly 20-year period, was published in March 2012 by JGS/Nazraeli Press.

In 2019, The Enigma Room an immersive installation, premiered at NYC's Photoville festival, and has since been seen in Israel, the Netherlands, South Korea, and New Mexico, U.S. The Enigma Room is an experimental multimedia projection created in collaboration with Brenda Bingham, Michael Curry, and Rachel Bolańos.

His book, Abandoned Moments: A Love Letter to Photography, was published by Kehrer in Germany, in 2021.

Kashi continues to teach and lecture at art institutes and universities. He taught a class titled "New Frontiers in the Art of Visual Storytelling" at the Los Angeles Center of Photography (LACP). He currently teaches a three-year mentoring program with James Estrin of the New York Times, at the Anderson Ranch Arts Center, as well as conducts workshops around the globe and mentors photographers through the VII Foundation's mentor program.

In 2023, along with Sara Terry and Ilvy Njiokiktjien, Kashi founded "1in6by2030", a global photography initiative documenting one of the defining demographic transformations of our time: by 2030, one in six people worldwide will be over the age of 60. Over the course of seven years, photographers across the globe will document the realities and impact of aging, and how individuals and societies navigate this unprecedented demographic shift through work, faith, family and health.

In 2025, the Dolph Briscoe Center for American History acquired Kashi's photography and video archive spanning the renowned photographer's career to date. The acquisition included his entire archive of prints, negatives, publications and personal journal entries. In conjunction with his collection, the Briscoe Center published a retrospective book, A Period in Time: Looking Back While Moving Forward, 1977-2022.

His limited-edition book, Visual Riffs, was also published in 2025 by Eyeshot. The book was a reimagining of over 45 years of work with images taken across 100 countries, covering social and geopolitical issues.

=== Talking Eyes Media ===
Kashi and his wife, Julie Winokur, are co-founders of a non-profit multimedia company called Talking Eyes Media. Talking Eyes Media was created in 2002 to deliver issue-orientated stories to the general public. Some of the stories covered by Talking Eyes Media/Ed Kashi are: Aging in America, Denied: The Crisis of America's Uninsured and The Sandwich Generation. Aging in America was also the subject of a book, named by American Photo Magazine as one of the best photo books of 2003 and received awards from Pictures of the Year International and World Press Photo.

== Personal life ==
He is married to Julie Winokur who is a writer and filmmaker and frequent collaborator.

== Publications ==
=== Publications by Kashi ===
- No Surrender: The Protestants. Self-published, 1991.
- When the Borders Bleed: The Struggle of the Kurds. Pantheon, 1994.
- Aging in America: The Years Ahead. Brooklyn: powerHouse, 2003.
- Denied: The Crisis of America's Uninsured. Talking Eyes, 2003.
- Curse of the Black Gold: 50 Years of Oil in the Niger Delta. Brooklyn: powerHouse, 2008.
- Three. Brooklyn: powerHouse, 2009.
- Madagascar: A Land Out of Balance. Prix Pictet, 2010.
- Photojournalisms. JGS: Witness #8. Portland, Oregon: Nazraeli, 2012.
- Abandoned Moments: A Love Letter to Photography. Germany Kehrer, 2021.
- The Cali Years. Self-published, 2021.
- Visual Riffs. Eyeshot, 2025.
- A Period in Time: Looking Back While Moving Forward, 1977-2022. University of Texas Press, 2025.

=== Publications with others ===
- Contatti. Provini d'Autore = Choosing the best photo by using the contact sheet. Vol. I. Edited by Giammaria De Gasperis. Rome: Postcart, 2012. ISBN 978-88-86795-87-6.
- Human Rights Watch: Struggling for a Humane World: Interviews / Ed Kashi: Sugar Cane | Syrian Refugees: Photographs. Göttingen: Steidl; Stuttgart: Institute for Foreign Cultural Relations, 2016. Edited by Ronald Grätz and Hans-Joachim Neubauer. ISBN 978-3-95829-167-6. An annual publication by the Institute for Foreign Cultural Relations (IFA), this year about Human Rights Watch (HRW). Kashi's photo-essays on Syrian Refugees and on chronic kidney disease among sugar cane workers in Central America illustrate the topic.
- Kurdistan: In the Shadow of History (second edition), edited by Susan Meiselas. University Chicago Press. 2008 ISBN 978-0226519289
- Visions of Paradise National Geographic. 2008.
- What Matters: The World's Preeminent Photojournalists and Thinkers Depict Essential Issues of Our Time, David Elliot Cohen. 2008.
- In Focus: National Geographic Greatest Portraits, National Geographic. 2010.
- Photo No-Nos: Meditations on What Not to Photograph. Edited by Jason Fulford. New York: Aperture. 2021. ISBN 9781597114998.

== Awards ==
- 2008: Special Jury Prize, Days Japan International Photojournalism Awards
- 2006: Special Jury Prize, Days Japan International Photojournalism Awards
- 2009: Shortlisted, Prix Pictet
- 2015: Pictures of the Year (POY): Multimedia Photographer of the Year 1st Place; Documentary Photojournalism 1st Place
- 2022: Px3 Book Photographer of the Year award for "Abandoned Moments"
