= Stefano De Luigi =

Italian photographer (born 1964)

- Stefano De Luigi takes part in a panel at the National Museum of Resistance and Human Rights in Esch-Uelzecht, Luxembourg, on October 22, 2026.
- Born: 4 February 1964 (age 62); Cologne, Germany
- Citizenship: Italian-French
- Website: stefanodeluigi.com

Stefano De Luigi (born 1964) is a German-born, Italian French photographer. He has been a member of VII Photo Agency since 2008 and lives in Paris.

Stefano De Luigi has won the World Press Photo contest four times in different categories (1998-2007-2010-2011). In 2009 he won the Moving Walls of Soros Foundation. In 2010 he won the Days Japan International Photojournalism Award and the Getty Grant for Editorial Photography. His book Blanco won the POYi Best Photography Book Award in 2011. In 2013, Stefano De Luigi won the Days Japan (Special Jury Prize) and Prix du Festival de St-Brieuc. In 2015 he was awarded the Syngenta Prize in London.

== Life and work ==
De Luigi was born in Cologne. He has been a professional photographer since 1988. He lived in Paris from 1989 to 1996, working for the Louvre Museum.

In 2000 he received the Honorable Mention of Leica Oskar Barnack Award. That same year he started a personal project titled Pornoland, a photographic journey on pornographic film sets, around the world. In 2004 Pornoland became a book with a text by Martin Amis, published in 5 countries by Thames and Hudson, Knessebeck La Martinière and Contrasto.

From 2003 to 2010, he worked on Blanco—a photographic project on the life condition of blind people, around the world. Blanco received the patronage of the World Health Organisation and won the W.E. Smith Fellowship Grant in 2007.

In 2006 Stefano De Luigi embarked on the project Cinema Mundi, a World Cinema exploration on the alternative cinematographic scene far away from Hollywood dream factory, including countries such as China, Russia, Iran, Argentina, Nigeria, South Korea and India. Cinema Mundi has also been transformed in a short 7-minute movie projected at the Locarno International Film Festival on August 4, 2007.

In 2010, Blanco was published by Trolley books and won the POYi Best Photography Book Award in 2011. In 2017 he published his third book iDyssey with French publisher Edition Bessard and in 2018 the book Babel was published by Postracrt in Italy.

His photographs have been published in magazines including Stern, Paris Match, Le Monde 2, Time, The New Yorker, Geo, Vanity Fair, El Pais and Sunday Time Magazine.

Stefano De Luigi has been a member of VII agency since 2008 and lives in Paris.

== Exhibitions ==
Pornoland has been exhibited at REA Gallery (Paris 2004), Santa Cecilia Gallery (Rome 2005), Lanificio (Naples 2006), Festival Transphotographiques (Lille 2007), and New York Photo Festival (NY 2011) and Photolux Festival (Lucca Italy) 2022. Personal exhibitions of De Luigi’s projects in these years include the WHO Head Quarter (Geneva 2010), VII Gallery (New York 2010), 10b Gallery (Rome 2010), Museum of Modern Art (Rovereto 2011), Photofestival (Athens 2012/15), Fondazione Stelline (Milan, 2013) Paris Mois de la Photo (2014) FotoIstanbul (2015) Venice Candiani Cultural Center(2017) Plenum Gallery Catania (2018) Museum of Palazzo Ducale (Genes 2019)Othersize Gallery (Milan 2020)Les Franciscaine (Deauville 2022) L Phololux (Luques 2023) Palazzo Ducale (Genes 2023) Musée des Art Appliqué (Belgrad 2023) Gallerie Cavour (Padoue 2024).

== Publications ==
- Pornoland. 2004. With a text by Martin Amis.
  - London: Thames & Hudson. ISBN 0500284989.
  - Germany: Knessebeck.
  - France: La Martiniere.
  - Italy: Contrasto.
- Blanco. London: Trolley, 2010. ISBN 978-1907112140.
- iDyssey. Paris: Bessard, 2017. ISBN 979-10-91406-43-7.
- Babel. With Michela Battaglia. Rome: Postcart, 2018. ISBN 978-8898391769.
- "Pornoland Redux" Selfpublished 2021
- "Il Bel Paese" l'Artiere 2022 ISBN 979-12-809780-59
- "Televisiva" L'Artiere 2024 ISBN 979-12-809783-94

== Awards ==
- 1998: World Press Photo arts and entertainments (3rd stories)
- 2005: Marco Bastianelli Prize, for Pornoland
- 2007: W. Eugene Smith Memorial Fund Grant
- 2007: World Press Photo, arts and entertainment (2nd single)
- 2009: Moving Walls. Liberia child soldiers.
- 2010: Getty Grant for Editorial Photography
- 2010: World Press Photo, Contemporary Issue (2nd Single)
- 2010: Days Japan International Photojournalism Awards (1st Prize)
- 2011: World Press Photo (2nd Multimedia)
- 2011: Pictures of the Year International Best Photography Book Award, for Blanco
- 2013: Special Jury Prize, Days Japan International Photojournalism Awards
- 2013: Prix du Festival de St-Brieuc, Saint Brieuc Photographie du Reportage
- 2015: Syngenta Prize (3rd single)
- 2021 Artistic residency "Planches Contact Festival" Deauville France
- 2022 Grant Strategie Fotografiche Italian Ministry of Culture

== General references ==
- MEP
- Vice
- Open society foundations
- France Culture
- PhotoDoc
