= Anush Babajanyan =

Armenian photojournalist

Anush Babajanyan is an Armenian photojournalist and a founder of the women's photography collective, 4Plus. She is best known for her documentation of lives in the conflict zones of the Caucasus.

== Biography ==
Anush Babajanyan studied at the Caucasus Media institute. In 2005, Babajanyan graduated from a programme of photography courses was offered by World Press Photo organised by Ruben Mangasaryan. She graduated with a degree in mass communications from the American University in Bulgaria in 2006.

== Career ==
After her graduation, Babajanyan worked as a contractor for the BBC Monitoring Service in Armenia, following which she became a freelance photojournalist.

From 2008, Babajanyan began to photograph women on the streets of Yerevan who distinguished themselves with their bright and unrestrained clothing. This developed as a project she called Inlandish, a neologism she used in opposition to the word outlandish, in which she explored how the women's inner lives manifested in their exterior world.

In 2009, Babajanyan began a project documenting the survivors of the Gyumri earthquake. Even twenty years after, nearly 4000 families were living in metal self-built shacks called domiks. These had no electricity or water supplies and were so ramshackle that another temblor would shatter them. Her pictures were exhibited in December 2009, in Yerevan.

Babajanyan co-founded the women's photography collective 4Plus in 2013. A joint exhibition, mOther Armenia, with ten photographers was one of the first projects of 4Plus. Inspired by and in opposition to the Mother Armenia statue in Yerevan's Victory Park that symbolised reverence for women, each of the ten collections exposed different issues faced by women in the country. Babajanyan also began a long-term project documenting the migration of Armenian women to Turkey for work.

In 2016, Babajanyan began a project to document the experiences of Syrian Armenians who fled the Syrian Civil War to Yerevan. While the Armenian government acted speedily to give citizenship to the refugees, their economic situation remained precarious, with both jobs and official housing in short supply. Babajanyan's photographs showed the domestic lives of the refugees. In particular, she showed the artefacts of significance that they brought with them to remember their previous lives. She, along with John Stanmeyer and Serra Akcan, started Bridging Stories, a photography training programme for Turks and Armenians to take and share pictures of their daily life on Instagram, in order to promote understanding between their peoples.

In 2017, Babajanyan travelled in Ivory Coast, where she documented the people's belief in the mystical powers of twins. Identically dressed siblings would mill about near mosques, and passers-by would give them money in return for a blessing. A photo series was exhibited in Abidjan. She also appeared in Levison Wood's television programme From Russia to Iran, where she guided him into Nagorno-Karabakh.
