= Stephanie Sinclair =

American photojournalist and nonprofit founder

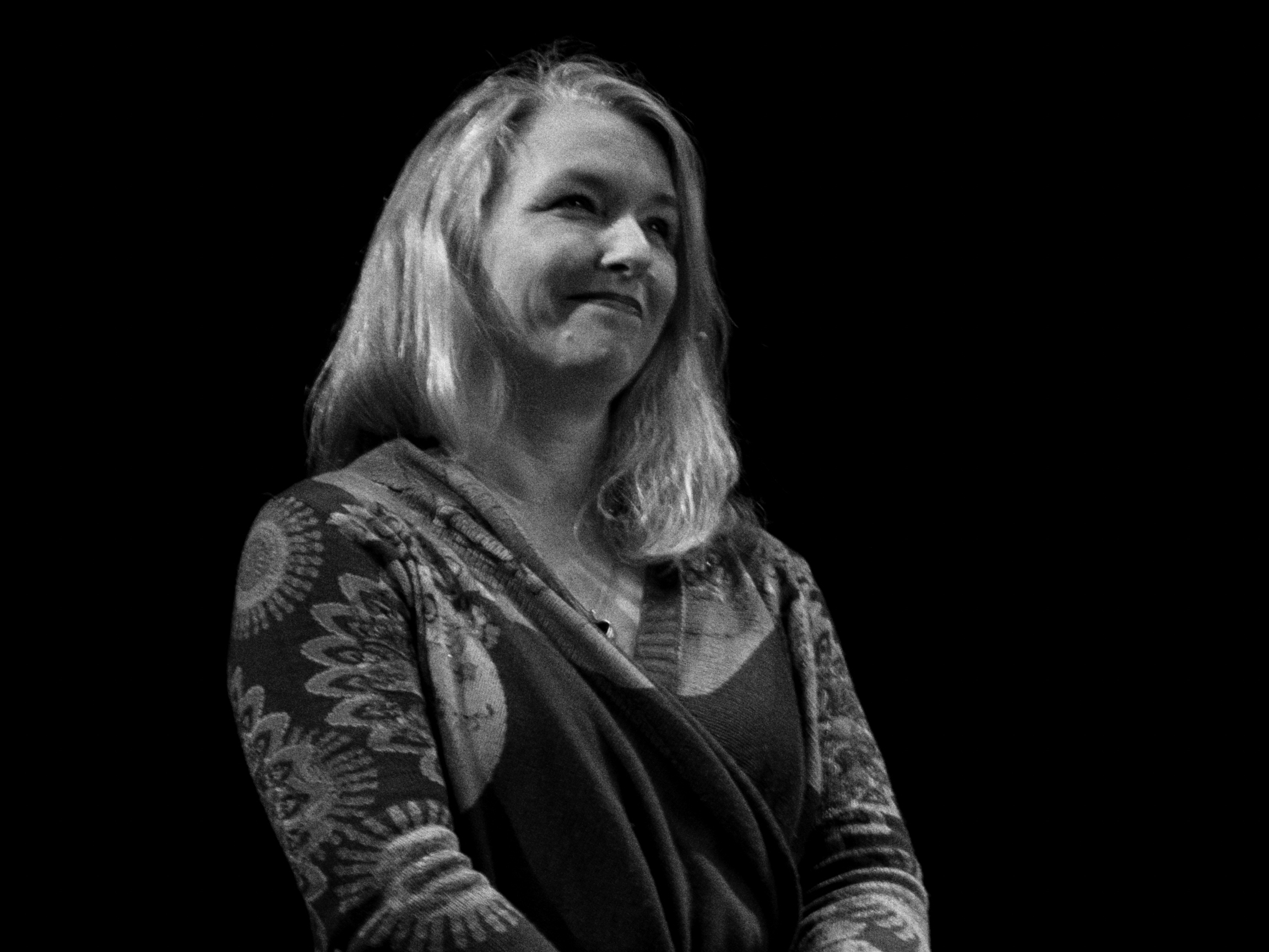
- Born: 1973 (age 52–53); Miami, Florida, United States
- Education: University of Florida, B.S. Journalism
- Occupations: Photojournalist, nonprofit executive
- Known for: Child marriage documentation; Too Young to Wed
- Website: stephaniesinclair.com

Stephanie Sinclair (born 1973) is an American photojournalist and nonprofit executive whose work focuses on gender and human rights issues including child marriage and self-immolation. She is the founder and CEO of Too Young to Wed, a nonprofit organization working to end child marriage globally. Her photography has been published in National Geographic, The New York Times, and Time, and has been used in U.S. government policy documents including the 2016 and 2024 editions of the United States Global Strategy to Empower Adolescent Girls. She is a former staff photographer at the Chicago Tribune and a former full member of the VII Photo Agency.

== Early life and education ==
Sinclair was born in 1973 in Miami, Florida. Her mother was a painter and graphic designer whose vibrant use of color and visual storytelling Sinclair has cited as an early influence on her own photographic style and her commitment to women's rights. She graduated from the University of Florida with a Bachelor of Science in Journalism in 1998, with an outside concentration in fine art photography. In 2008 she was named by the University of Florida College of Journalism and Communications as one of its Alumni of Distinction, and was subsequently inducted into the UF CJC Hall of Fame.

== Career ==
=== Chicago Tribune ===
Sinclair joined the Chicago Tribune as a staff photographer in 1998. She served as a lead photographer on the paper's Pulitzer Prize-winning four-part series "Gateway to Gridlock," which examined systemic failures in the U.S. air travel system and won the 2001 Pulitzer Prize for Explanatory Reporting.

She also served as lead photographer on the Tribune's five-part investigative series "The Failure of the Death Penalty in Illinois." Following publication, Governor George Ryan placed a moratorium on the death penalty in 2000 after 13 Death Row inmates were exonerated. Sinclair received the Chicago Bar Association's Herman Kogan Meritorious Achievement Award in 2000 in recognition of her visual storytelling in the series.

Sinclair covered the beginning of the Iraq War for the Tribune before leaving to work as a freelance photographer based in Iraq and then Beirut, Lebanon, covering the Middle East and South Asia for six years. In 2005, her work was featured on The NewsHour with Jim Lehrer in a segment called "Picturing Iraq."

=== VII Photo ===
Sinclair joined the VII Network upon its establishment in 2008 and became a full member of VII in 2009, remaining with the agency until 2017. She was also selected to participate in the 2006 Joop Swart Masterclass, an intensive seminar for emerging documentary photographers organized by World Press Photo.

In 2010, Sinclair participated in "Starved for Attention," a collaborative project between Doctors Without Borders and VII Photo documenting childhood malnutrition globally. The multimedia campaign received an Emmy nomination.

=== Documentary work ===
Sinclair first encountered child marriage in 2003 while working on a project about self-immolation in Afghanistan, where she found that most victims had been married between the ages of 9 and 13. Her photographs from this project were exhibited at the Whitney Museum of American Art's 2010 Biennial under the title "Self-Immolation in Afghanistan: A Cry for Help." The widespread media attention the images received contributed to the establishment of a new burn unit at the public hospital in Herat.

In 2006, National Geographic named Sinclair an Adventurer of the Year, citing her documentation of child marriage in Afghanistan's Ghor Province, where she spent weeks living with families in remote villages to gain access to a closed society and capture the first photographs of Afghan girls being sold as brides.

Her photo series Too Young to Wed documents child marriage across 15 countries and over two decades of fieldwork including Afghanistan, Nepal, Ethiopia, India, Nigeria, Guatemala, and Yemen, among others. During fieldwork in Yemen in 2010, Sinclair's presence prompted a local campaign involving community health workers to discuss the medical risks of early marriage, resulting in the community agreeing to stop a planned wedding. A photograph from the series depicting two Yemeni child brides was selected by National Geographic as one of its best 15 photographs of the decade in 2019 and as one of the publication's most compelling images of the 21st century.

In 2016, the BBC credited Sinclair for documenting efforts of African leaders campaigning for the rights of girls at risk of child marriage, including Thobeka Madiba Zuma, First Lady of South Africa, and Esther Lungu, First Lady of Zambia.

In 2017, Sinclair documented the vulnerability of people with albinism to violence and social discrimination in Tanzania for National Geographic, published in the June 2017 issue.

In 2022, Sinclair and writer Jaime Lowe spent two weeks documenting the impact of the Supreme Court's decision in Dobbs v. Jackson Women's Health Organization on high-risk pregnancies inside the Cleveland Clinic's maternal-fetal medicine department. The resulting piece, "What a High-Risk Pregnancy Looks Like After Dobbs," was published in The New York Times Magazine in November 2022 and was also exhibited at the 2023 Visa pour l'Image festival in Perpignan, France.

Sinclair has been a contributing photographer to National Geographic since 2006 and to The New York Times since 2004. She is represented by the National Geographic Image Collection and Speakers Bureau and has been a Canon Explorers of Light member since 2016.

In 2016, Sinclair sued Mashable and its parent company Ziff Davis after the publication embedded her photograph "Child, Bride, Mother/Child Marriage in Guatemala" from her Instagram account without her consent, offering her $50 to license it before publishing without agreement. The Southern District Court of New York initially ruled that Mashable had sublicensed the photograph through Instagram's terms of service, but the case was subsequently reopened. Mashable reached a settlement with Sinclair in 2021, represented by her attorneys James H. Bartolomei and Bryan D. Hoben, who is also her husband. "Because of this case, third party publishers generally no longer embed copyrighted photos or videos from Instagram without first obtaining permission or a license from the copyright holder," said Bartolomei.

=== Films ===
Sinclair has produced and directed several documentary short films. Three were published in The New York Times Sunday Review as part of the "Child, Bride, Mother" series:

Too Young to Wed: Destaye (2012), produced as part of a UNFPA campaign to end child marriage, selected as a Staff Pick by Vimeo Child, Bride, Mother: Guatemala (2014), supported by the UNFPA Child, Bride, Mother: Nepal (2016), supported by the American Jewish World Service; Official Selection of the Through Women's Eyes Film Festival 2017 Child, Bride, Mother: Nigeria (2017), supported by the Ford Foundation; Official Selection of the Paris Lift-Off Film Festival 2017, the Femme Frontera Filmmaker Showcase 2017, and the Peace on Earth Film Festival 2018

== Too Young to Wed ==
Sinclair founded Too Young to Wed (TYTW) as a nonprofit organization in 2014, building on her decade of documentary work on child marriage.

In 2012, prior to the organization's formal founding, Sinclair launched a multimedia exhibition at the United Nations on the first International Day of the Girl Child, attended by Archbishop Desmond Tutu and Secretary General Ban Ki-Moon. The exhibition subsequently traveled to more than 25 countries worldwide in partnership with UNFPA and the Canadian Government.

Sinclair partnered with UNFPA on its report Marrying Too Young, which contributed to 193 countries committing to end child marriage by 2030 through the adoption of Target 5.3 of the UN Sustainable Development Goals, which calls for the elimination of child, early, and forced marriage and female genital mutilation.

A Too Young to Wed photography exhibition at the Russell Senate Office Building in Washington D.C. in 2013 contributed to advocacy efforts that influenced the Violence Against Women Reauthorization Act, which for the first time addressed child marriage and mandated that the U.S. State Department develop a comprehensive strategy to end child marriage.

In 2014, a collection of Sinclair's body of work was displayed in a show at the Bronx Documentary Center in the South Bronx. The same year, Sinclair and Jessica Dimmock were awarded the 2014 Infinity Award: Photojournalism by the International Center of Photography.

In 2017, Sinclair's body of work on child marriage was displayed in the inaugural exhibition of L'Arche du Photojournalisme at the Grande Arche de la Défense in Paris, organized by Visa pour l'Image director Jean-François Leroy. The exhibition featured 175 photographs, six short films, and educational materials documenting child marriage across ten countries over fifteen years, with 65 percent of images never previously exhibited. French Minister of Culture Françoise Nyssen attended the opening.

In 2021, following the Taliban takeover of Afghanistan, Sinclair led TYTW's Afghanistan Emergency Initiative, which was involved in efforts to assist Afghan nonprofit workers, women, and families during evacuation efforts.

On the Tenth Annual International Day of the Girl Child in October 2022, TYTW debuted a multimedia exhibition titled Girls on the Brink: Holding on to Fragile Futures, at which U.S. Deputy Secretary of State Wendy R. Sherman delivered the keynote address.

A CNN report in which TYTW was featured received the News & Documentary Emmy Award for Outstanding Hard News Feature Story: Short Form, chronicling the story of a nine-year-old TYTW beneficiary in Afghanistan.

In 2024, the United States Global Strategy to Empower Adolescent Girls was updated to once again feature TYTW imagery on its cover and throughout the strategy.

== Personal life ==
In 2015, Sinclair collaborated with ProPublica on an investigation into U.S. hospital accountability and patient safety, sharing her family's experience following the death of her mother, Paula Schulte, after a series of medical errors at Florida hospitals in 2012. The piece, co-published with The Daily Beast, examined systemic failures in hospital disclosure and patient protection. Sinclair has described her willingness to share her family's experience as consistent with her broader belief in journalism as a tool for accountability and systemic change.

In 2017, Sinclair and her husband, Bryan D. Hoben, adopted two children with albinism from China. Time magazine documented the adoption process and the family's experience navigating albinism and identity. National Geographic also published a personal essay by Sinclair about her children and her photography documenting albinism.

== Awards ==
Year	Award	Organization
2024	Founder's Award	National Press Photographers Association
2024	International Understanding Through Photography Award	Photographic Society of America
2023	Professional Photographer Achievement Award	International Photographic Council
2023	Espíritu Award ($100,000)	Isabel Allende Foundation
2022	Distinguished Partners for Women, Peace and Security Award	Strategy for Humanity
2020	Flash Grant "Social Change Agent" Award	Shuttleworth Foundation
2019	Dr. Erich Salomon Award	Deutsche Gesellschaft für Photographie
2018	"50 Badass Women Who Are Changing the World"	InStyle Magazine
2018	Anja Niedringhaus Courage in Photojournalism Award	International Women's Media Foundation
2016	Explorers of Light member	Canon USA
2015	Art for Peace Award	Veronesi Foundation
2015	Lucie Humanitarian Award	Lucie Foundation
2014	Infinity Award: Photojournalism	International Center of Photography
2013	First Place Multimedia Story, Too Young to Wed: Destaye	World Press Photo
2012	First Place Contemporary Issues Story, Too Young to Wed	World Press Photo
2012	Visa d'Or Features Award	Visa pour l'Image
2010	Visa d'Or Features Award	Visa pour l'Image
2010	Community Awareness Award	Pictures of the Year International
2009	Olivier Rebbot Award	Overseas Press Club
2008	Alumni of Distinction	University of Florida College of Journalism and Communications
2008	Award for Humanitarian Reportage	CARE International
2008	Professional Grant	Alexia Foundation
2007	Photo of the Year	UNICEF
2007	Third Place People in the News	World Press Photo
2006	Adventurer of the Year	National Geographic
2006	Joop Swart Masterclass participant	World Press Photo
2004	Visa d'Or Features Award	Visa pour l'Image
2004	Central Asia and Caucasus Grant	Fifty Crows International Fund for Documentary Photography
2003	First Place Contemporary Issues Single	World Press Photo
2001	First Place Features Picture Story	Pictures of the Year International
2000	Herman Kogan Meritorious Achievement Award	Chicago Bar Association

== Selected publications ==
Sinclair's photography has been included in the following books:

- Women of Vision: National Geographic Photographers on Assignment (2014), with Sinclair's photograph of child bride Nujood Ali on the cover. The book inspired a traveling exhibition that visited six cities across the United States.
- QUESTIONS WITHOUT ANSWERS: The World in Pictures by the Photographers of VII (2012)
- The New York Times Magazine: Photographs (2011)
- What Matters: The World's Preeminent Photojournalists and Thinkers Depict Essential Issues of Our Time (2008), which included a section on Sinclair's child marriage photography described by Publishers Weekly as "disquiet with their beauty and horror"
- A Day in the Life of the American Woman: How We See Ourselves (2005), featuring Sinclair's images of American women working and serving in Iraq

== Selected exhibitions ==
- 2023 — Visa pour l'Image, Perpignan, France — "What a High-Risk Pregnancy Looks Like After Dobbs"
- 2019 — Times Square Electronic Billboard, "Colorfull" (International Albinism Awareness Day, June 13, 2019)
- 2017 — L'Arche du Photojournalisme, Grande Arche de la Défense, Paris (inaugural exhibition) — "Too Young to Wed"
- 2014 — Bronx Documentary Center, New York — "Too Young to Wed"
- 2013 — Oslo Freedom Forum — child marriage documentation
- 2012–2015 — United Nations Headquarters, New York — "Too Young to Wed" (traveled to more than 25 countries)
- 2012 — Times Square Electronic Billboard, "Too Young to Wed" (October 11 – November 11, 2012)
- 2012 — Visa pour l'Image, Perpignan, France — "Child Brides"
- 2010 — Whitney Museum of American Art, 2010 Biennial, New York — "Self-Immolation in Afghanistan: A Cry for Help"
- 2010 — Milano Triennial, Milan, Italy — "Disquieting Images"
- 2010 — Visa pour l'Image, Perpignan, France — "Polygamy in America"
- 2009 — Museum of Army (The Invalides), Paris — "L'Afghanistan et Nous 2001–2009"
- 2008 — Rayburn House Office Building, Washington D.C. — "The Bride Price: The Consequences of Early Marriage Worldwide"
- 2008 — Brighton Photo Biennial, Brighton, England — "Memory of Fire: The War of Images and Images of War"
- 2006 — Museum of Photographic Arts, San Diego — "Breaking the Frame: Pioneering Women Photojournalists"
- 2005 — Peace Museum, Chicago (solo exhibition) — "Occupation: Iraq"
- 2004 — Visa pour l'Image, Perpignan, France — "Self-Immolation in Afghanistan"
