= Marcus Bleasdale =

British photojournalist

Marcus Terence Luke Bleasdale CMG (born 1968) is a British photojournalist. His books include One Hundred Years of Darkness (2003), The Rape of a Nation (2009) and The Unravelling (2015). Bleasdale was appointed Companion of the Order of St Michael and St George (CMG) in the 2023 Birthday Honours for services to international photojournalism and human rights.

== Life and career ==
Bleasdale has covered the conflict within the Democratic Republic of Congo since 1998, which was published in his first book One Hundred Years of Darkness. His second book, The Rape of a Nation, addressed the issues of the conflict being fuelled by natural resource exploration and was awarded the Best Photography Book Award in 2009 by Pictures of the Year International in the USA.

His work on human rights and conflict has been exhibited at the United States Senate, US House of Representatives, The United Nations and the Houses of Parliament in the UK and the International Criminal Court in The Hauge.

He works regularly with Human Rights Watch, UNICEF, Médecins Sans Frontières Saint Kizito Orphanage and other NGOs to highlight health and human rights issues in several countries. He works to cover issues underreported by mainstream media. In 2007, Human Rights Watch and the Open Society Institute awarded Bleasdale a grant to continue his work on justice and accountability in the DRC. He is an Enough Project Fellow.

Bleasdale was a member of the VII Photo Agency until 2015 and a member of its board. He has been one of the journalists covering the conflict in Central African Republic between 2013 and 2017, documenting the violence for Human Rights Watch alongside their Director of Emergencies, Peter Bouckaert. This has been covered by many publications and news channels, including National Geographic.

He has had his work published in the UK, Europe and the US in Sunday Times Magazine, The Telegraph Magazine, GEO, The New Yorker, Time, Newsweek, National Geographic, Stern, Le Monde, The New York Times, Rolling Stone, Mother Jones (Masthead Photographer), Aftenposten and Die Zeit.

Bleasdale graduated with an MSt in International Relations from Cambridge University and is still documenting human rights issues around the world and working as managing director of Wilstar, a Social Impact Not for Profit based in Oslo, Norway.

== Personal life ==
He lives in Oslo with his wife, Karin Beate, and daughters.

== Publications ==
- One Hundred Years of Darkness. London: Pirogue, 2003. ISBN 0-9543015-0-1.
- The Rape of a Nation. London: Mets and Schilt, 2009. ISBN 978-90-5330-671-0.
- The Unravelling. New York: FotoEvidence, 2015. ISBN 978-0996391207.

== Films ==
- The Secret Life of Walter Mitty (2013) starring Ben Stiller. Included photographs by Bleasdale and members of VII Photo Agency.
- A Thousand Times Goodnight (2013) starring Juliet Binoche. Bleasdale was an advisor and had photographs included.

== Awards ==
- 2004: UNICEF Photographer of the Year
- 2005: Readers Award (with two others), Days Japan International Photojournalism Awards.
- 2005: The Olivier Rebbot Award for Best Foreign Reporting
- 2005: The Open Society Institute (OSI) Distribution Grant
- 2005: Pictures of the Year International (POYi) Magazine Photographer of the Year Award
- 2005: The Alexia Foundation for World Peace
- 2005: The World Press Photo of the Year
- 2007: Human Rights Watch and the Open Society Institute awarded him a grant to continue his work on justice and accountability in the Democratic Republic of the Congo
- 2007: The Freedom of Expression Foundation Norway
- 2009: Public Prize (Reader's Award) (along with four others), Days Japan International Photojournalism Awards.
- 2009: Magazine News Award in POYi
- 2010: Anthropographia Award for Photography and Human Rights
- 2010: The Hansel Mieth Award
- 2010: Best Photography Book Award from POYi
- 2011: The Freedom of Expression Norway
- 2011: Webby Award for the feature Dear Obama
- 2012: Royal Photographic Society Hood Medal for meritorious performance in photography, with particular emphasis on photography for public service.
- 2012: Nominated for a News and Documentary Emmy Award with other members of VII Photo Agency for the film Starved For Attention, made for Médecins Sans Frontières.
- 2013: Overseas Press Club of America Awards, Feature Photography Award for Last of the Vikings
- 2014: World Press Photo, 3rd Prize Contemporary Issues for Last of the Vikings
- 2014: Robert Capa Gold Medal from the Overseas Press Club.
- 2015: FotoEvidence Book Award for Inferno:Central African Republic.
- 2015: W. Eugene Smith Fellowship from the W. Eugene Smith Memorial Fund.
- 2023: Companion of the Order of St Michael and St George (CMG) in the 2023 Birthday Honours for services to international photojournalism and human rights.

== Exhibitions ==
- Chicago Public Library (2006)
- United States Senate (2009)
- Headquarters of the United Nations, New York (2009)
- Columbia College (2009)
- The Houses of Parliament, UK (2010)
- Pulitzer Center on Crisis Reporting (2012)
- The White House (2012)
- Fotografiska Farming Out of Poverty (2013)
- Christie's London (2015) IMPACT for Human Rights Watch.
- The International Criminal Court, The Hauge (2018)
- The United Nations Headquarters, New York (2018)
- Venice Biennale (2019)
