= Tomas van Houtryve =

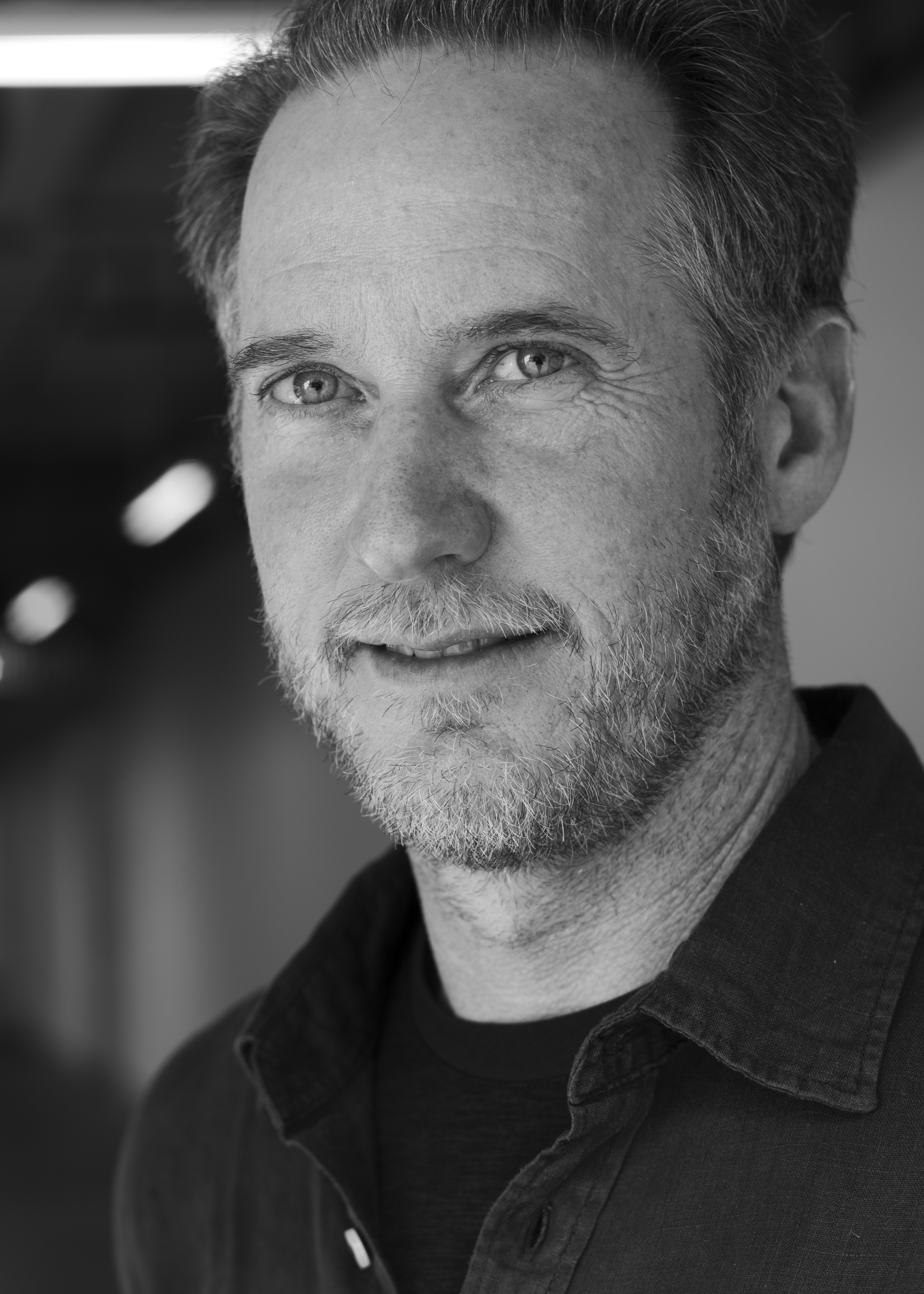
- van Houtyve in 2022
- Education: Columbia University
- Known for: conceptual documentary photography, video installations
- Notable work: 36 Views of Notre Dame, Lines and Lineage, Blue Sky Days, Traces of Exile
- Movement: Contemporary art
- Awards: International Center for Photography Infinity Award, CatchLight Pulitzer Center Fellowship, World Press Photo Award, Bayeux-Calvados Award for war correspondents, Roger Pic Award, POY Photographer of the Year, Magnum Foundation Grant, Aaron Siskind Fellowship
- Website: https://tomasvh.com

Tomas van Houtryve is a Belgian visual artist, director and cinematographer working mainly with photography and video. He is known for using a wide range of contemporary and early image-making techniques. Van Houtryve is a Fellow at Columbia University's Institute for Ideas and Imagination in Paris, an emeritus member of the VII Photo Agency, a National Geographic Explorer since 2024, and a Contributing Artist for Harper's Magazine.

== Life and career ==
Van Houtryve attended a university in Nepal, studying philosophy. He became internationally known for his photographs of the Maoist rebellion in Nepal, winning the Visa pour l'Image Ville de Perpignan award in 2006 and the Bayeux Calvados-Normandy Award for war correspondents in 2006.

Van Houtryve next embarked on a seven-year photographic project to document life in the last countries where the Communist Party still remained in power: North Korea, Cuba, China, Nepal, Vietnam, and Laos. In 2010 he was named Photographer of the Year in the Pictures of the Year International Competition. A monograph of the work titled Behind the Curtains of 21st Century Communism was published in 2012.

Van Houtryve then turned his interest to the US military's use of surveillance drones with a series titled Blue Sky Days. Supported by a Getty Editorial Grant of $10,000, he used his own modified drone in the US to explore the implications of surveillance techniques used by the US both outside and within its borders. For this work, van Houtryve was awarded the 2015 International Center of Photography Infinity Award and a second prize World Press Photo award.

In 2016 van Houtryve received a grant from the Pulitzer Center to create a video installation about the European refugee crisis. The work was exhibited at Chicago's Museum of Contemporary Photography the Southeastern Center for Contemporary Art and C/O Berlin. Extracts from the project were published in a 2021 book by Steidl and by The New Yorker. In 2017, the video installation was acquired for the permanent collection of the International Center for Photography with funds provided by Marjorie and Jeffrey Rosen.

Van Houtryve was selected for the inaugural CatchLight Fellowship in 2017 and granted $30,000 for a project titled Lines and Lineage. The work explores America's collective amnesia of history, addressing the missing photographic record of the period when Mexico ruled what we now know as the American West. Van Houtryve photographed the region with glass plates and a 19th-century wooden camera. He paired portraits of direct descendants of early inhabitants of the West—mestizo, Afro-Latin, indigenous, Crypto-Jewish—with photographs of landscapes along the original border and architecture from the Mexican period. The work earned van Houtryve France's 2019 Roger Pic Award. A monograph of the work was published in 2019 by Radius Books. The book was adapted into a one-hour documentary by French television, co-directed by van Houtryve and Mathilde Damoisel. The film was first broadcast in France in 2022. It premiered in the United States with a screening at the Taos Center for the Arts under the title Far West – The Hidden History in 2022. Van Houtryve's mesmerizing aerial footage of the Mexico–United States border was also used for the opening scene of the 2024 Errol Morris film Separated, which was premiered at the 81st Venice International Film Festival.

Following the 2019 fire at Notre-Dame de Paris, van Houtryve was selected to photograph and film the damage and reconstruction of the iconic cathedral. His photo of Notre Dame was chosen for the cover of National Geographic Magazine in February, 2022. A major solo exhibition of his photographs, featuring monumental prints, was exhibited on the public square in front of Notre Dame from March 2023 to May 2024. His images of the cathedral were next exhibited at the Rencontres d'Arles festival in the south of France. A monograph of his work, titled 36 Views of Notre Dame, was published in the fall of 2024 by Radius Books.

== Public collections ==
Van Houtryve's work is held in the following public collections:

- Museum of Contemporary Photography, Chicago
- Museum of Fine Arts, Houston
- International Center of Photography Museum, New York
- The Nelson-Atkins Museum of Art, Kansas City
- Espace Henri Matisse, Creil France

== Books ==
- Behind the Curtains of 21st Century Communism. Photographs of Nepal, North Korea, Cuba, Moldova, Laos, Vietnam, and China, Éditions Intervalles, Paris 2012. ISBN 978-2-916355-65-8. Preface by Tzvetan Todorov.
  - La Lutte continue: voyage dans les communismes du XXIe siècle. Paris: Éditions Intervalles, 2012. ISBN 978-2-916355-64-1. French-language version.
  - Geschlossene Gesellschaften: eine fotografische Reise durch kommunistische Länder. Bern: Benteli, 2012. ISBN 978-3-7165-1714-7. German-language version.
- Lines and Lineage. Radius Books, 2019. ISBN 978-1-942185-62-8
- 36 Views of Notre Dame. Radius Books, 2024. ISBN 9798890180872

== Awards ==
- 2006: Ville de Perpignan Rémi Ochlik award, Visa pour l'image, Perpignan, for photographs of the Maoist rebellion in Nepal.
- 2007: Bayeux-Calvados Award for war correspondents, for photographs of the Maoist rebellion in Nepal.
- 2010: Third place, "Issue Reporting Picture Story - Freelance/Agency", Pictures of the Year International, for the series Moldova: The Outsiders.
- 2010: First place, "Photographer of the Year - Freelance/Agency", Pictures of the Year International.
- 2015: 2nd prize in the Contemporary Issues Stories category, World Press Photo.
- 2015: International Center of Photography Infinity Award for the series Blue Sky Days.
- 2017: Hasselblad Foundation Research and Development Award
- 2018: CENTER's Producer's Choice Award, 1st Place
- 2019: Leica Oskar Barnack Prize, Finalist
- 2019: Roger Pic Award for the series Lines and Lineage.
- 2023: Étoile de la Société civile des auteurs multimédia for the film Far West – The Hidden History.

== Solo exhibitions ==
- Chute d'un dieu souverain, 18e Festival international de photojournalisme, Visa pour l'image, Perpignan, France, 2006.
- Rébellion au Népal, Les rencontres prix Bayeux–Calvados des correspondents de guerre, Galerie le Radar, Bayeux, 2007
- The fall of a god king, Artè Foto Festival, Villa Salvati, Ancona, 2008
- Népal: rituels et révolution, Galerie in my room, Paris, 2009
- Nepal: A 'people's war' topples the god king, Moving Walls 16. Open Society Foundations, New York, London, and Washington DC, 2010
- Behind the curtains, Visa pour l'image, Perpignan, France, 2010
- Behind the curtains, Third Floor Gallery, Cardiff, Britain, 2011–12
- Off the radar, Festival-Photoreporter, Baie de Saint-Brieuc, Côtes-d'Armor, France, 2012
- Blue Sky Days, Anastasia Photo gallery, New York City 2016
- Blue Sky Days, Galerija Vartai, Vilnius, Lithuania, 2017
- Lines and Lineage, galerie Baudoin Lebon, Paris, 2019
- Lines and Lineage, Espace Matisse, Creil, France, 2021
- Ceci Tuera Cela, La Chapelle de Clairefontaine, France, 2023
- Notre-Dame: la renaissance d'une icône, Paris, 2023-24

== Group exhibitions ==
- North Korean Perspectives, MoCP, Chicago, USA, 2015
- North Korean Perspectives, Drents Museum, Assen, the Netherlands, 2015
- Bending the Frame, Fotografisk Center, Copenhagen, Denmark, 2016
- To See Without Being Seen, Kemper Museum, Saint Louis, USA, 2016
- Surveillance, The Nelson-Atkins Museum of Art, Kansas City, USA, 2016
- Watching You, Watching Me, Museum of Photography, Berlin, Germany, 2017
- Perpetual Revolution: the Image and Social Change, ICP Museum, New York, USA, 2017
- Watching You, Watching Me, BOZAR, Centre for Fine Arts, Brussels, Belgium, 2018
- Stateless: Views of Global Migration, MoCP, Chicago, USA, 2019
- Sanctuary: Building a House Without Walls, St. John the Divine, New York, USA, 2019
- WALLS, Annenberg Center for Photography, Los Angeles, USA, 2019
- FLUX, Photaumnales festival, Le Quadrilatère, Beauvais, France, 2020
- SEND ME AN IMAGE, C/O Foundation, Berlin, Germany, 2021
- MONUMENTAL, Rencontres d'Arles, The VII Foundation, Arles, France, 2024

== Films ==
- Far West – The Hidden History, 2021 documentary (54 minutes), co-director & cinematographer
- Separated, 2024 documentary directed by Errol Morris (91 minutes), contributed the aerial footage for the opening scene

== Other activities ==
Since 2015, Tomas van Houtryve has been invited as a lecturer and educator by several institutions including the University of Colorado at Boulder, the Institut d'études politiques de Paris, the academy of the VII Foundation, and Columbia University. Teacher's guides and lesson plans have been created based on van Houtryve's works by the Pulitzer Center and Stanford University.

Tomas van Houtryve is a lifelong cyclist, having toured through the Himalayas, Rocky Mountains, and the Alps by bicycle. He participated in NORBA national level mountain bike competitions and non-competitive events including L'Eroica in Tuscany.
