= VII Photo Agency =

International photographic cooperative

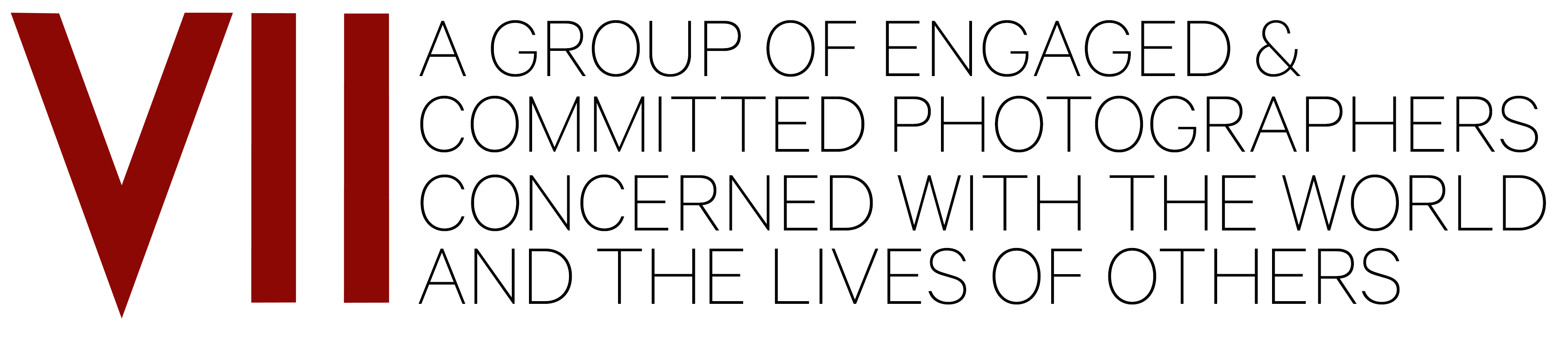
- Company type: LLC
- Industry: Photography
- Founded: 2001
- Founder: Gary Knight, John Stanmeyer, Alexandra Boulat, Ron Haviv, Antonín Kratochvíl, Christopher Morris, James Nachtwey
- Headquarters: New York City
- Area served: Worldwide
- Products: Photojournalism, photo agency
- Website: viiphoto.com

VII Photo Agency is an international photo agency wholly owned and governed by its membership.

== History ==
The photographer owned agency was originally conceived by Gary Knight and John Stanmeyer. They were subsequently joined by Alexandra Boulat, Ron Haviv, Antonín Kratochvíl, Christopher Morris, and James Nachtwey and the agency, named after the number of founding members, was launched at the Visa pour l'image Festival in Perpignan, France, in September, 2001. VII was conceived to operate as a means of digital image distribution and representation wholly owned and controlled by the photographers it represented in response to large corporations acquiring the small photo agencies present in the industry at the time. Today the agency represents 29 members and 10 mentees.

VII established its reputation for news coverage during the war in Afghanistan that followed 9/11 and during the conflict in Israel/Palestine in 2002 and the invasion and occupation of Iraq in 2003. Their first assignment was photographing 9/11. James Nachtwey, one of the founding members of VII was packing his bags to go on an assignment for Time Magazine in the Caribbean. He looked out of his window near Wall Street in New York and saw everyone in the street looking up at the sky. He saw flames coming out of the World Trade Center just a few blocks from his apartment. Nachtwey spent the next hours photographing as the Twin Towers collapsed, killing thousands of civilians. The other six founding members of the agency flew from Europe to the USA or to Afghanistan, where they covered the fall of the Taliban, and unimaginable to them at the time, the beginning of America’s longest war. VII focused much of its energy in the ensuing years documenting the wars and violence that followed in the Middle East, wars that have killed hundreds of thousands of civilians.

From being principally focused on news for editorial clients, the agency has diversified into social media, live events, video, and creative partnerships with NGOs / colleges / universities, exhibitions in leading museums, featured appearances at major art and photo festivals, and education.

In addition to the member photographers, young photographers are mentored by full members through the VII Mentor Program and represented by the agency.The VII Mentor Program was created in 2008 and is the first mentor program of its kind. Former mentees have gone on to build successful careers in the media. Some of them are now members of VII, Noor, and Magnum photo agencies and are working on assignments for publications like The New York Times, Time Magazine, and National Geographic.

In 2018, VII was named in a story by a journalist, Kristen Chick, which was published in the Columbia Journalism Review detailing accusations of sexually harassing behavior by a founding member, Antonin Kratochvil, against former VII members (Anastasia Taylor-Lind and Stephanie Sinclair), and accusations by them of a toxic culture amongst the VII members which enabled such behavior. Kratochvil subsequently resigned from the Agency. As a result of the accusations, VII instated a systemic change in culture, obliging all members and staff to fulfill online HR, compliance and harassment training with Emtrain and created a strict code of ethics for all members and staff.

== Member list ==
Name	Based In	Member
Ali Arkady	Iraq	2020–present
Anush Babjanyan	Armenia	2017–present
Philip Blenkinsop	UK	2017–present
Jocelyn Bain Hogg	UK	2007–present
Alexandra Boulat (Estate)	France	2001–2007 Founding Member (Deceased)
Eric Bouvet	France	2017–present
Linda Bournane Engleberth	Norway	2018–present
Sim Chi Yin	Singapore	2014 (interim) – 2016 (full) – 2017 (left)
Stefano De Luigi	France	2007–present
Jessica Dimmock	USA	2007–present
Danny Wilcox Frazier	USA	2015–present
Ziyah Gafic	Bosnia	2017–present
Mary Gelman	Russia	2020–present
Ashley Gilbertson	Australia	2008–present
Ron Haviv	USA	2001–present Founding Member
Ed Kashi	USA	2001–present
Gary Knight	UK	2001–present Founding Member
Antonín Kratochvíl	Czechia	2001–2018 Founding Member
Joachim Ladefoged	Denmark	2004–present
Paul Lowe	UK	2017–2024 (Deceased)
Davide Monteleone	Italy	2011–2015
Christopher Morris	USA	2001–present Founding Member
Seamus Murphy	Ireland	2017–present
Maciek Nabrdalik	Poland	2008–present
James Nachtwey	USA	2001–2011 Founding Member
Ilvy Nijokiktjen	Netherlands	2017–present
Franco Pagetti	Italy	2007–present
Sarker Protick	Bangladesh	2015–2017
Espen Rasmussen	Norway	2020–present
Eugene Richards	USA	2005–2008
Stephanie Sinclair	USA	2009–2017
Daniel Schwartz	Switzerland	2017–present
Nichole Sobecki	USA	2017–present
John Stanmeyer	USA	2001–present Founding Member
Maggie Steber	USA	2017–present
Anastasia Taylor-Lind	UK	2014–2017
Sara Terry	USA	2017–present
Tomas van Houtryve	France	2010–present
Donald Weber	Canada	2008–2015

== Projects ==
=== Newest Americans: Stories From the Global City ===
Newest Americans is a three-year longitudinal study at Rutgers University–Newark that will document the lives and communities of students at the university and take an in-depth look at immigration and the idea of American identity. It is a collaborative effort involving VII, Rutger's Center for Migration and the Global City (CMGC) and the Department of Arts, Culture and Media. The project, spearheaded by Tim Raphael, director of CMGC, focuses on immigrant experiences in New Jersey with Newark as the hub where these different stories converge. Notes for My Homeland was produced by Talking Eyes Media and is the first professionally produced piece in the storytelling project.

=== Evolution Tour ===
For the Evolution Tour, photojournalists from VII Photo Agency, along with technical specialists from AbelCine, presented an examination of the evolving business, technology and craft of visual storytelling. This program was structured as a combination of seminars, panel discussions, hands-on workshops and networking.

=== European Workshops Series ===
In 2015, Ed Kashi, Ron Haviv, Marcus Bleasdale, Stefano De Luigi and John Stanmeyer, all members of VII Photo Agency led photography workshops in four European capitals: Paris, Barcelona, Amsterdam and Berlin, as part of the Eyes in Progress's workshops program.

=== Fatal Neglect ===
Through a partnership between VII, Médecins Sans Frontières (MSF, also known as Doctors Without Borders), and UNION HZ, Fatal Neglect was a multi-part documentary film project, to tell the stories of the millions of patients left behind by the global health revolution. In Fatal Neglect: The Global Health Revolution's Forgotten Patients, VII documented the impact of multidrug-resistant tuberculosis and some of the deadliest neglected tropical diseases: “kala azar,” and “sleeping sickness.” Ron Haviv and John Stanmeyer traveled to capture the stories of frontline health workers trying to fight diseases that affect millions of people and kill hundreds of thousands each year yet garner little attention from drug developers, policy makers or the mass media.

=== Starved for Attention ===
In 2010, MSF and VII launched “Starved for Attention,” a multimedia campaign about childhood malnutrition. Petition signatures were collected from people around the world who joined the partnership in demanding that donor nations stop supplying nutritionally substandard food to malnourished children.

== People who have been involved with the VII Mentor Program ==
Name	Based In !
Sharafat Ali	India
Juan Pablo Ampudia	Mexico
Ali Arkady (Current Member)	Iraq
Debsuddha Banerjee	India
Poulomi Basu	India
Arthur Bondar	Ukraine
Sim Chi Yin (Current Magnum Photo Member)	Singapore
Kimberly dela Cruz	Philippines
Grace Ekpu	Nigeria
Maika Elan	Vietnam
Nada Harib	Libya
Joshua Irwandi	Indonesia
M'hammed Kilito	Morocco
Jošt Franko	Slovenia
Maciek Nabrdalik (Current Member)	Poland
Cristobal Olivares	Chile
Marko Risovic	Serbia
Anastasia Taylor-Lind	UK
Farshid Tighehsaz	Iran
