= Jashim Salam =

Bangladeshi journalist (born 1978)

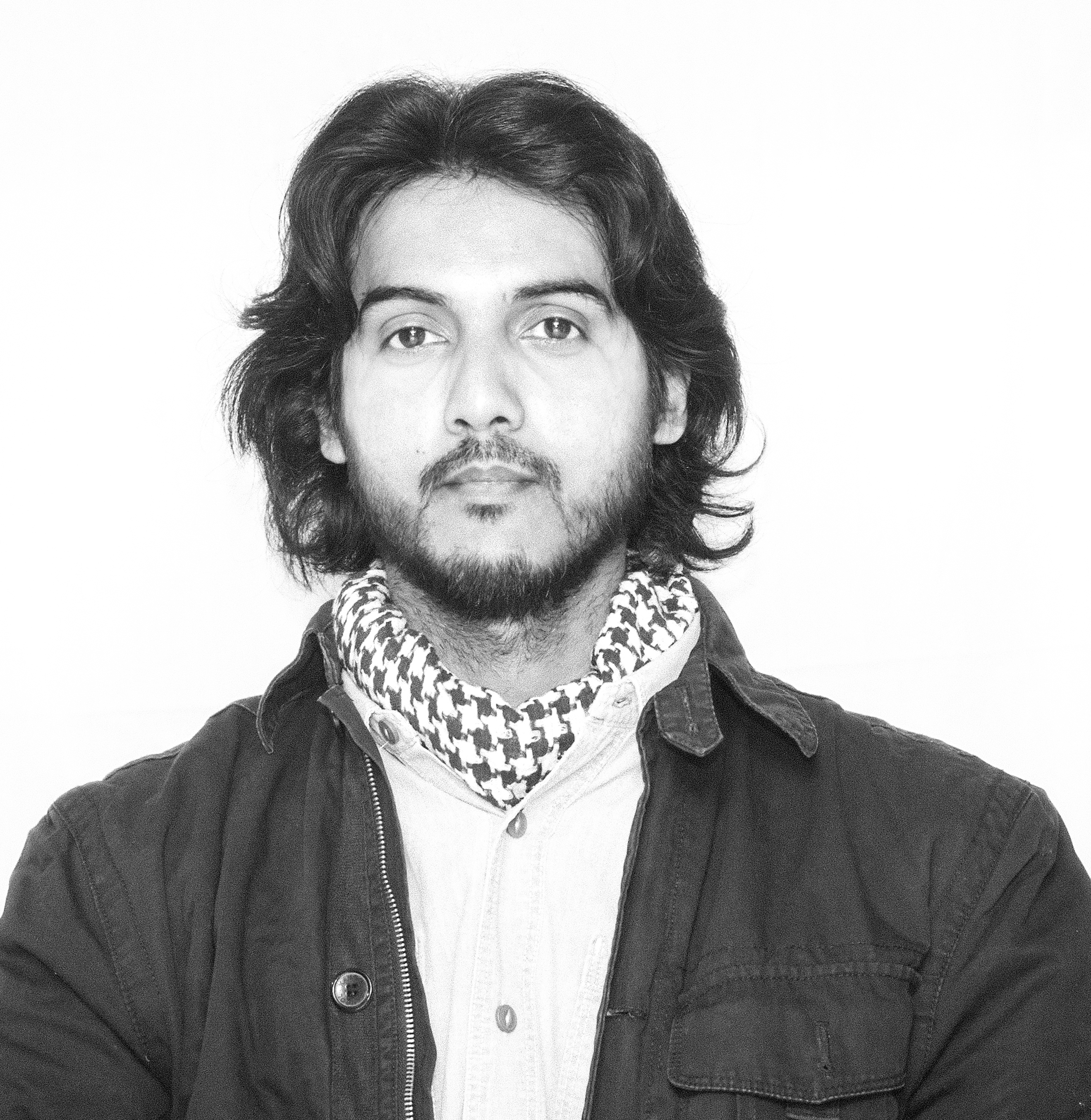
- Born: Chittagong, Bangladesh
- Education: Ateneo de Manila University Pathshala, South Asian Media Academy
- Occupation: Photojournalist
- Years active: 2004- present
- Known for: Documentary photography
- Website: jashimsalam.com

Jashim Salam (born 1978) is a Bangladeshi documentary photographer and photojournalist.

== Biography ==
Salam graduated in photography from Pathshala South Asian Media Institute. He has studied a post Graduation Diploma in Visual Journalism through a scholarship program of World Press Photo at the Konrad Adenauer Asian Center for Journalism (ACFJ) at Ateneo de Manila University in the Philippines. He has been teaching, mentoring photography in workshops and seminars for aspiring young photographers regularly and has also been on the jury boards of numerous photography contests in Bangladesh. Social photo-documentary, portraits are among his interests. He started his photographic career with DrikNEWS agency. He worked for New Age an English daily of Bangladesh, Drik picture agency, Majority world, Nur photo agency, and Corbis images.

His work has been featured in the exhibitions and screening worldwide, including Visa Pour l'Image, in Perpignan, The Photoville festival in New York, Berlin Parliament in Germany, Atrium of the Town Hall, The Hague, Netherlands, Maison familiale Pro Juventute, Geneva, The Getty Images Gallery, London, Gallery of the French Alliance Foundation Paris, France.

== Awards ==
- 2nd spotlight fotovisura grant, 2013
- 1st prize Gold, 3rd Asian Press Photo contest, 2012
- 1st prize in Emirates photography award, 2011
- Ian Parry scholarship (Commended), 2011
- OpenWalls Arles 2020 Winner
