= Maika Elan =

Vietnamese photographer

Nguyen Thanh Hai (born 1986), known professionally as Maika Elan, is a freelance photographer born in Hanoi, Vietnam. Elan is known for her first project, The Pink Choice, that focuses on the personal lives of gay couples in Vietnam. In 2013 Elan won first prize in the Contemporary Issues category of World Press Photo with The Pink Choice and was a participant in the Joop Swart masterclass in Amsterdam. She was selected for the VII mentor program from 2014–2016.

== Education ==
Elan attended the University of Social Sciences and Humanities in Hanoi and studied Sociology.

== The Pink Choice ==
In 2010, Elan moved from editorial clients and fashion firms to documentary photography. The Pink Choice focused on homosexual couples in everyday life of Vietnam. She was not sure if she wanted to continue her work collecting photographs of gay couples but decided to keep pursuing the project when she noticed the lack of representation on the subject. "None of the pictures she saw revealed the faces of their subjects. Many were shot from the back, and some wore masks. They were stereotypical- even harsh-depictions of love."

The previous representation of the LGBT community in Vietnam was almost non-existent and Maika wanted to make sure they were depicted as real people. After being with each couple for a few days, she realized that they were more comfortable showing love in their homes. She decided to take all the photographs in private moments at home where they felt more like they could be themselves and not be criticized by the public outside. Homosexual people face homophobia from society and their families in Vietnam, so the display of real people in real relationships is critical.

Elan stated, "The Pink Choice is a series of photos and the love of homosexual couples which focus on living spaces, the affectionate touches, and more importantly, the synchronized rhythm of lovers sharing life together. Viewers may not feel the personalities of the subjects in the photos, but hopefully they can feel the warmth of their love and caring. In way, I wanted to show what I see of homosexual people and not how they see themselves."

Elan was awarded "the best photo essay" and the "best single photo" at the Indochina Media Memorial Foundation, in 2010, for The Pink Choice. In 2013 Elan won first prize in the Contemporary Issues category of World Press Photo with The Pink Choice.
