= John Stanmeyer =

American photojournalist

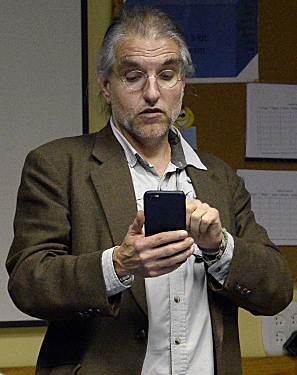
John Stanmeyer, January 2016

John Stanmeyer (born March 1964), is an American photojournalist based in Otis, Massachusetts. He is one of the founders of VII Photo Agency. Stanmeyer has received the World Press Photo of the Year, Robert Capa Gold Medal, Magazine Photographer of the Year from Pictures of the Year International, and a National Magazine Award for Photojournalism.

== Life and work ==
His career began at the Tampa Tribune in Tampa, Florida where he began working on international assignments traveling to various African and European countries and India. He then shifted his focus to freelance work on Asian and Middle-Eastern events. His work has centered on Asian and Middle-Eastern political and human rights issues for the past 11 years, and more recently on the environment and sustainability.

He has contributed to Time and National Geographic.

In 2016, along with Anush Babajanyan and Serra Akcan, he started Bridging Stories, a photography training programme for Turks and Armenians to take and share pictures of their daily life on Instagram, in order to promote understanding between their peoples.

== Book ==
- Island of the Spirits. Afterhours, 2010. ISBN 978-6029750713.

== Awards ==
- 1999: Robert Capa Gold Medal for "The Killing of Bernardino Guterres in Dili, East Timor", SABA for Time.
- 2008: National Magazine Award for Photojournalism.
- 2013: World Press Photo of the Year from World Press Photo, Amsterdam, for a photograph of African migrants on the shore of Djibouti city at night.

== See also ==
- Shahidul Alam
- Jashim Salam
