= Alexandra Boulat =

French photographer

- Born: 2 May 1962; Paris, France
- Died: 5 October 2007 (aged 45); Paris, France
- Known for: Photography
- Awards: World Press Photo Award for Arts and Entertainment

Alexandra Boulat (2 May 1962 – 5 October 2007) was a French photographer born in Paris. In 2001, she co-founded the VII Photo Agency. Her work has appeared in many magazines, including Time, Newsweek, Paris Match and National Geographic Magazine and she received numerous international awards.

== Life and work ==
She was trained in graphic art and art history at the École des Beaux-Arts in Paris.

Before co-founding the VII Photo Agency in 2001 she had been represented by Sipa Press and by her mother's agency, Cosmos.

Since 2006 she had been concentrating primarily on the conflict in Gaza.

In June 2007, she suffered a ruptured brain aneurysm, and spent three weeks in a hospital in Israel in a medically induced coma. She was moved to France, where she remained in a coma. Thousands of colleagues and fans had expressed support for her. Boulat died in her sleep in Paris on 5 October 2007.
