= Antonín Kratochvíl =

American photojournalist

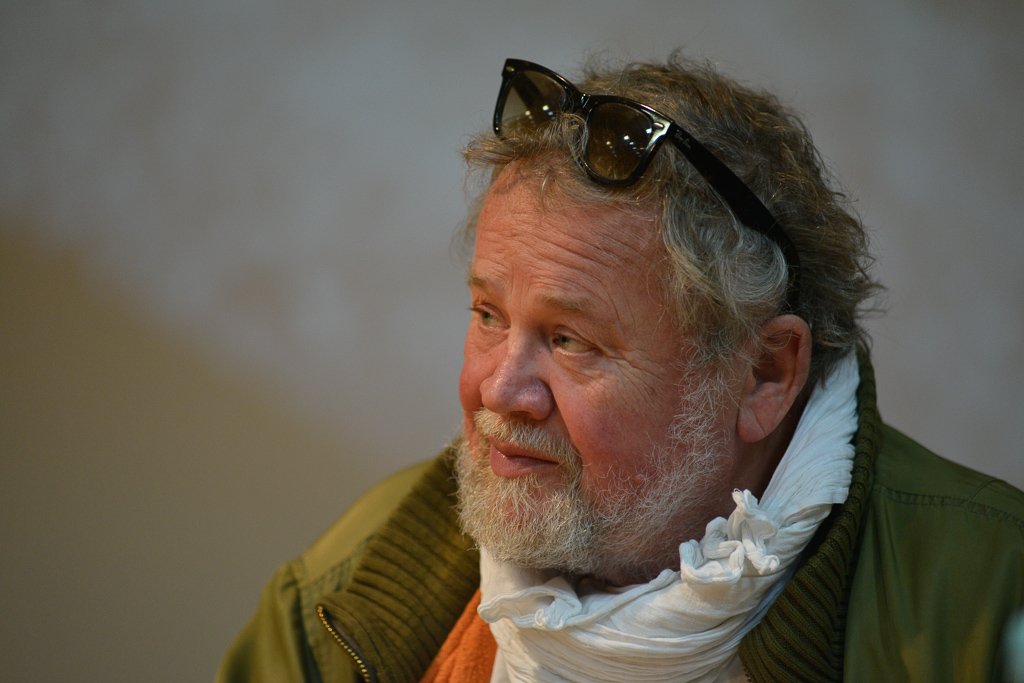
Kratochvíl in 2017 during FotoArtFestival

Antonín Kratochvíl (also written Antonin Kratochvil; born 12 April 1947) is a Czech-born American photojournalist. He is a founding member of VII Photo Agency.

== Life and work ==
Kratochvíl was born in 1947 in Lovosice, Czechoslovakia. He gained a BFA in Photography from Gerrit Rietveld Academie, Amsterdam.

He has photographed Mongolia's street children for the magazine of the American Museum of Natural History and the Iraq War for Fortune.

He was suspended from VII Photo Agency in 2017 after sexual harassment allegations were made. He denied that they ever happened.

Sarah K. Stanley, in an essay on Kratochvíl's book Vanishing, called it "a unique compilation of images by a photographer who is distinguished by his great sensitivity to the plight of humans beings and animal species seeking survival in endangered habitats."

== Publications ==
=== Publications by Kratochvíl ===
- Broken Dream: 20 Years of War in Eastern Europe. New York: Monacelli, 1997. ISBN 9781885254788.
- Incognito. Santa Fe, NM: Arena, 2001. ISBN 9781892041456. With a short introduction by Billy Bob Thornton and an interview by Mark Jacobson.
- Sopravvivere. Milan: F. Motta, 2001. ISBN 9788871793191. Catalog of an exhibition held at the Galleria Grazia Neri, Milan.
- Antonin Kratochvil. FotoTorst series no. 12. Prague: Torst, 2003. ISBN 9788072152001. English and Czech.
- Vanishing. New York: de.MO, 2005. ISBN 978-0970576835.
- Persona: Portraits. Slovart, 2006. ISBN 978-8072097838. With an introduction by Michael Persson.

=== Publications with contributions by Kratochvíl ===
- Spirits and Ghosts: Journeys Through Mongolia. New York: powerHouse, 2003. ISBN 9781576871676. By Julia Calfee. Edited and with an introduction by Kratochvíl.
- Endure: Renewal from Ground Zero. New York: Rockefeller Foundation, 2001. ISBN 0891840613. By Kratochvíl, Jurek Wajdowicz, Carolina Salguero, Larry Towell and Alex Webb.

== Awards ==
- 1991: Infinity Award: Photojournalist of the Year, International Center of Photography, New York City
- 1994: Dorothy Lange Prize
- 1995: Hasselblad Foundation Grant for Photography
- 1998: 1st prize, Portraits, Stories, World Press Photo, Amsterdam
- 2003: 1st prize, Nature, Singles, World Press Photo, Amsterdam
- 2005: Outstanding Achievement in Photojournalism, Lucie Awards
