= Photojournalism =

Using images to tell a news story

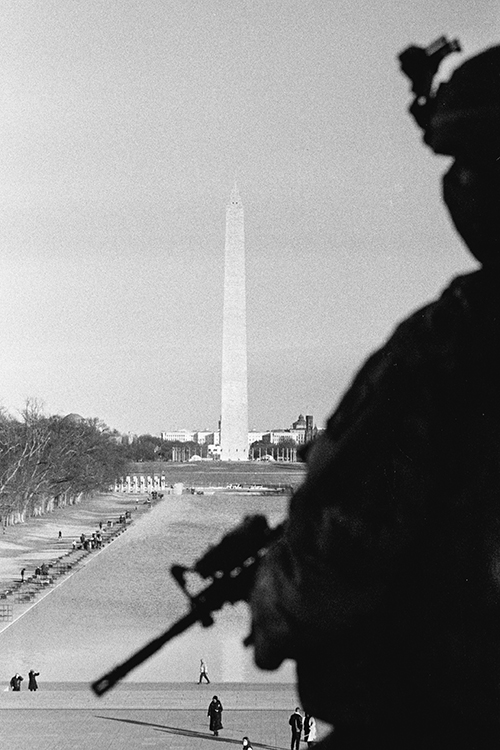
Black-and-white photograph of a National Guardsman looking over the Washington Monument in Washington, D.C., on 21 January 2021, the day after the inauguration of Joe Biden as the 46th president of the United States

Photojournalism is journalism that uses images to tell a news story. It usually only refers to still images, but can also refer to video used in broadcast journalism. Photojournalism is distinguished from other close branches of photography (such as documentary photography, social documentary photography, war photography, street photography and celebrity photography) by having a rigid ethical framework which demands an honest and impartial approach that tells a story in strictly journalistic terms. Photojournalists contribute to the news media, and help communities connect with one another. They must be well-informed and knowledgeable, and are able to deliver news in a creative manner that is both informative and entertaining.

Similar to a writer, a photojournalist is a reporter, but they must often make decisions instantly and carry photographic equipment, often while exposed to significant obstacles, among them immediate physical danger, bad weather, large crowds, and limited physical access to their subjects.

== History ==
=== Origins in war photography ===
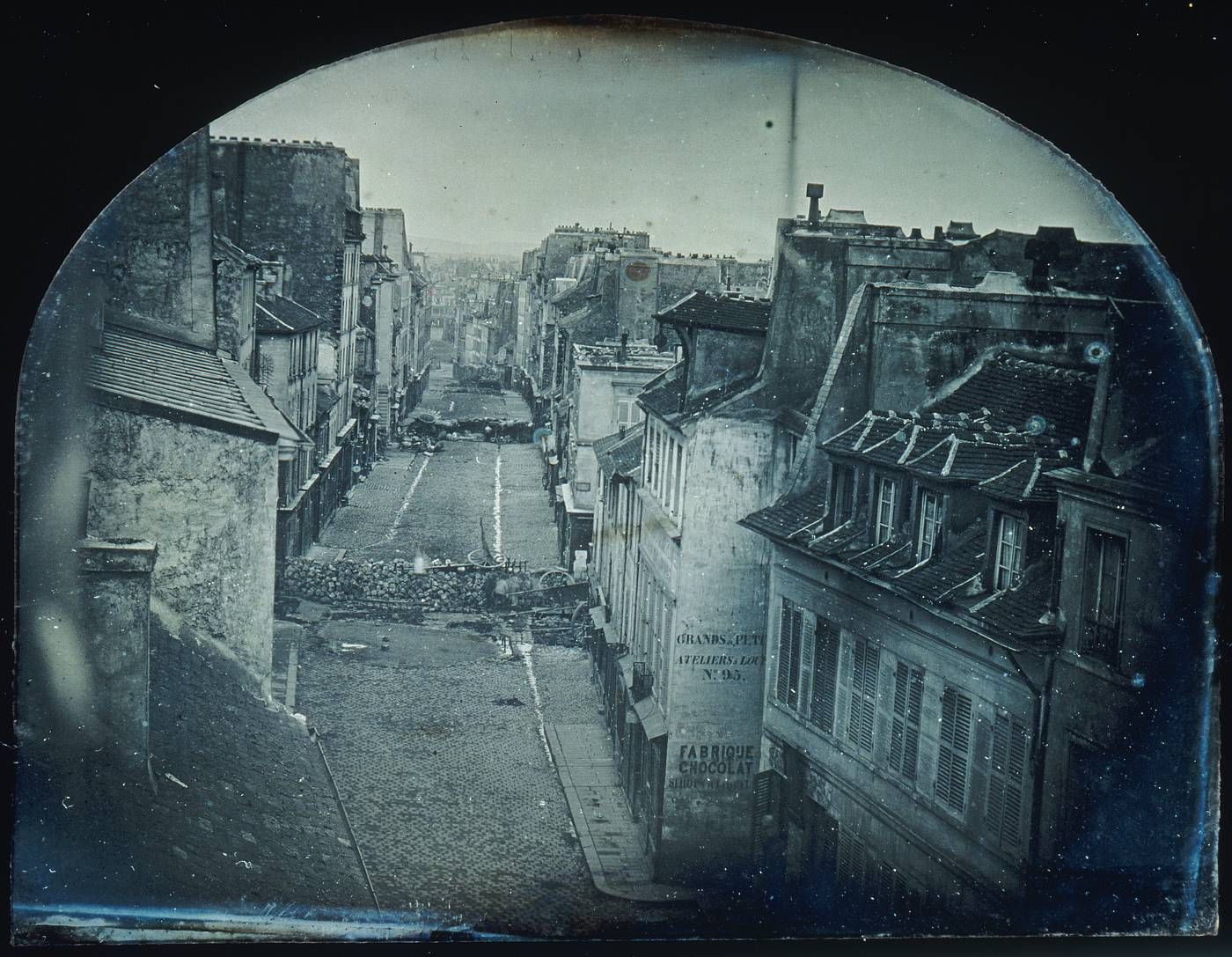
Barricades on rue Saint-Maur (1848), the first photo used to illustrate a newspaper story

The practice of illustrating news stories with photographs was made possible by printing and photography innovations that occurred in the mid 19th century. Although early illustrations had appeared in newspapers, such as an illustration of the funeral of Lord Horatio Nelson in The Times (1806), the first weekly illustrated newspaper was the Illustrated London News, first printed in 1842. The illustrations were printed with the use of engravings.

The first photograph to be used in illustration of a newspaper story was a depiction of barricades in Paris during the June Days uprising taken on 25 June 1848; the photo was published as an engraving in L'Illustration of 1–8 July 1848.

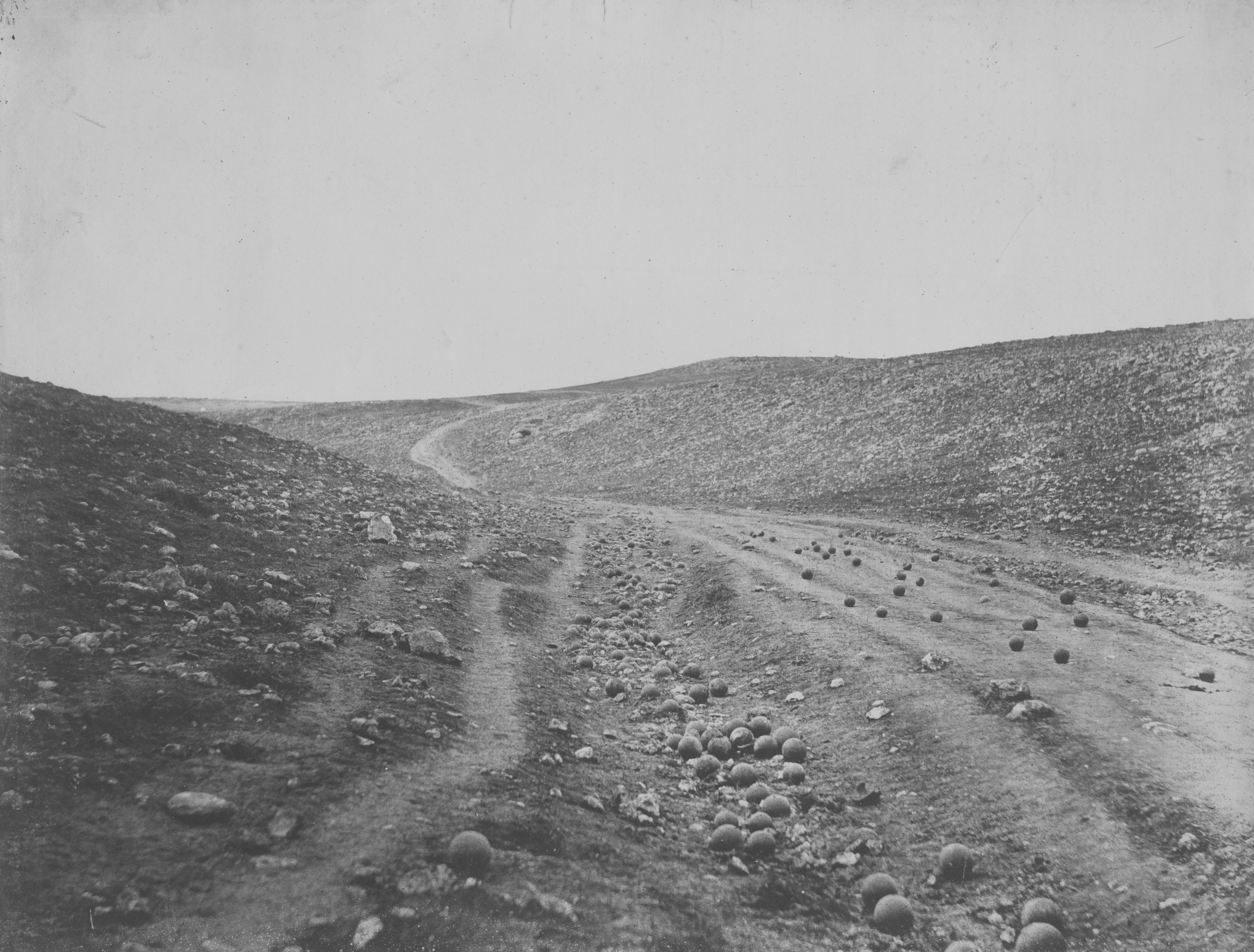
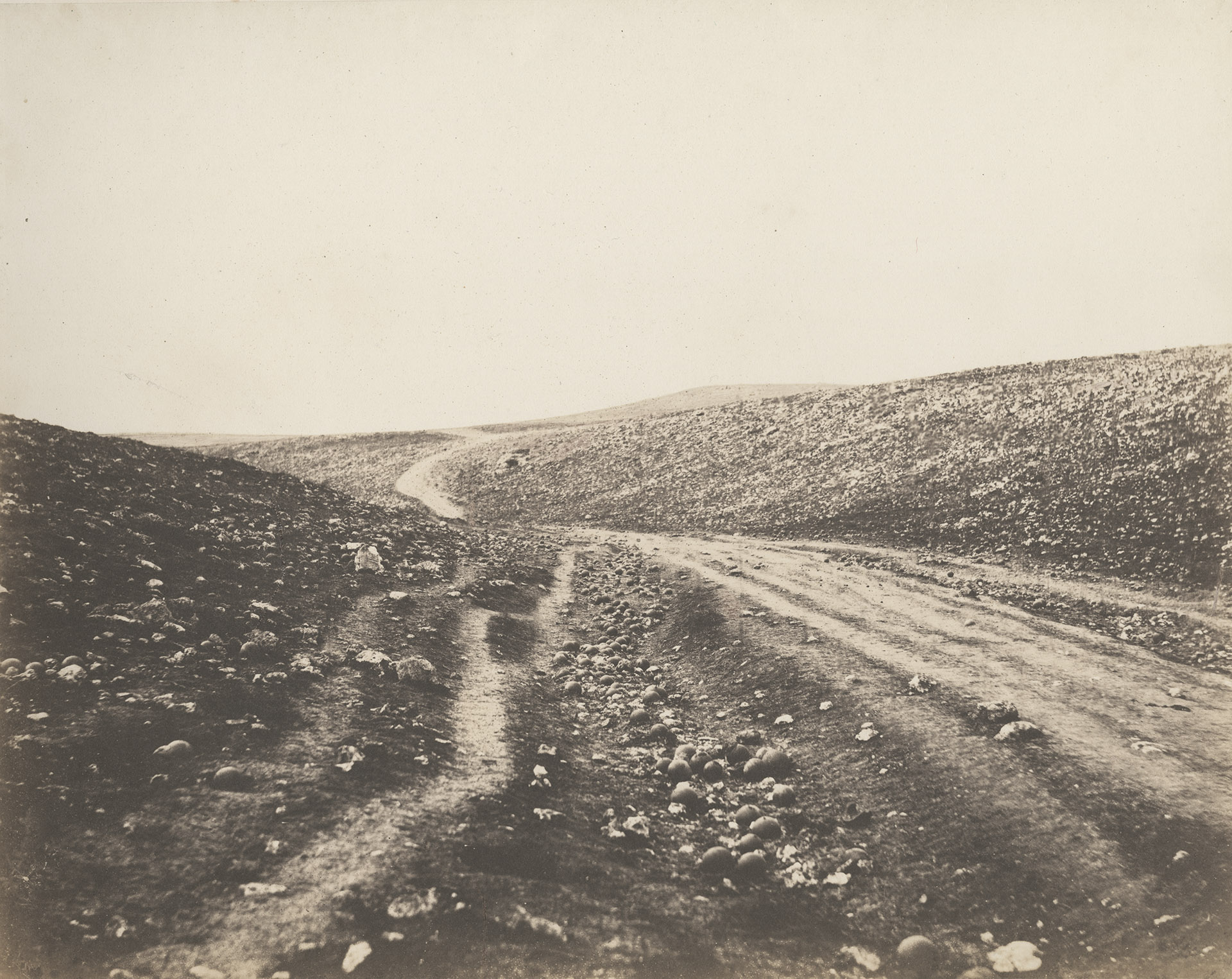
Versions of Roger Fenton's Valley of the Shadow of Death, with and without cannonballs on the road

During the Crimean War, the ILN pioneered the birth of early photojournalism by printing pictures of the war that had been taken by Roger Fenton. Fenton was the first official war photographer and his work included documenting the effects of the war on the troops, panoramas of the landscapes where the battles took place, model representations of the action, and portraits of commanders, which laid the groundwork for modern photojournalism. Other photographers of the war included William Simpson and Carol Szathmari. Similarly, the American Civil War photographs of Mathew Brady were engraved before publication in Harper's Weekly. The technology had not yet developed to the point of being able to print photographs in newspapers, which greatly restricted the audience of Brady's photographs. However, it was still common for photographs to be engraved and subsequently printed in newspapers or periodicals throughout the war. Disaster, including train wrecks and city fires, was also a popular subject for illustrated newspapers in the early days.

=== Expansion ===
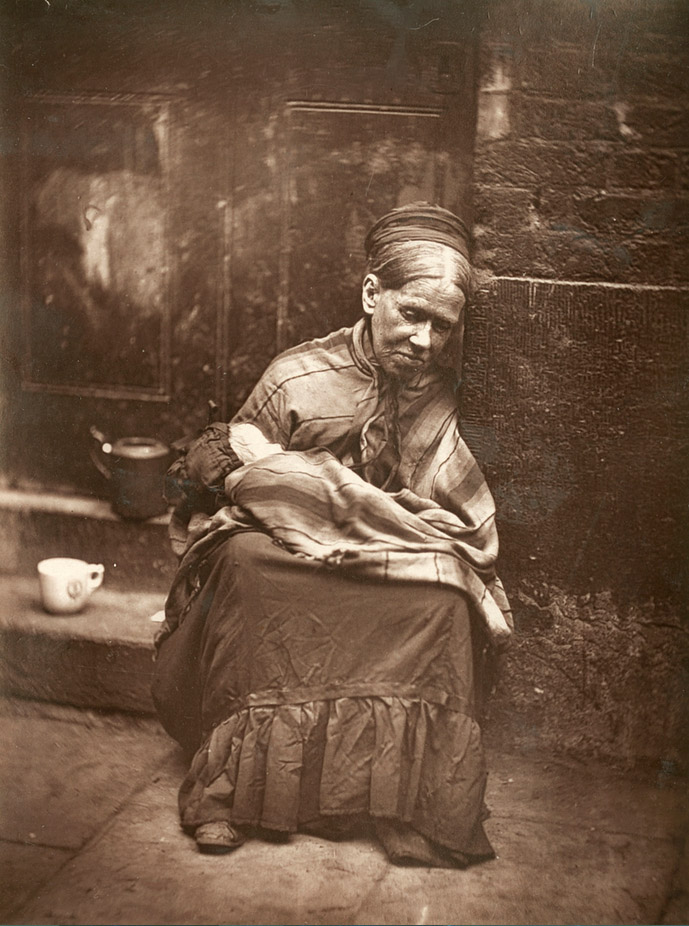
The Crawlers, London, 1876–1877, a photograph from John Thomson's Street Life in London photo-documentary

The printing of images in newspapers remained an isolated occurrence in this period. Photos were used to enhance the text rather than to act as a medium of information in its own right. This began to change with the work of one of the pioneers of photojournalism, John Thomson, in the late 1870s. In collaboration with the radical journalist Adolphe Smith, he began publishing a monthly magazine, Street Life in London, from 1876 to 1877. The project documented in photographs and text, the lives of the street people of London and established social documentary photography as a form of photojournalism. Instead of the images acting as a supplement to the text, he pioneered the use of printed photographs as the predominant medium for the imparting of information, successfully combining photography with the printed word.

On 4 March 1880, the Daily Graphic in New York published the first halftone (rather than engraved) reproduction of a news photograph.

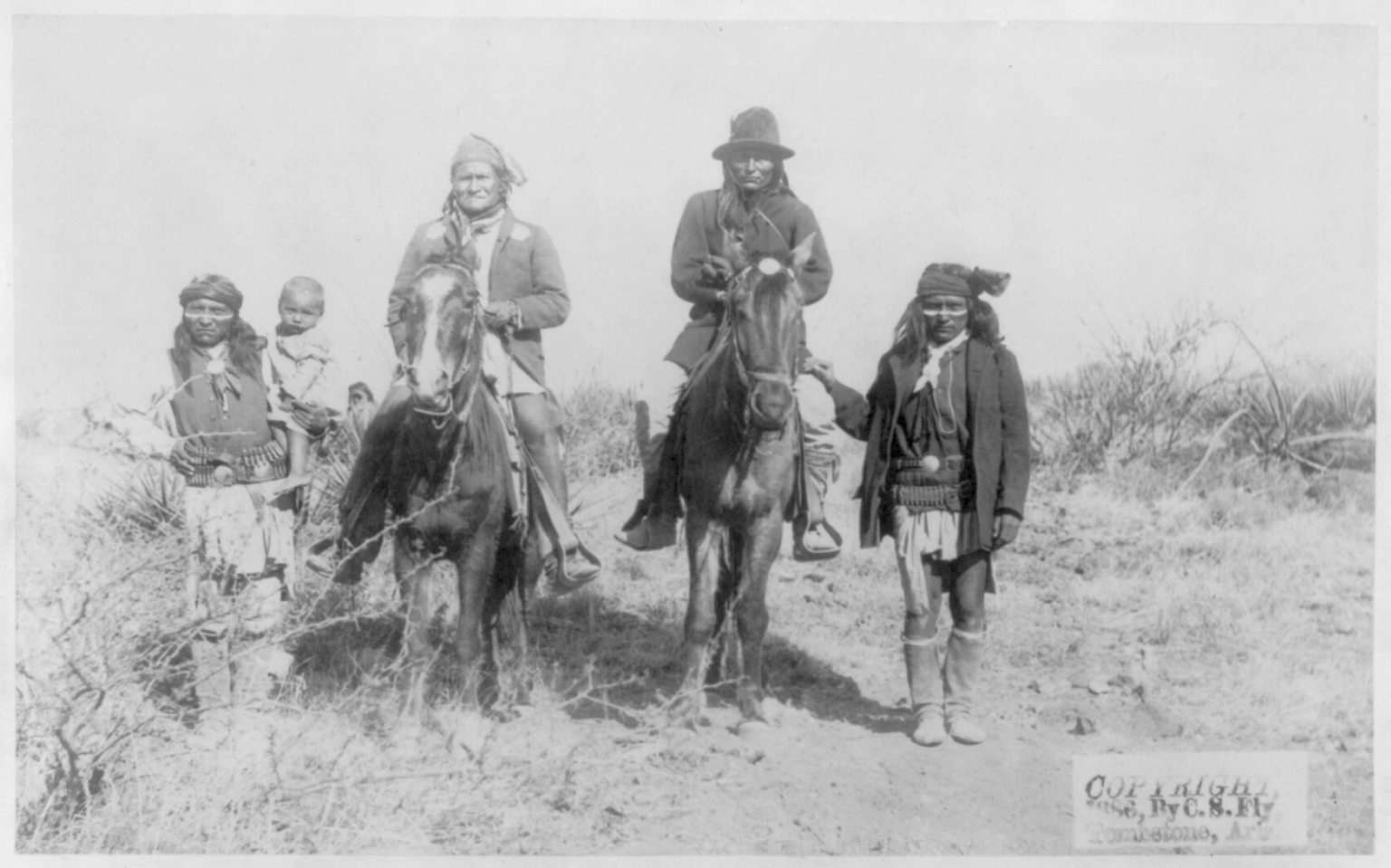
"Geronimo's camp before surrender to General Crook, 27 March 1886: Geronimo and Natches mounted; Geronimo's son (Perico) standing at his side holding baby." By C. S. Fly.

In March 1886, when General George Crook received word that the Apache leader Geronimo would negotiate surrender terms, photographer C. S. Fly took his equipment and attached himself to the military column. During the three days of negotiations, Fly took about 15 exposures on 200 by 250 mm (8 by 10 in) glass negatives. His photos of Geronimo and the other free Apaches, taken on 25 and 26 March, are the only known photographs taken of American Indians while still at war with the United States. Fly coolly posed his subjects, asking them to move and turn their heads and faces, to improve his composition. The popular publication Harper's Weekly published six of his images in their 24 April 1886 issue.

In 1887, flash powder was invented, enabling journalists such as Jacob Riis to photograph informal subjects indoors, which led to the landmark 1890 book How the Other Half Lives. By 1897, it became possible to reproduce halftone photographs on printing presses running at full speed.

In France, agencies such as Rol, Branger, and Chusseau-Flaviens (ca. 1880–1910) syndicated photographs from around the world to meet the need for timely new illustration. Despite these innovations, limitations remained, and many of the sensational newspaper and magazine stories in the period from 1897 to 1927 were illustrated with engravings. In 1921, the wirephoto made it possible to transmit pictures almost as quickly as news itself could travel.

=== Golden age ===
The "Golden Age of Photojournalism" is often considered to be roughly the 1930s through the 1950s. It was made possible by the development of the compact commercial 35mm Leica Camera in 1925, and the first flash bulbs between 1927 and 1930, which allowed the journalist true flexibility in taking pictures.

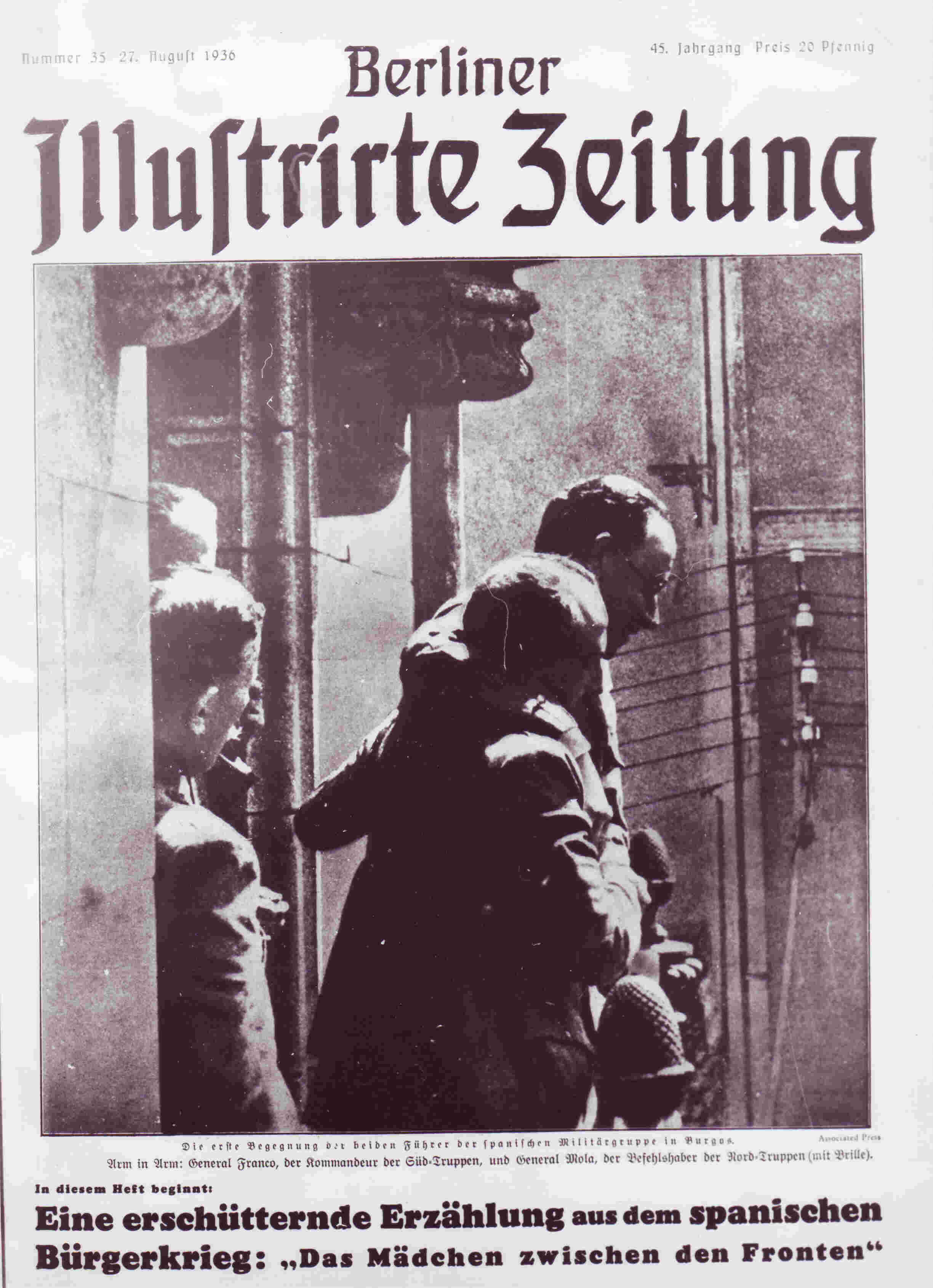
The Berliner Illustrirte Zeitung pioneered modern photojournalism and was widely copied. Pictured, the cover of issue of 26 August 1936: a meeting between Francisco Franco and Emilio Mola.

A new style of magazine and newspaper appeared that used photography more than text to tell stories. The Berliner Illustrirte Zeitung was the first to pioneer the format of the illustrated news magazine. Beginning in 1901, it began to print photographs inside the magazine, a revolutionary innovation. In the successive decades, it was developed into the prototype of the modern news magazine.

It pioneered the photo-essay, had a specialised staff and production unit for pictures and maintained a photo library. It also introduced the use of candid photographs taken with the new smaller cameras.

The magazine sought out reporters who could tell a story using photographs, notably the pioneer sports photographer Martin Munkácsi, the first staff photographer, and Erich Salomon, one of the founders of photojournalism.

Other magazines included, Arbeiter-Illustrierte-Zeitung (Berlin), Vu (France), Life (USA), Look (USA), Picture Post (London); and newspapers, The Daily Mirror (London) and The New York Daily News. Famous photographers of the era included Robert Capa, Romano Cagnoni, Alfred Eisenstaedt, Margaret Bourke-White and W. Eugene Smith.

Henri Cartier-Bresson is held by some to be the father of modern photojournalism, although this appellation has been applied to various other photographers, such as Erich Salomon, whose candid pictures of political figures were novel in the 1930s.

The photojournalism of, for example, Agustí Centelles played an important role in the propaganda efforts of the Republican side in the Spanish Civil War in the late 1930s.

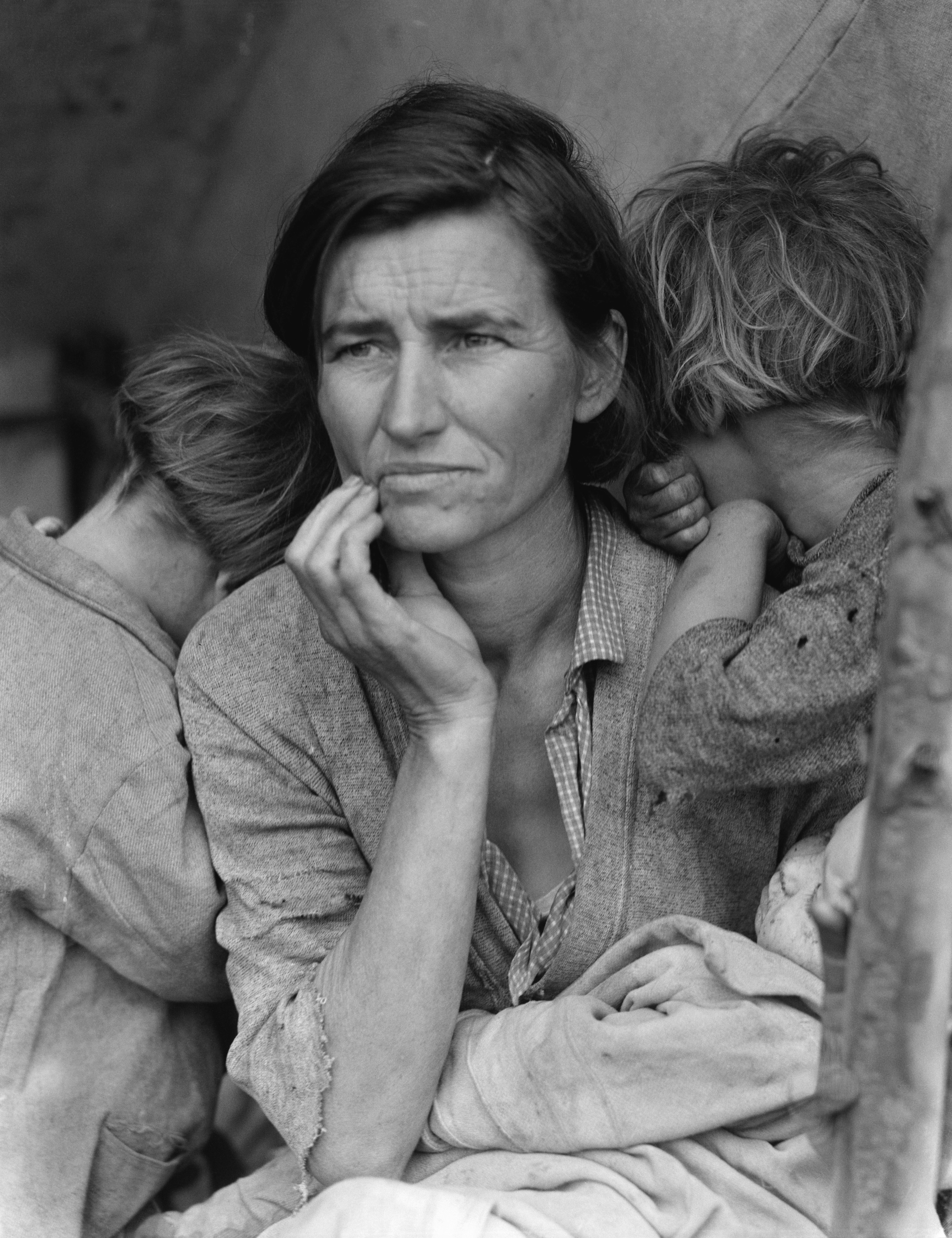
In Migrant Mother (1936) Dorothea Lange produced the seminal image of the Great Depression. The FSA also employed several other photojournalists to document the depression.

American journalist Julien Bryan photographed and filmed the beginning of the Second World War being under heavy German bombardment in September 1939 in Poland. He was pioneer worker in color photography, Kodachrome.

William Vandivert photographed in color the German bombardment of London called the Blitz in 1940.

Soldier Tony Vaccaro is also recognized as one of the pre-eminent photographers of World War II. His images taken with the modest Argus C3 captured horrific moments in war, similar to Capa's Spanish soldier being shot. Capa himself was on Omaha Beach on D-Day and captured pivotal images of the conflict on that occasion. Vaccaro is also known for having developed his own images in soldier's helmets, and using chemicals found in the ruins of a camera store in 1944.

Until the 1980s, most large newspapers were printed with turn-of-the-century "letterpress" technology using easily smudged oil-based ink, off-white, low-quality "newsprint" paper, and coarse engraving screens. While letterpresses produced legible text, the photoengraving dots that formed pictures often bled or smeared and became fuzzy and indistinct. In this way, even when newspapers used photographs well — a good crop, a respectable size — murky reproduction often left readers re-reading the caption to see what the photo was all about. The Wall Street Journal adopted stippled hedcuts in 1979 to publish portraits and avoid the limitations of letterpress printing. Not until the 1980s did a majority of newspapers switch to "offset" presses that reproduce photos with fidelity on better, whiter paper.

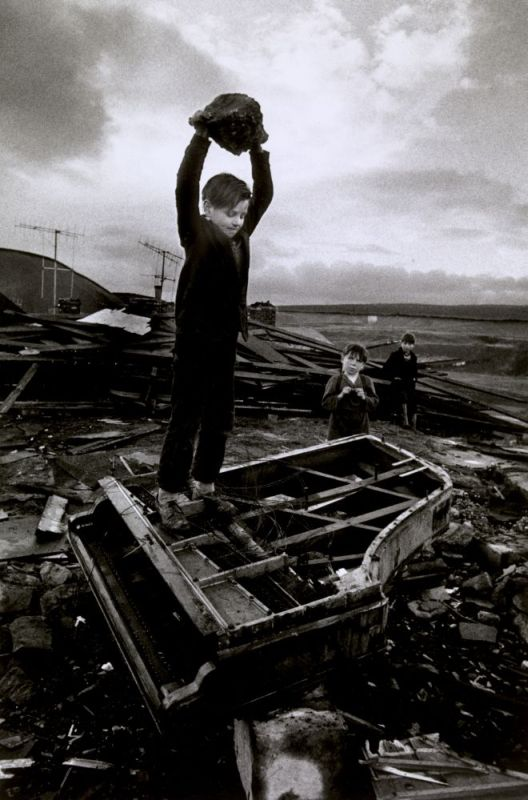
Boy destroying piano at Pant-y-Waen, South Wales, by Philip Jones Griffiths, 1961

By contrast Life, one of America's most popular weekly magazines from 1936 through the early 1970s, was filled with photographs reproduced beautifully on oversize 280 by 360 mm (11 by 14 in) pages, using fine engraving screens, high-quality inks, and glossy paper. Life often published a United Press International (UPI) or Associated Press (AP) photo that had been first reproduced in newspapers, but the quality magazine version appeared to be a different photo altogether. In large part because their pictures were clear enough to be appreciated, and because their name always appeared with their work, magazine photographers achieved near-celebrity status. Life became a standard by which the public judged photography, and many of today's photo books celebrate "photojournalism" as if it had been the exclusive province of near-celebrity magazine photographers.

In 1947, a few famous photographers founded the international photographic cooperative Magnum Photos. In 1989, Corbis Corporation and in 1995 Getty Images were founded. These powerful image libraries sell the rights to photographs and other still images.

=== Decline ===
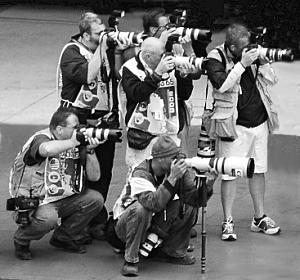
Sports photojournalists at Indianapolis Motor Speedway

The Golden Age of Photojournalism ended in the 1970s when many photo-magazines ceased publication, most prominently, Life, which ended weekly publication in December 1972. They found that they could not compete with other media for advertising revenue to sustain their large circulations and high costs. Still, those magazines taught journalism much about the photographic essay and the power of still images.

However, since the late 1970s, photojournalism and documentary photography have increasingly been accorded a place in art galleries alongside fine art photography. Luc Delahaye, Manuel Rivera-Ortiz, and the members of VII Photo Agency are among many who regularly exhibit in galleries and museums.

== Professional organizations ==
The Danish Union of Press Photographers (Pressefotografforbundet) was the first national organization for newspaper photographers in the world. It was founded in 1912 in Copenhagen, Denmark, by six press photographers. Today it has over 800 members.

The National Press Photographers Association (NPPA) was founded in 1946 in the U.S., and has about 10,000 members. Others around the world include the British Press Photographers Association (BPPA) founded in 1984, then relaunched in 2003, and now has around 450 members. Hong Kong Press Photographers Association (1989), Northern Ireland Press Photographers Association (2000), Pressfotografernas Klubb (Sweden, 1930), and PK — Pressefotografenes Klubb (Norway).

Magnum Photos was founded in 1947 by Robert Capa, David "Chim" Seymour, Henri Cartier-Bresson, George Rodger, William Vandivert, Rita Vandivert, and Maria Eisner, being one of the first photographic cooperatives, owned and administered entirely by its members worldwide.

VII Photo Agency was founded in September 2001, and got its name from the original seven founders, Alexandra Boulat, Ron Haviv, Gary Knight, Antonin Kratochvil, Christopher Morris, James Nachtwey, and John Stanmeyer. Today it has 30 members, along with a mentor program.

News organizations and journalism schools run many different awards for photojournalists. Since 1968, Pulitzer Prizes have been awarded for the following categories of photojournalism: 'Feature Photography' and 'Spot News Photography'. Other awards are 'World Press Photo', 'Best of Photojournalism', and 'Pictures of the Year', as well as the UK-based 'The Press Photographer's Year'.

== Ethical, legal, and social considerations ==
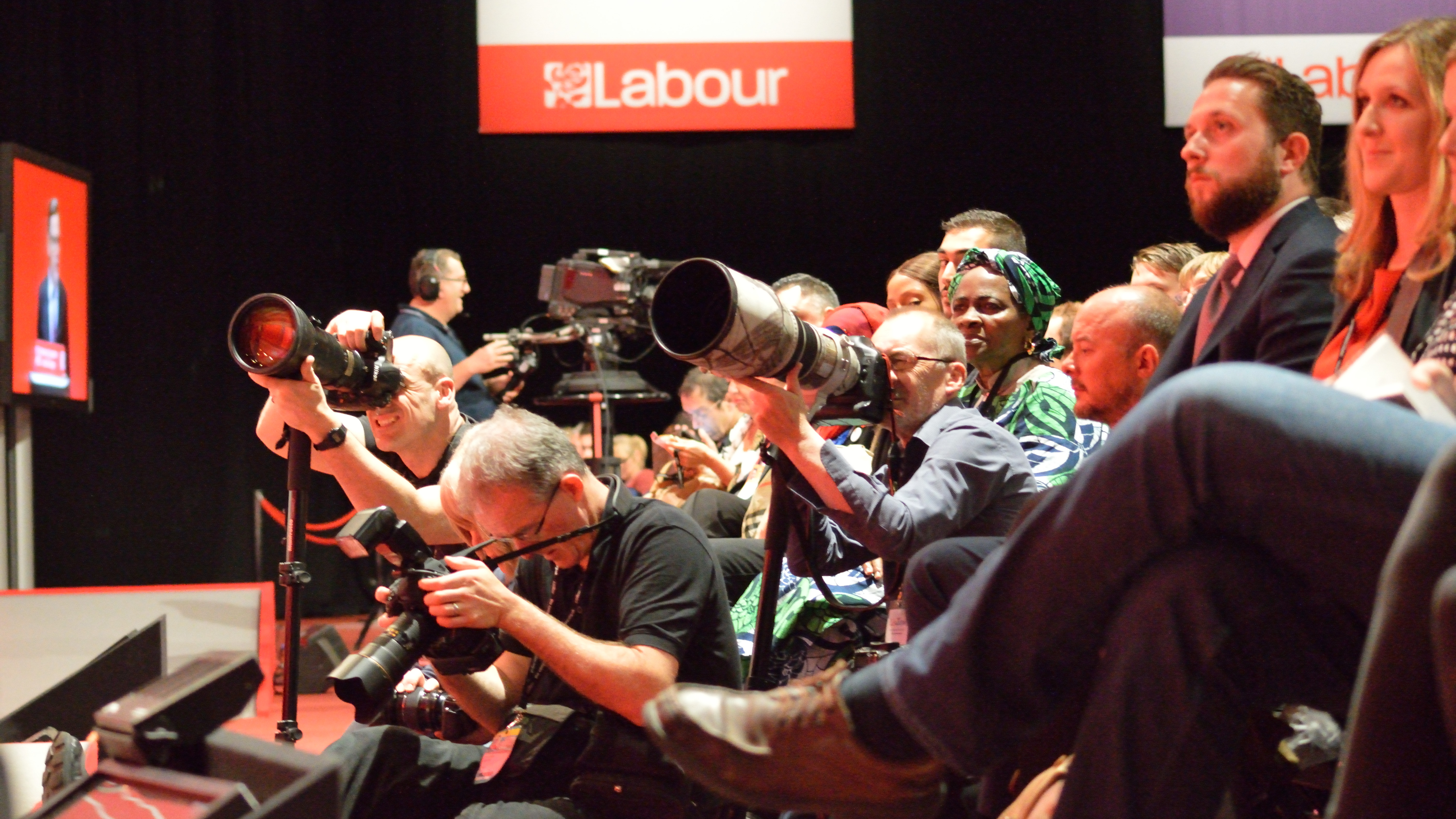
Photojournalists at the 2016 Labour Party Conference in Liverpool

Photojournalism works within the same ethical approaches to objectivity that are applied by other journalists. What to photograph, what to include in the frame, how to curate, and how to edit are constant considerations. Photographing news for an assignment or to illustrate a story can present many possible ethical problems. Photojournalists have a moral responsibility to decide what pictures to take, what picture to stage, and what pictures to show the public. For example, photographs of violence and tragedy are prevalent in US journalism because, as an understated rule of thumb, "if it bleeds, it leads". The public may be attracted to the spectacle of gruesome photographs and dramatic stories. Controversy may arise when deciding which photographs are too violent to show the public.

Photographs of the dead or injured arouse controversy because, more often than not, the name of the person depicted in the photograph is not given in the caption. The photograph of the street execution of a Viet Cong soldier during the Vietnam War provoked a lot of interest because it captured the exact moment of death. The victim's wife learned about her husband's death when she was given a newspaper with the photo on the front page. This photo has claimed a reputation of "galvanizing the anti-war movement in the United States" and impacted many people's perception of the war. Being exposed to such violence can have physiological and psychological effects on those who document it and is but one of many different forms of emotional labor that photojournalists report experiencing. In this case, the photographer Eddie Adams was quoted saying "I was getting money for showing one man killing another. Two lives were destroyed, and I was getting paid for it. I was a hero." He expressed how this photo haunted him due to its impact on the world.

A key example of how impactful photography can be is found during documentation of the US Civil rights movement. Bill Hudson was in Birmingham, Alabama, on a quest to document the peaceful protests of the movement when he took a photo of high school student Walter Gadsden. In this photograph Gadsden appeared to be attacked by a police dog and the resulting image brought the gory side of the movement to everyone's attention. The photo was seen above the fold in the May 1963 The New York Times. In the case of this particular photograph, it helped change the path of the civil rights movement and gained it even more attention.

Other issues involving photojournalism include the right to privacy, negotiating how the subject desires to be depicted, and questions of whether compensation is warranted. Especially regarding pictures of violence, photojournalists face the ethical dilemma of whether or not to publish images of the victims. The victim's right to privacy is sometimes not addressed or the picture is printed without their knowledge or consent.

Another major issue of photojournalism is photo manipulation – what degree is acceptable? Some pictures are simply manipulated for color enhancement, whereas others are manipulated to the extent where people are edited in or out of the picture. War photography has always been a genre of photojournalism that is frequently staged. Due to the bulkiness and types of cameras present during past wars in history, it was rare when a photograph could capture a spontaneous news event. Subjects were carefully composed and staged in order to capture better images. Another ethical issue is false or misleading captioning. The 2006 Lebanon War photographs controversies is a notable example of some of these issue, and see photo manipulation: use in journalism for other examples.

The emergence of digital photography offers new realms of opportunity for the manipulation, reproduction, and transmission of images. It has inevitably complicated many of the ethical issues involved.

Often, ethical conflicts can be mitigated or enhanced by the actions of a sub-editor or picture editor, who takes control of the images once they have been delivered to the news organization. The photojournalist often has no control as to how images are ultimately used.

The National Press Photographers Association (NPPA) is a professional society in the US that emphasizes photojournalism. Members of the NPPA accept the following code of ethics;

1. The practice of photojournalism, both as a science and art, is worthy of the very best thought and effort of those who enter into it as a profession.
2. Photojournalism affords an opportunity to serve the public that is equaled by few other vocations and all members of the profession should strive by example and influence to maintain high standards of ethical conduct free of mercenary considerations of any kind.
3. It is the individual responsibility of every photojournalist at all times to strive for pictures that report truthfully, honestly and objectively.
4. Business promotion in its many forms is essential, but untrue statements of any nature are not worthy of a professional photojournalist and we severely condemn any such practice.
5. It is our duty to encourage and assist all members of our profession, individually and collectively, so that the quality of photojournalism may constantly be raised to higher standards.
6. It is the duty of every photojournalist to work to preserve all freedom-of-the-press rights recognized by law and to work to protect and expand freedom-of-access to all sources of news and visual information.
7. Our standards of business dealings, ambitions and relations shall have in them a note of sympathy for our common humanity and shall always require us to take into consideration our highest duties as members of society. In every situation in our business life, in every responsibility that comes before us, our chief thought shall be to fulfill that responsibility and discharge that duty so that when each of us is finished we shall have endeavored to lift the level of human ideals and achievement higher than we found it.
8. No Code of Ethics can prejudge every situation, thus common sense and good judgment are required in applying ethical principles.

=== Unethical practices ===
Most photojournalists consider stage-managed shots presented as candid to be unethical.

Mike Meadows, a veteran photographer of the Los Angeles Times, was covering a major wild fire sweeping southern California on 27 October 1993. His picture of a Los Angeles County firefighter, Mike Alves cooling himself off with water in a pool in Altadena ran both in the Times and nationally. Prior to submitting the photograph for a Pulitzer Prize, Meadows' assignment editor, Fred Sweets, contacted the firefighter, who reportedly said he had been asked by Meadows to go to the pool and splash water on his head. Meadows denied the accusation, claiming "I may have been guilty of saying this would make a nice shot, but to the best of my recollection, I did not directly ask him to do that. ... I've been doing breaking news stories for years and years and I've never in my life set up a picture." Meadows was suspended without pay for a week and picture was withdrawn from any prize competitions – the Times called it a "fabrication" and the paper's photography director, Larry Armstrong, said "when you manipulate the situation, you manipulate the news."

Edward Keating, a Pulitzer Prize winner from The New York Times, photographed a young boy pointing a toy gun outside a Middle Eastern grocery store, near a town where the FBI raided an alleged Al Qaeda cell. Other photographers at the scene claimed that Keating pointed with his own arm to show the boy which way to look and aim the gun. After the Columbia Journalism Review reported the incident, Keating was forced to leave the paper.

== Impact of new technologies ==
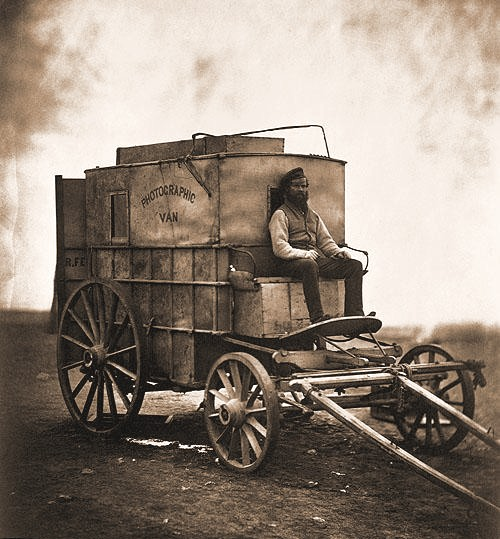
Roger Fenton's Photographic Van, 1855, formerly a wine merchant's wagon; his assistant is pictured at the front.

As early as the Crimean War in the mid-19th century, photographers were using the novel technology of the glass plate camera to record images of British soldiers in the field. As a result, they had to deal with not only war conditions, but their pictures often required long shutter speeds, and they had to prepare each plate before taking the shot and develop it immediately after. This led to, for example, Roger Fenton traveling around in a transportable dark room, which at times made him a target of the enemy. These technological barriers are why he was unable to obtain any direct images of the action.

The use of photography as a way of reporting news did not become widespread until the advent of smaller, more portable cameras that used an enlargeable film negative to record images. The introduction of the 35 mm Leica camera in 1925 made it possible for photographers to move with the action, take multiple shots of events as they were unfolding, as well as be more able to create a narrative through their photographs alone.

Since the 1960s, motor drives, electronic flash, auto-focus, better lenses and other camera enhancements have made picture-taking easier. New digital cameras free photojournalists from the limitation of film roll length. Although the number depends on the amount of megapixels the camera contains, whether one's shooting mode is JPEG or raw, and what size of memory card one is using, it is possible to store thousands of images on a single memory card.

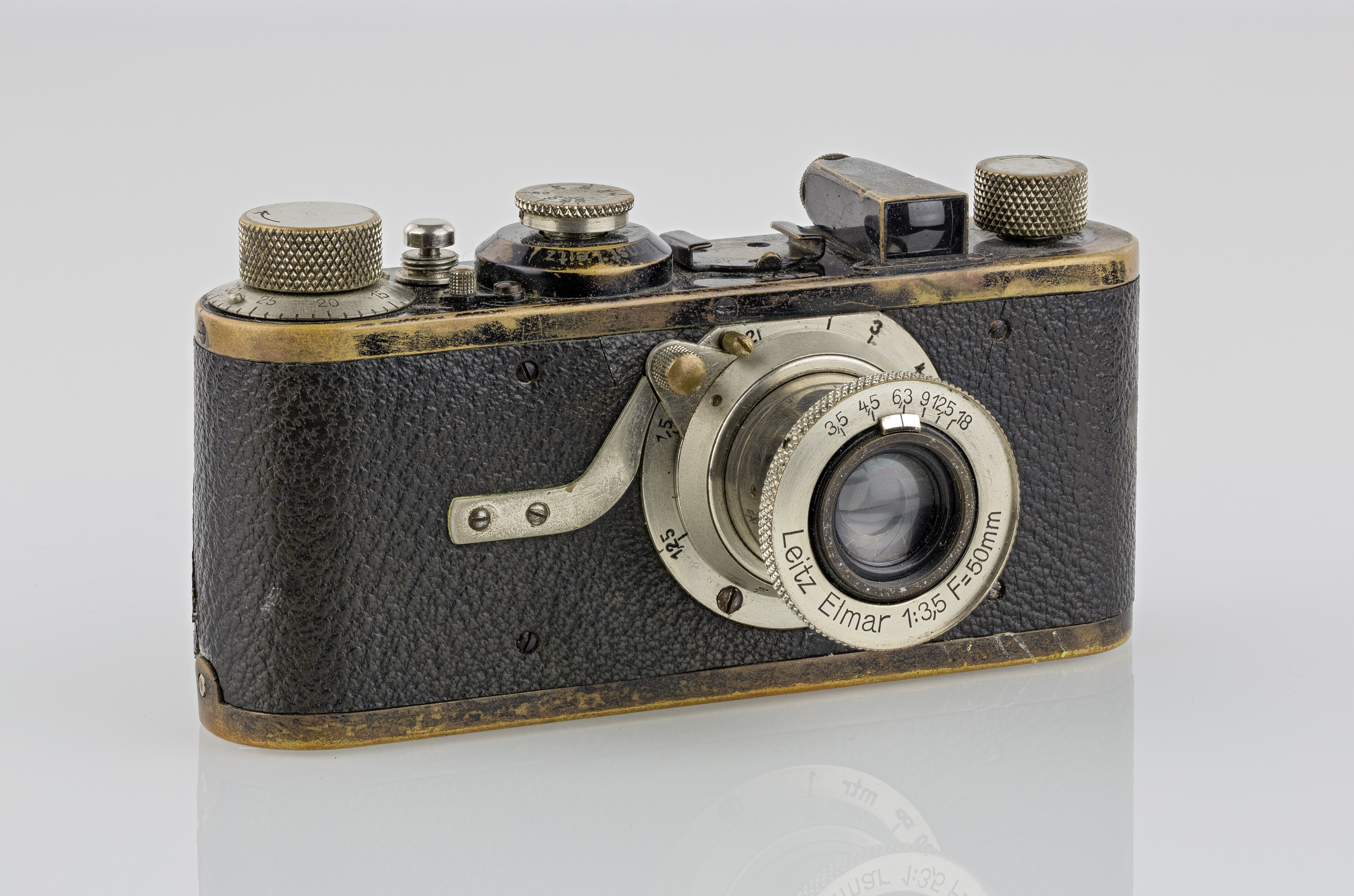
Leica 1 (1925)'s introduction marked the beginning of modern photojournalism.

In the 21st century, digital cameras and mobile phones became central tools of photojournalism, changing how news images were gathered and distributed.

The creation and subsequent popularity of social media has allowed greater numbers of non-professional photographers to contribute to news across the world. Whenever major events occur, there is a high chance that people with camera phones are around to capture photos and post them to various social networks. This more widespread exposure allows the Associated Press and other companies to reach out to citizen journalists who hold ownership of the photos and obtain permission to use those photos in news outlets.

The content of photos tends to outweigh their quality when it comes to news value. On 18 February 2004, The New York Times published on their front page a photo of AT&T CEO John Zeglis, which was taken with a camera phone. Content remains the most important element of photojournalism, but the ability to extend deadlines with rapid gathering and editing of images has brought significant changes. Even by the end of the 1990s – when digital cameras such as the Nikon D1 and the Canon EOS D30 were still in their infancy – nearly 30 minutes were needed to scan and transmit a single color photograph from a remote location to a news office for printing. Now, equipped with a digital camera, a mobile phone and a laptop computer, a photojournalist can send a high-quality image in minutes, even seconds after an event occurs. Camera phones and portable satellite links increasingly allow for the mobile transmission of images from almost any point on the earth.

There is some concern by news photographers that the profession of photojournalism as it is known today could change to such a degree that it is unrecognizable as image-capturing technology naturally progresses. Staff photojournalism jobs continued to dwindle in the 2010s and some of the largest news media outlets in the US now rely on freelancers for the majority of their needs. For example, in 2016, the New York Times employed 52 photo editors and relied on freelancers to provide 50% or more of its visuals; The Wall Street Journal employed 24 photo editors and relied on freelancers for 66% of its features imagery and 33% of its news imagery; The Washington Post employed 19 photo editors and relied on freelancers for 80% of its international news imagery, 50% of its political news imagery, and between 60—80% of its national news imagery.

The age of the citizen journalist and the providing of news photos by amateur bystanders have contributed to the art of photojournalism. Paul Levinson attributes this shift to the Kodak camera, one of the first cheap and accessible photo technologies that "put a piece of visual reality into every person's potential grasp." The empowered news audience with the advent of the Internet sparked the creation of blogs, podcasts and online news, independent of the traditional outlets, and "for the first time in our history, the news increasingly is produced by companies outside journalism". Dan Chung, a former photojournalist for The Guardian and Reuters, believes that professional photojournalists will have to adapt to video to make a living. Most digital single lens reflex bodies are being equipped with video capabilities.

=== Phone journalism ===
Phone journalism is a relatively new and even controversial means of photojournalism, which involves the use of pictures taken and edited on phones by professional or non-professional photographers.

In recent years, as social media has become the major platform on which people receive news and share events, phone photography is gaining popularity as the primary tool for online visual communication. A phone is easy to carry and always accessible in a pocket, and the immediacy in taking pictures can reduce the intervention of the scene and subjects to a minimum. With the assistance of abundant applications, photographers can achieve a highly aesthetic way of conveying messages. Once the pictures are uploaded onto social media, photographers can immediately expose their work to a wide range of audiences and receive real-time feedback from them. With a large number of active participants online, the pictures could also be spread out in a short period of time, thus evoking profound influence on society.

Having noticed the advantages of the combination of social media and phoneography, some well-known newspapers, news magazines and professional photojournalists decided to employ phone journalism as a new approach. When the London Bombings happened in July 2005, for the first time, both The New York Times and The Washington Post ran photos on their front pages made by citizen journalists with camera phones. As work of witnesses and survivors, the images were less the outcome of documentary intent than a response to a traumatic shock. These photos represented "vivid, factual accounts of history as it explodes around us", according to Washington Post journalist Robert MacMillan. In another instance, when Hurricane Sandy hit the northeastern United States in 2012, Time sent out five photographers with iPhones to document the devastation. Photographers dived deep into the site and captured pictures in close proximity to the storm and human suffering. One of the shots, raging ocean waves collapsing on Coney Island in Brooklyn, taken by Benjamin Lowy, made the cover of Time's November 12 issue. Then in 2013, the Chicago Sun-Times laid off its entire staff of 28 photographers, including John H. White, a Pulitzer Prize winner in photography. The newspaper cited viewers shifting towards more video as a reason. They then employed freelance photographers and required them to train in how to use an iPhone for photography to fill the gap. Some viewers online were quick to point out an at-times reduction in quality in comparison to the newspaper's previous full-time professionals.

== See also ==
- Associated Press
- History of Spanish photojournalism
- JPG (magazine)
- List of photographs considered the most important
- List of photojournalists
- Magnum Photos
- Paparazzi
- Photo caption
- Reuters
- VII Photo Agency
- ZUMA Press
