= Maine Media College =

Art school in Rockport, Maine

- Former names: Rockport College; International Photographic Workshops; Maine Media Workshops + College
- Established: 1973; 53 years ago
- Founder: David Lyman
- Accreditation: New England Commission of Higher Education
- President: Michael Mansfield
- Location: Rockport, Maine, U.S. 44°11′37″N 69°04′35″W
- Campus: Rural, 15 acres (6.1 ha)
- Website: www.mainemedia.edu

Maine Media College, or simply Maine Media, is a small college located in Rockport, Maine, United States. It was established in 1973 as The Maine Photographic Workshops by David Lyman.

Maine Media is accredited by the New England Commission of Higher Education.

== History ==
The Maine Photographic Workshops were founded by photographer David Lyman in 1973, who chose to hold the first workshops in Rockport because it was "practically a ghost town." The workshops were joined by the institution's first degree, an Associate of Arts, and in 1995 it began offering the Master of Fine Arts.

Lyman owned the workshops and degree program, known as Rockport College. In 2006, he announced he would put the entire organization up for sale. A group of faculty and staff began a campaign to acquire the workshops and college as a nonprofit organization. Their campaign was successful, with the new nonprofit Maine Media Workshops taking over in 2007. The school was subsequently renamed Maine Media College. The two distinct programs (the workshops and the certificate- and degree-granting college) operated as Maine Media Workshops + College until 2023, when they were shortened to Maine Media.

== Academics ==
Since its inception, Maine Media has been known for its workshops, which range from one week to twelve weeks long. In addition to workshops, Maine Media offers two certificates and one graduate degree: the Certificate in Collaborative Filmmaking, the Professional Certificate in Visual Storytelling, and the Master of Fine Arts in Media Arts.

== Campus ==
The Maine Media Workshops were originally held at Union Hall in Rockport in 1973 and moved to a small campus less than a mile from Rockport Harbor in 1979. That campus became the campus of Maine Media College. The college's campus was significantly expanded after a 2015 donation of 14 acres of land valued at more than $1 million, which linked the campus to U.S. Route 1.

The campus includes several student residences, studio spaces, and production facilities.

=== Housing ===
Student residences are located throughout Rockport and include dorms, student rooms in campus homes. Students may choose to reside off-campus. There are accommodations on-campus for around 100 students in a combination of singles or doubles.

== Notable alumni and faculty ==
- Amy Arbus, photographer
- Wayne Beach, director of Slow Burn
- Richard Blanco, poet
- Alice Brooks, cinematographer
- Russell Carpenter, cinematographer
- Keith Carter, photographer
- Chuck Carter, video game and film artist
- Jill Enfield, photographer
- Gregory Heisler, photographer
- Henry Horenstein, photographer
- Alejandro González Iñárritu, filmmaker
- John Leguizamo, actor and producer
- Michelle MacLaren, director and producer
- Jay Maisel, photographer
- Andrea Modica, photographer
- Karen Moncrieff, actress, director, and screenwriter
- Alan Myerson, television and film director
- Laura Poitras, documentary filmmaker
- Rodrigo Prieto, cinematographer
- Neil Selkirk, photographer
- Joyce Tenneson, photographer
- George A. Tice, photographer
- Peter Turnley, photographer
- Vincent Versace, photographer

== See also ==
- Maine Media Workshops
