= Maine Media Workshops =

Maine Media
- Former names: Maine Media Workshops + College
- Established: 1973
- Accreditation: New England Commission of Higher Education
- President: Michael P. Mansfield
- Provost: Elizabeth Greenberg
- Location: 70 Camden St., Rockport, Maine 04856, US
- Campus: Rural, 20 acres
- Nickname: Maine Media
- Website: www.mainemedia.edu

The Maine Media Workshops (formerly the Maine Photographic Workshops) in Rockport, Maine is an international non-profit educational organization offering year-round workshops for photographers, filmmakers, and media artists. The workshops are organized through Maine Media College.

Alumni of the filmmaking workshops include Alejandro González Iñárritu, Laura Poitras, Rodrigo Prieto, Michelle MacLaren, and John Leguizamo.

== Faculty includes ==
- Sam Abell
- Amy Arbus
- Wayne Beach
- Marcus Bleasdale
- Richard Blanco
- Alice Brooks
- Dan Burkholder
- Russell Carpenter, ASC
- Keith Carter
- Chuck Carter
- George DeWolfe
- Jill Enfield
- Steven Fierberg, ASC
- Mo Flam
- Mick Fowler
- John Goodman
- Brenton Hamilton
- Doug Hart
- Cig Harvey
- Ron Haviv
- Gregory Heisler
- Judy Herrmann
- Judith Hole
- Bill Holshevnikoff
- Henry Horenstein
- Ryszard Horowitz
- Doug Jensen
- Brian Kaufman
- R. J. Kern
- Douglas Kirkland
- Mark Kohl
- Antonin Kratochvil
- Bob Krist
- Bobbi Lane
- Susan Lipper
- Jay Maisel
- Constantine Manos
- Taylor Mali
- Daniel Marracino
- Norman Mauskopf
- Jack McDonald
- Bill Megalos
- Rexford Metz
- Andrea Modica
- Karen Moncrieff
- Alan Myerson
- Richard Newman
- Alessandro Pavone
- Derek Poore
- David Petrarca
- Michael Pressman
- Barry Primus
- Kate Raisz
- Mark Raker
- Janet Roach
- Louise Rosen
- Jan Rosenbaum
- Grant Rosenberg
- Bob Sacha
- DeWitt Sage
- Stephen Sheppard
- Sandy Smolan
- John Stanmeyer
- Craig Stevens
- Jon Weiman
- Paul Taylor
- Joyce Tenneson
- George Tice
- Peter Turnley
- Mark Ulano
- Vincent Versace
- Peter Werner
- Steve Wright

== See also ==
- Maine Media College
- Missouri Photo Workshop
