= List of United States presidential inaugural poems =

United States presidential inaugural poems are poems recited as part of a presidential inauguration ceremony in the United States. Since 1961, six poets have delivered poems during the official inauguration ceremonies of four presidents.

== List ==
Year	President inaugurated	Poet	Poem	Notes
1961	John F. Kennedy	Robert Frost	"The Gift Outright"	The first poet to speak at an inauguration of a president. Frost attempted to read "Dedication" (later retitled "For John F. Kennedy His Inauguration"), written for the inauguration, but the glare from the sun made the text difficult to see. He instead recited "The Gift Outright" from memory.
1993	Bill Clinton	Maya Angelou	"On the Pulse of Morning"	Angelou became the first woman and the first African American poet to recite a poem at a presidential inauguration.
1997	Bill Clinton	Miller Williams	"Of History and Hope"	
2009	Barack Obama	Elizabeth Alexander	"Praise Song for the Day"	
2013	Barack Obama	Richard Blanco	"One Today"	
2021	Joe Biden	Amanda Gorman	"The Hill We Climb"	At age 22, Gorman became the youngest poet to recite a poem at a presidential inauguration.
