= One Today =

Poem written by Richard Blanco

"One Today" is a poem by Richard Blanco first recited at the second inauguration of Barack Obama, making Blanco the fifth poet to read during a United States presidential inauguration. "One Today" was called "a fine example of public poetry, in keeping with Blanco’s other work: Loose, open lines of mostly conversational verse, a flexible iambic pentameter stanza form," by Ken Tucker in Entertainment Weekly.

== Background ==
Richard Blanco was asked to write three poems for the selection of the one to be read at the second inauguration of Barack Obama re-elected on his second term on November 6, 2012. "One Today" was chosen among "What We Know of Country" and "Mother Country". The poet said: "I wanted all three to be different facets of my writing, and my experiences, and how we can live in our country and be part of the union"

== Analysis ==
"The images in the poem move from the universal to the specific, so that from out of the millions of nameless, faceless Americans one figure in particular emerges: the immigrant. This is where “One Today” does something very interesting: it shows us the exact point at which the story of the immigrant experience intersects with the myth of the American Dream."

"Over the course of its nine stanzas (69 lines), “One Today” offers a sweeping view of America during a single day, from sunrise to sunset. The first stanza links geographically diverse areas of the country through the image of the rising sun:"

The incipit is strongly alliterative. Almost each word recalls the following by assonance . A sort of raffinate anagrammatic playing, highlights "us" which is contained in the word "sun" and "rose" which is contained in "shores". The anaphoric "One" of the first and fifth line, emphasizes the diurnal light growing in intensity. The poem is characterised by a musical harmony given by the employment of figures of sound such as alliteration, assonance, paromoiosis, and several onomatopoeic words such as "slide", "whistling", "brush". The style is mostly nominal and where the lyrical discourse proceeds for asyndeton the speed of the rhythm creates breathtaking poetic-narrative sequences.

On the other hand the employment of prepositions, deixis, particularly spatial deixis, makes images plastic and visual.

== See also ==
- List of United States presidential inaugural poems
- Poems at United States presidential inaugurations
