= Occasional poetry =

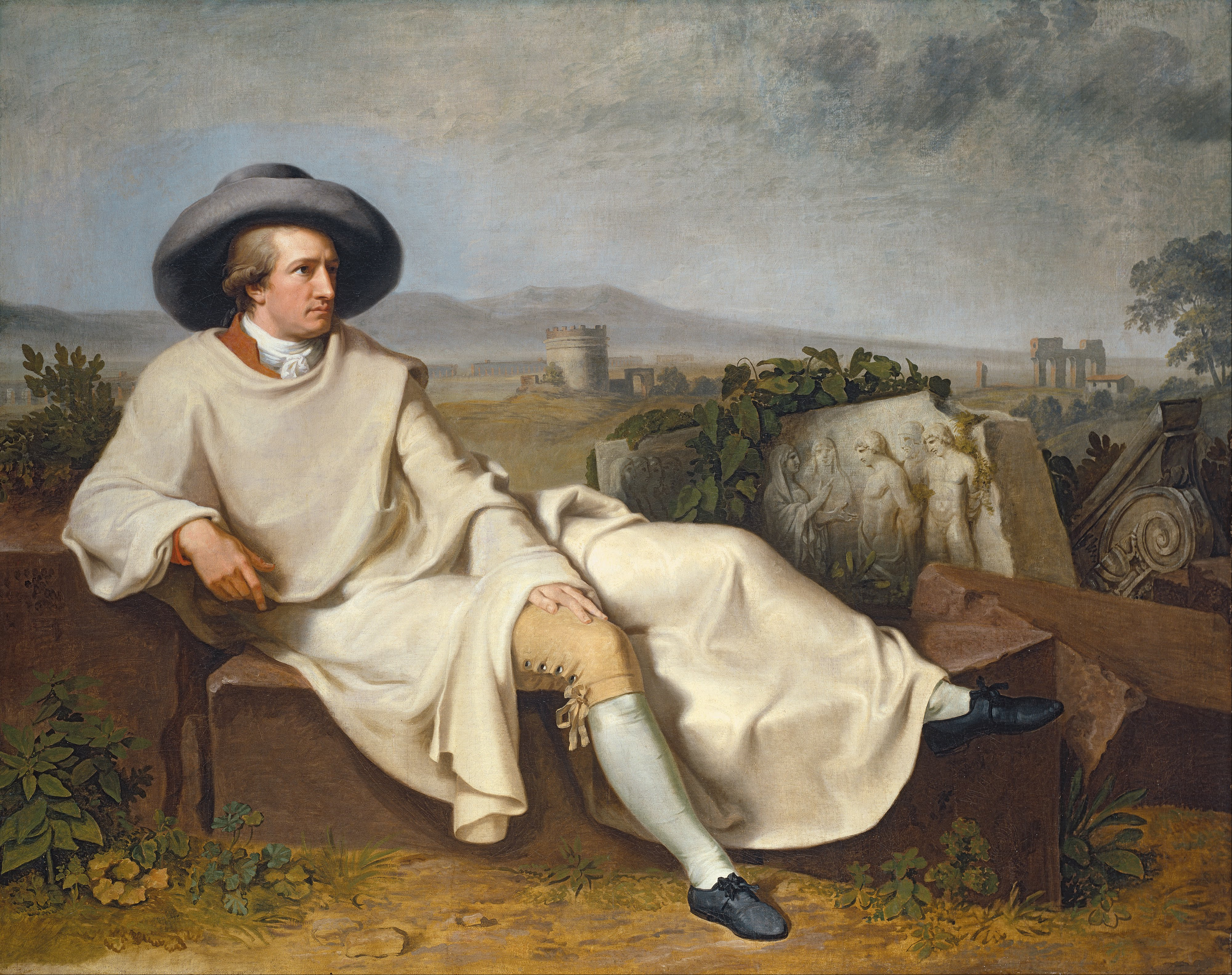
Goethe said that "Occasional Poetry is the highest kind" (Goethe in the Roman Campagna, 1786)

1669 occasional sonnet printed in Urbino

Occasional poetry is poetry composed for a particular occasion. In the history of literature, it is often studied in connection with orality, performance, and patronage.

== Term ==
As a term of literary criticism, "occasional poetry" describes the work's purpose and the poet's relation to subject matter. It is not a genre, but several genres originate as occasional poetry, including epithalamia (wedding songs), dirges or funerary poems, paeans, and victory odes. Occasional poems may also be composed exclusive of or within any given set of genre conventions to commemorate single events or anniversaries, such as birthdays, foundings, or dedications.

Occasional poetry is often lyric because it originates as performance, in antiquity and into the 16th century even with musical accompaniment; at the same time, because performance implies an audience, its communal or public nature can place it in contrast with the intimacy or personal expression of emotion often associated with the term "lyric".

Occasional poetry was a significant and even characteristic form of expression in ancient Greek and Roman culture, and has continued to play a prominent if sometimes aesthetically debased role throughout Western literature. Poets whose body of work features occasional poetry that stands among their highest literary achievements include Pindar, Horace, Ronsard, Jonson, Dryden, Milton, Goethe, Yeats, and Mallarmé. The occasional poem (French pièce d'occasion, German Gelegenheitsgedichte) is also important in Persian, Arabic, Chinese, and Japanese literature, and its ubiquity among virtually all world literatures suggests the centrality of occasional poetry in the origin and development of poetry as an art form.

Goethe declared that "Occasional Poetry is the highest kind," and Hegel gave it a central place in the philosophical examination of how poetry interacts with life:

Poetry's living connection with the real world and its occurrences in public and private affairs is revealed most amply in the so-called pièces d'occasion. If this description were given a wider sense, we could use it as a name for nearly all poetic works: but if we take it in the proper and narrower sense we have to restrict it to productions owing their origin to some single present event and expressly devoted to its exaltation, embellishment, commemoration, etc. But by such entanglement with life poetry seems again to fall into a position of dependence, and for this reason it has often been proposed to assign the whole sphere of pièces d'occasion an inferior value although to some extent, especially in lyric poetry, the most famous works belong to this class."

A high-profile example of a 21st-century occasional poem is Elizabeth Alexander's "Praise Song for the Day," written for Barack Obama's 2009 US presidential inauguration, and read by the poet during the event to a television audience of around 38 million.

== See also ==
- Poetry
- Gebrauchsmusik
- Haiku

== Selected bibliography ==
- Sugano, Marian Zwerling. The Poetics of the Occasion: Mallarmé and the Poetry of Circumstance. Stanford University Press, 1992. Limited preview online.
