= Alessandro Pavone =

Italian cinematographer and video-journalist

Alessandro Pavone is an Italian videographer of documentary film and television. He has worked as a cinematographer or producer of a number of documentary programs including Vice, Frontline and Hunting ISIS, as well as producing work for BBC2 and Al Jazeera.

== Early life and education ==
Alessandro Pavone was born in Taranto, Italy.

== Career ==
As a freelancer at independent production companies in London, Pavone produced BBC2’s Shroud of Turin: Material Evidence. The documentary was produced for Easter in 2008 for the twentieth anniversary of the 1988 radiocarbon dating of the Shroud of Turin.

From 2011 to 2015, Pavone was based in Kabul and Istanbul while covering the wars in Afghanistan, in Iraq, and Western African Ebola virus epidemic.

In 2019, Pavone was the cinematographer of The Forgotten Heroes of Empire, an Al Jazeera documentary about Kenyans that served in the Second World War but were neglected as veterans of the British Army.

== Filmography ==
Year	Title	Role(s)	Ref(s).			
Year	Title	Role(s)	Ref(s).	2008	Shroud of Turin Material Evidence	Producer
2013	The Longest Kiss					Producer
2018	Hunting ISIS					
2015–2023	Vice	Cinematographer				
2019	The Forgotten Heroes of Empire	Cinematographer				
2020	Frontline	Local producer				
2022	The Thief, His Wife and the Canoe: The Real Story	Cinematographer				
2022	Secrets and Deals	Cinematographer				
2022	Life in the Taliban's Afghanistan	Cinematographer				
