= Praise Song for the Day =

2009 poem by Elizabeth Alexander

"Praise Song for the Day" is an occasional poem written by the American poet Elizabeth Alexander and delivered at the 2009 presidential inauguration of President Barack Obama. The poem is the fourth to be delivered at a United States presidential inauguration, following in the tradition of recitals by Robert Frost (John F. Kennedy, 1961), Maya Angelou (Bill Clinton, 1993), and Miller Williams (Bill Clinton, 1997).

It consists of fourteen unrhymed three-line stanzas (tercets) and a one-line coda. Delivered directly after Obama's inaugural address, it received an indifferent response and was criticized as "too prosaic". Graywolf Press published the poem in paperback on February 6, 2009, with a first printing of 100,000 copies.

Adam Kirsch called the poem "bureaucratic verse".

== See also ==
- List of United States presidential inaugural poems
- Poems at United States presidential inaugurations
