= The Prince of Los Cocuyos =

2014 memoir by Richard Blanco

- Paperback book cover
- Author: Richard Blanco
- Language: English & Spanish
- Genre: Memoir
- Published: September 2014
- Publisher: HarperCollins
- Publication place: United States
- ISBN: 978-0-06-242749-6

The Prince of Los Cocuyos is a memoir of Richard Blanco's childhood. The story takes place in Westchester, Miami during the late 1970s and '80s. Blanco is known for being the first Hispanic and openly gay poet of the United States. This book follows his early life as he faced cultural and identity differences within his own family and the hardships of coming of age. In the memoir, he substitutes the real names of his family and friends to tell his story. For example, "Caco" is Richard's older brother Carlos.

== Plot ==
Riqui's family immigrated from Cuba during the early 1970s, escaping Fidel Castro's takeover. He opens up the memoir by detailing his family's journey to Miami. His grandmother paid for his whole family to travel to go from Cuba then Spain, then New York, then finally Miami. When Riqui's family finally settled in Güecheste, Miami they went to work at a bodega, a store owned by his uncle. Riqui's family held tight to their Cuban Heritage and only ate Cuban food. However, Riqui had a hard time accepting this as he wanted to eat American food like Pop-Tarts and Cool Whip. His grandmother, Abuela, would frequently disapprove because real food was Cuban food to her. Abuela did not want to shop at Winn-Dixie out of fear of the American language barrier. Riqui insisted and finally his grandmother gave him money to shop at Winn-Dixie. She later started enjoying American products and offered to cook Riqui a traditional American Thanksgiving dinner, she referred to as San Giving. However, his extended family decided to bring and merge the Cuban food with the American food, which frustrated Riqui. Towards the end of Thanksgiving Riqui connects pilgrims to his family and how their journeys to America are similar.

Riquis family continued to strengthen their ties to Cuba. His grandfather, Abuelo, wanting to hold unto this life from Cuba created an animal farm in his backyard. This consisted of a Chickens, a rooster, some bunnies and a dog. This however, was not allowed and Animal Control made Abuelo get rid of his animals. Riqui was devastated when his Abuela killed all the chickens and served it for dinner. Things get even worse when Riqui purchases a rug-making kit, that he had been saving up for, and his Abuela takes it away from him and warned him about seeming like un maricón. She then later helps the family go to Disney World by paying for everyone's ticket.

The trip to Disney World, in his fathers Chevy Malibu, came with challenges for the whole family. The boys had to endure their parents Spanish songs on the radio, and Riqui had to poop on the side of the highway while getting photographed by his Mother. Due to the language barrier Riqui's older brother, Caco, had to be the interpreter on the trip so his family could communicate. Caco had to not only help his father at the service plaza, but also when he gets pulled over for speeding, that led to the brother feeling embarrassed. Once the family arrives to Disney, Riqui is excited for Cinderellas castle and El Ratoncito Miguel, Mickey Mouse. However, Riqui was disappointed when he couldn't go into Cinderellas castle since he wanted to play dress-up. He ends up buying a Mickey Mouse doll and melting his crayons in the back of his dads precious car.

Riquis family goes on vacation in Miami to Copa Hotel. There he meets Yetta Epstein who shares about her life. Riqui gets left behind by his older cousins and brother. When Yetta invited Riqui to keep her company he accepts. They later talk about Yetta past as a Jewish woman and how she is from more than one place. She likes coming from many places and shows Riqui that he should feel good about his Cuban background. Riqui learns about the old Miami from Yetta and he shares about the Cuba his parents always talk about it. Riqui and Yetta bid their farewells towards the end of Riqui's vacation. As Riqui starts getting older he gains weight and his Abuela helps him find a job at their families Bodega, El Cocuyito. He later is forced to take out the cashiers daughter to her Quinces by his Abuela in an attempt to make him Un Hombre, a man. Riqui does that to make his Abuela happy, but he was not attracted to his girl or any girl yet.

During high school, Riqui's best friend Julio makes him ask out Anita. Riqui takes her out even though he felt no romantic feelings towards her. He later takes her to the dance where he kisses her, but when he still feels nothing he realized he was different than the other boys.

At El Cocuyito, Riqui is getting stronger and gaining more responsibility. When a middle aged man named Victor starts working there, Riqui becomes intrigued with him. Victor was an artist and he tells Riqui about his past in Cuba. He tells him that he was jailed for loving another man so he fled Cuba. As the two grow closer to each other, Riqui starts becoming attracted to Victor. On Victors birthday, Riqui goes to his house, but things take a turn when Victor made a sexual move towards him and Riqui resisted. Riqui came to terms that he was a gay man and Victor told him he needed to accept himself in order to be ready.

As the book is coming to end, the family is preparing for their weekly picnic at El Farito. The family also invited extended family for the barbecue his mom was preparing. Ariel was a family friend about Riqui's age. He brought a pig for Riqui's mom to roast and shared memories about Cuba with Riqui and his family. It seemed to bug Riqui how much Ariel knew about Cuba and how easily he connected with his Cuban heritage. However, Ariel talks to Riqui and tells him to visit Cuba and stay connected. After the party Ariel and Riqui never meet again. As the memoir comes to an end, Riqui talked about the death's in his family and a touching visit to Cuba with his mother.

== Main characters ==
- Riqui: Riqui is Richard Blanco in this memoir, he is the protagonist and narrator of the book. Riqui was a young boy who grows up a little chubby. He had a difficult relationship with his grandmother due to differing opinions, but considered her his best friend. Riqui loved American culture and, at times, distanced himself from the traditions of his Cuban family. Growing up Riqui realized that he was different from most of his friends. Instead he kept to himself and was attracted more to the arts and books. When he finished high school, Riqui understood more of his attraction to other men and felt closer to his Cuban roots.
- Abuela: Riquis grandmother came from Cuba and acted like she still lived there. She brought Riqui's family from Cuba and lives with them during the time of Memoir. She is described as a strong character who always speaks her mind and a penny-pincher. She was often suspicious, watching him closely and often pushed him to become the man that was expected. Abuela feared that Riqui would not become un hombre, a man.
- Abuelo: This is Riqui's grandfather. He is described to have strong ties to Cuba. He started a little farm in their backyard by sneaking animals in. Riqui would often help him tend to the animals. One day, Animal Control demanded he to get rid of all his animals. This causes Abuelo to become furious because he cared for his animals and thought America was a place of freedom.
- Mamá: Riqui's mom is a strong character as well in the book. She was also very connected to her Cuban roots. She cooked and helped around the house a lot. She struggled with the language barrier and the huge changes involved in coming to America. She tried her best to maintain the closeness of her family. Riqui's mom grew tired of always making the food and paying for everything and she made Riqui's Abuela start helping out around the house.
- Papá: Riqui's dad found it hard to adapt in America. He faced challenges as well, like the language barrier. He was humiliated when he is at a gas station and was unable to say "windshield washer" and instead repeated "winchil wacher". His two sons were often embarrassed by their parents and their difficulty learning English.
- Caco: This is Riqui's older brother. He was a high-spirited young boy who tended to be Riqui's babysitter and ally. Caco and Riqui often fought, but they bonded over the shared embarrassment they felt regarding their parents. This was evident when Caco became the family interpreter during the family trip to Disney.

=== Secondary characters ===
- Yetta: An elderly Jewish lady that Riqui met while on vacation at the Copa Hotel. Riqui's older cousins fled, and thus Riqui decided to keep her company when Yetta extended an invitation. Yetta shared that she loved that she was not just from just one place, but from everywhere. She also talked about the old Miami while Riqui shared about the Cuba of his parents. Riqui and Yetta were able to bond over their stories.
- Victor: A middle-aged man Riqui developed an interest in. Victor was a Cuban who went to prison for being openly gay. Riqui found himself attracted and interested in Victor, but did not quite know why. However, this does not turn into a real relationship and they both go their own way.
- Julio: Riqui's best friend in high school. Julio was a little bit of a troublemaker and very outgoing. He encouraged Riqui to get Anita's number. Even though Riqui did not feel any attraction to her, he reluctantly agreed. Through this endeavor, Riqui realized he did not have feelings for Anita. Julio later died in a car accident, which broke Riqui's heart.
- Ariel: A family friend from Cuba who joined Riqui's family towards the end of the book for a barbecue. Ariel talked about his memories in Cuba and all of the distant relatives and their stories. Ariel helped Riqui connect to the lives of people in Cuba and told him to visit his family.

== Themes ==
- Growing up: Riqui's path to becoming self-aware of who he is and being accepted by his family and friends. Growing up encompass a wide range of milestones including new responsibilities and hardships. At the beginning of the book, the reader see how hard it was for Riqui to be himself and live with his grandmother's expectations. He grew up as chubby kid and his grandmother put him to work in the hopes of becoming the man she expected him to be. He was constantly criticized by his grandmother and this made it hard for him to grow up. This book is a coming out for Riqui who later figured out his attraction for other men for the first time and how he handled that.
- Connection to heritage: The strong ties this family has to Cuba and their struggle to adapt in America is evident. They have grounded their identity within their Cuban heritage, but Riqui struggled to figure out where he fit in, not quite Cuban and not quite American. Towards the end, Riqui's connection to his Cuban heritage strengthened. As he got older, he was able to merge these two identities into one.
- Family: This Latino family is very close. Their closeness and strong bond is what constantly spurred fights and arguments. However, there is a sense of accountability and loyalty within this family. From the beginning, there was a clear difference between Riqui and his family. He was a young boy wanting to celebrate a traditional Thanksgiving the American way, but was later disappointed when his family combined Cuban and American food. There were also times when they seemed like a normal family, when they went to Disney World for the first time. Riqui and his older brother tried to hide the embarrassment they felt regarding their parents.

== Awards ==
- 2015: Lambda Literary Award for Gay Memoir
- 2015: Maine Literary Award for Memoir
