= Cig Harvey =

British photographer

- Born: 1973 (age 52–53); Devon, England
- Known for: Photography
- Website: www.cigharvey.com

Cig Harvey (born 1973) is a British fine art photographer known for her surreal images of nature and family. Her work has been compared to René Magritte and has been described as revealing "the mysticism in the mundane." Harvey's work has been exhibited internationally and is included in the collections of The Museum of Fine Arts, Houston and Farnsworth Art Museum.

Harvey lives and works in Rockport, Maine.

== Early life ==
Cig Harvey grew up in the county of Devon in South West England. She became interested in photography at early age because of the photo portfolios that The Independent published in their Sunday editions. At age thirteen, Harvey began working in a darkroom, which furthered her interest in photography. She received her MFA from Maine Media College and in 2005 was selected as one of Photo District News's 30 emerging photographers to watch.

== Career ==
Harvey began her career as an assistant professor at the Art Institute of Boston at Lesley University where she worked for ten years. Her first solo museum show was held at the Stenersen Museum in Oslo in 2012 in conjunction with the release of her first monograph, You Look At Me Like An Emergency (Schilt Publishing, 2012).

In an interview with The Telegraph about her second monograph, Gardening at Night (Schilt Publishing, 2015), Harvey cited magical realism as a source of inspiration and said "I am very interested in finding magic in the real world and photography reminds me that this world is amazing."

Harvey's third monograph, You an Orchestra You a Bomb (Schilt Publishing, 2017) was inspired in part by her near-death experience in a car accident. She began to shoot in a more documentary style after the accident, which Harvey explains as being inspired by the " [...] idea of the gasp and awe. We gasp when something is beautiful, and we gasp when something is terrible. I'm searching for that push/pull in each image." The New York Times review described this series as "carefully recreating that sense of childhood wonder, mixing saturated colors with verdant symbols and engaging text, allowing viewers to contemplate that sense of the unknown, but from a place of joy rather than anxiety."

Her recent work has expanded her focus on familial relationships to her own experience with motherhood and her relationship with her daughter. She was featured in The New York Times in an article titled "Why Can't Great Artists Be Mothers?" rejecting the stereotype that motherhood and artistic dedication are at odds.

In 2017, Harvey was awarded the "Excellence in Teaching Award" from CENTER and in 2018 she was named the 2018 Prix Virginia Laureate, an international photography prize awarded to one woman each year.

Harvey was among the five photographers chosen to be included in Return to Cuba: In the Footsteps of Walker Evans (2016), a feature-length documentary retracing the footsteps of photographer Walker Evans.

In 2020, Harvey was selected by The New York Times to participate in Still Lives, a project documenting thirteen photographers' responses to the COVID-19 pandemic.

== Exhibitions ==
=== Solo exhibitions ===
- 2001: Tread Softly, Paul Mellon Arts Center, Choate Rosemary Hall, Wallingford, Connecticut.
- 2002: Tread Softly, Center for Maine Contemporary Art, Rockport, Maine.
- 2012: You Look At Me Like An Emergency, Stenersen Museum, Oslo, Norway.
- 2019: Eating Flowers: Sensations of Cig Harvey, Ogunquit Museum of American Art, Ogunquit, Maine.

=== Group exhibitions ===
- 2005: Figuratively Speaking: Cig Harvey and Tom Sale, Texas State University, San Marcos, Texas.
- 2014: The Gender Show, George Eastman Museum, Rochester, New York.
- 2015: Highways & Byways, Center for Maine Contemporary Art, Portland Public Library, Maine.
- 2015: Pairings: Selections from the Bruce Brown Collection, University of Maine Museum of Art, Bangor, Maine.
- 2015: Picturing Maine, Farnsworth Art Museum, Rockland, Maine.
- 2016: The Gender Show, Fundación Canal, Madrid, Spain.
- 2017: Contrasts: Seven Unique Visions in Photography, Cape Cod Museum of Art, Dennis, Massachusetts.
- 2017: On Photography, Johnson State College, Johnson, Vermont.
- 2017: Taylor Wessing Photographic Portrait Prize Exhibition, National Portrait Gallery, London, London.
- 2018: Memory: Mystery, Magic, and Make-believe, University of Texas at Dallas, Dallas, Texas.
- 2018: Retour a la Ligne, Musée de l'Élysée, Lausanne, Switzerland.

== Collections ==
- Bowdoin College, Special Collections, Brunswick, Maine
- Farnsworth Art Museum, Rockland, Maine
- Museum of Fine Arts, Houston, Houston, Texas: 2 prints (as of 19 November 2021)

== Books ==
- Harvey, Cig (2012). You Look At Me Like An Emergency. Schilt. ISBN 9053307710
- Harvey, Cig (2015). Gardening at Night. Schilt. ISBN 9789053308448
- Harvey, Cig (2015). You an Orchestra You a Bomb. Schilt. ISBN 9053308938
- Harvey, Cig (2021). Blue Violet. Monacelli. ISBN 9781580935760

== Awards ==
- 2017: Paris Photo, Karl Lagerfeld Selection, Finalist.
- 2017: Clarence John Laughlin Award, Finalist.
- 2017: Taylor Wessing Photographic Portrait Prize, National Portrait Gallery, London, Finalist.
- 2017: Excellence in Teaching Award, CENTER
- 2018: Prix Virginia, International Photography Prize for Women.
- 2021: Maine in America Award, Farnsworth Art Museum.
