= Paromoiosis =

Parallelism of sound between the words of two clauses approximately equal in size

In rhetoric, paromoiosis is parallelism of sound between the words of two clauses approximately equal in size. The similarity of sound can occur at the beginning of the clauses, at the end (where it is equivalent to homoioteleuton), in the middle or throughout the clauses.

For example: "Open to gifts and open to words."
