= Hunting ISIS =

American television documentary series

- Genre: Documentary; drama; war
- Country of origin: United States
- Original language: English

Production
- Running time: 42 minutes
- Production companies: Delirio Films; Passion Pictures

Hunting ISIS is a documentary television series about Americans fighting the Islamic State of Iraq and the Levant, broadcast by Viceland in 2018.

== See also ==
- List of programs broadcast by Viceland
