= Jill Enfield =

American artist and photographer (born 1954)

- Born: August 8, 1954 (age 72); Miami Beach, Florida, US
- Education: New York University; Visual Studies Workshop
- Known for: Photography
- Spouse: Richard Rabinowitz (1978 - present)
- Children: Eve Enfield Rabinowitz (b. 1990), Sally Enfield Rabinowitz (b. 1994)
- Awards: Golden Light Award for Best Technical Book (Maine Photographic Workshops), 25 Best Websites (Photo District News Magazine)

Jill Enfield (born August 8, 1954, in Miami Beach, Florida) is a photographer and hand coloring artist best known for her work in alternative photographic processes such as Cyanotype and Collodion process. She has taught at The New School (Parsons Division), ICP, and New York University.

== The New Americans ==
One of Enfield's best known projects is The New Americans, a portrait series of contemporary immigrants made using the wet plate collodion process. The project culminated in a 2017 solo exhibition at the Ellis Island National Museum of Immigration that occupied six galleries from May through September 2017. The exhibition included Glasshouse of New Americans, an installation comprising approximately 45 antique windows, each bearing a wet collodion portrait of a contemporary immigrant, assembled into the form of a house. The work references the historical use of collodion photography to document immigrants arriving at Ellis Island in the 19th century. The installation subsequently traveled to other venues including Photoville in Brooklyn.

== Books ==
- Enfield, Jill (2002). Photo-imaging: a complete guide to alternative processes. New York: Amphoto Books. ISBN 0817453997.
- Enfield, Jill (2013). Jill Enfield's Guide to Photographic Alternative Processes.1st Edition. Routledge Books. ISBN 9780415810241.
- Enfield, Jill (2020). Jill Enfield's Guide to Photographic Alternative Processes.2nd Edition. Routledge Books. ISBN 1138229075.
