= Vincent Versace =

American photographer

Vincent Versace is an American photographer and a Nikon Ambassador. He is a recipient of the Computerworld Smithsonian Award in Media Arts & Entertainment. His work is part of the permanent collection of the Smithsonian Institution's National Museum of American History.

== Career ==
At age seven, Versace was introduced to photography and the darkroom by his uncle, a wedding photographer. Versace saved his allowance to purchase a Nikon rangefinder at a garage sale and, at the age of nine, he sold his first photo to a local newspaper for $50. In high school, Versace followed in his uncle's footsteps and photographed weddings.

Versace attended Wayne State University, The University of Michigan, the American Conservatory Theater, Boston University College of Fine Arts. the Master of Fine Arts program at USC Film School.

In 1991, Versace began experimenting with digital photography in additional to traditional photography. He was Epson America and Nikon's first beta tester for digital printers and cameras. He was the artist in residence at the Altamira Group and consultant to the President of Kodak's Digital & Applied Imaging Group. Versace was a featured guest speaker at the 1998 National convention of Professional Photographers of America, and was asked to be part of the Vision Gallery at the 1999 Fall Seybold Show.

Versace was commissioned by the San Francisco Presidio National Trust to create a body of photographic work to permanently capture the 1480 acre forest that is a National Park and Historic Landmark. He was instrumental in the development of Nik Software and was the original host of the Epson Print Academy.

Versace is a Nikon Ambassador, as well as brand ambassador for Epson Stylus Pro, X-rite Coloratti, WestcottU, Lexar Elite Photographer and BenQ. He speaks publicly and consults for these companies, OnOne, Adobe, and other photography tech companies.

Versace has taught, traveled, and shot extensively around the world for American Photo Mentor Treks and other travel workshops in countries including Iceland, Egypt, Morocco, Argentina, Chile, and Uruguay. A member of the board of directors for Palm Beach Photographic Centre, he also leads their workshops to Cuba, Peru, India, Burma, Vietnam and Cambodia. During one of his trips to Burma, he photographed Nobel Peace Prize winner Aung San Suu Kyi.

Domestically, Versace has taught photography and conducted workshops at B&H, the FBI, US Navy Combat Camera, US Coast Guard, Photoshop World, Maine Media Workshops, American Photo Master Classes and Santa Fe Workshops. He has given talks at Talks At Google and teaches through his own company, Acme Educational.

A member of the National Association of Photoshop Professionals Dream Team, he has been recognized with the creation of the Vincent Versace Award for Digital Photography Excellence, also called "The Vinnie."

== Published works ==
He has published three books on photography. His first book was Welcome to Oz: A Cinematic Approach to Digital Still Photography with Photoshop and named as one of the top digital books of 2007 by Shutterbug Magazine. The second book, Welcome to Oz 2.0, a complete rewrite of his first to include the science of focus and blur, and ExDR. His third book, From Oz to Kansas: Almost Every Black & White Technique Known to Mankind, was published in 2012.

Versace has written for American Photography Magazine and been featured in The New York Times. His photography has been featured in Popular Photography, Shutterbug, Petersen's Photographic, PC Camera, What Digital Camera, Studio Design and Photography, Professional Photographer, Digital Imagining, Digital Camera, and I/O Magazine.
