= Second inauguration of Barack Obama =

57th United States presidential inauguration

Second presidential inauguration of Barack Obama
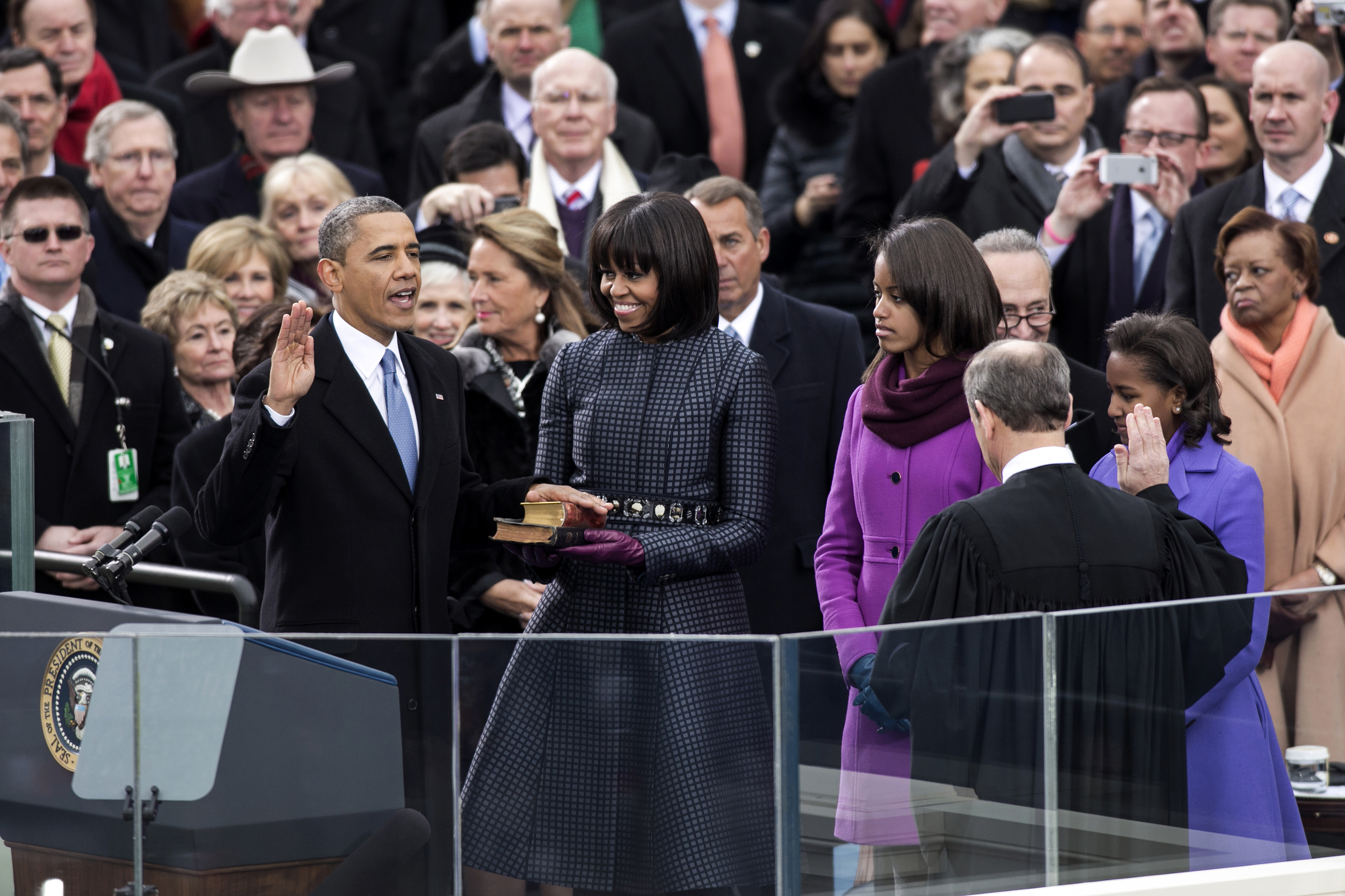
- Barack Obama takes the oath of office for his second term.
- Date: January 20, 2013; 13 years ago (official); January 21, 2013; 13 years ago (public)
- Location: Obama: Blue Room, White House (official) Biden: Number One Observatory Circle, United States Naval Observatory (official) Both: United States Capitol, Washington, D.C. (public)
- Organized by: Joint Congressional Committee on Inaugural Ceremonies
- Participants: Barack Obama; 44th president of the United States — Assuming office John Roberts; Chief Justice of the United States — Administering oath Joe Biden; 47th vice president of the United States — Assuming office Sonia Sotomayor; Associate Justice of the Supreme Court of the United States —Administering oath

The second inauguration of Barack Obama as president of the United States was the 57th inauguration, marking the commencement of his second and final term, with Joe Biden as vice president. This is the most recent presidential inauguration where the incumbent president was sworn in for a consecutive second term after winning reelection. A private swearing-in ceremony took place on Sunday, January 20, 2013, in the Blue Room of the White House, followed by a public inauguration ceremony on Monday, January 21, 2013, at the West Front of the United States Capitol in Washington, D.C.

The inauguration theme, "Faith in America's Future," commemorated the 150th anniversary of Abraham Lincoln's Emancipation Proclamation and the completion of the Capitol dome in 1863. This theme emphasized the perseverance and unity of the United States, reflecting the "Forward" theme employed during the closing months of Obama's reelection campaign. Inaugural events in Washington, D.C., from January 19 to 21, 2013, featured concerts, a national day of community service on Martin Luther King Jr. Day, the swearing-in ceremony, a luncheon and parade, inaugural balls, and an interfaith inaugural prayer service. Chief Justice of the United States John G. Roberts administered the presidential oath to Obama during the swearing-in ceremonies on January 20 and 21, 2013. This is the most recent inauguration in which a vice president would go on to become president (Biden, eight years later, in 2021). Biden is also the most recent Vice President to be sworn in for a second term.

In his second inauguration address, Obama proclaimed that "while freedom is a gift from God, it must be secured by His people here on Earth". He called for laws to combat climate change, enactment of immigration reform and gun control. Obama stated that more progress was needed on human rights and civil rights (including racial minority rights, women's rights, and LGBT rights). He vowed to promote democracy abroad and stated that the United States must "be a source of hope to the poor, the sick, the marginalized, the victims of prejudice" around the world. Additionally, the president vowed to keep existing alliances strong, emphasized the economic recovery and the end of wars, and stated that "no one has a greater stake in a peaceful world than its most powerful nation". During the speech, Obama linked the Seneca Falls Convention, Selma to Montgomery marches and Stonewall riots.

Approximately one million people attended the inauguration, and millions more watched from around the world.

== Planning ==
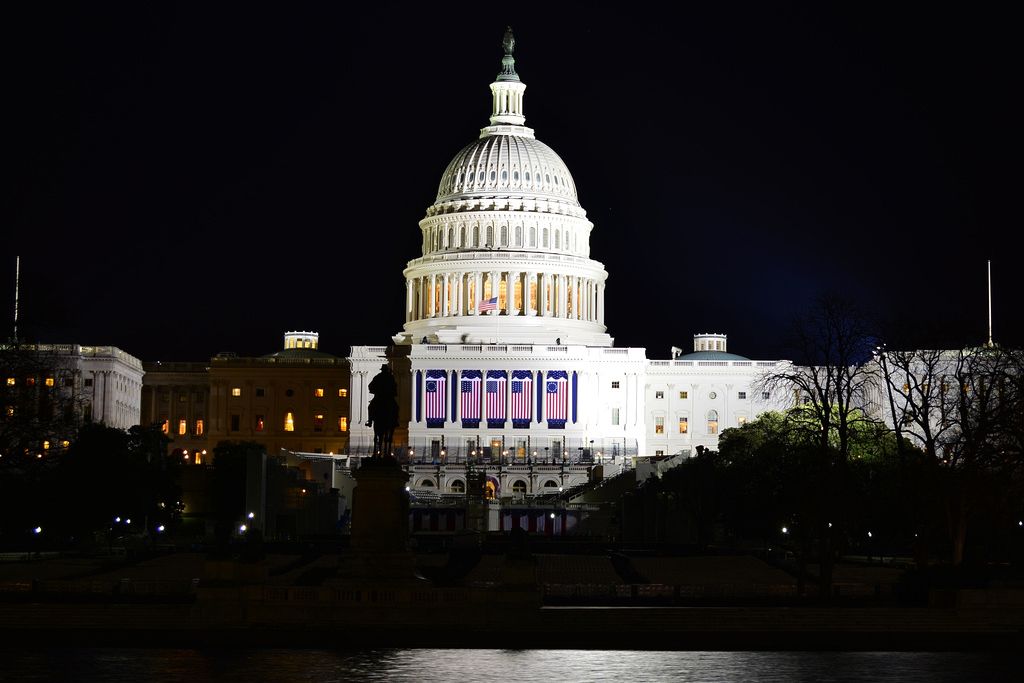
The Capitol, inauguration preparations complete, January 19, 2013, two days prior to the public ceremonies

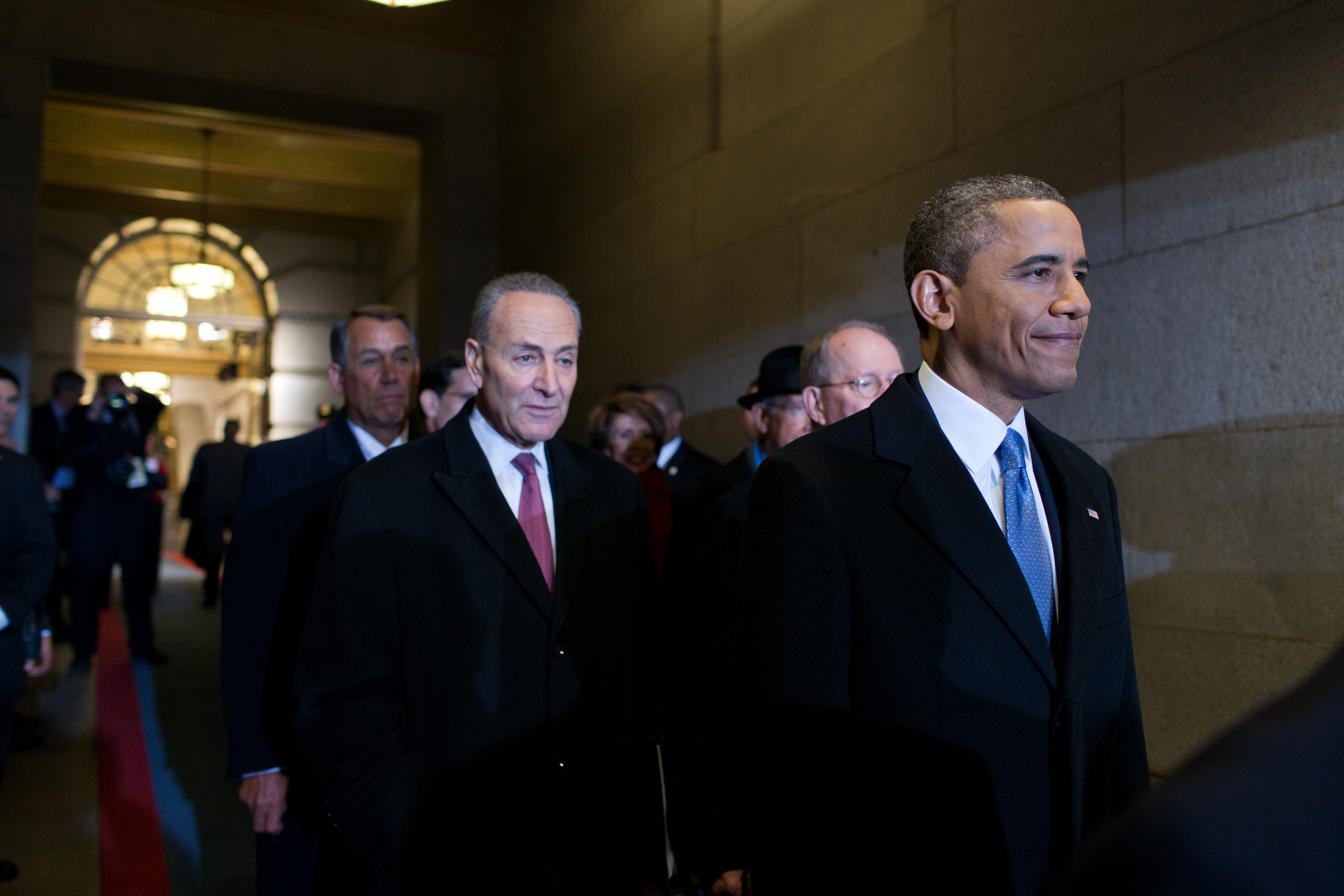
President Obama arriving at his second inauguration

The inauguration was planned primarily by two committees: the Joint Congressional Committee on Inaugural Ceremonies and the 2013 Presidential Inaugural Committee. The committee began construction of the inaugural platform on September 20, 2012.

=== Joint Congressional committee ===
The swearing-in ceremony and the inaugural luncheon for President Obama and Vice President Biden were planned by the Joint Congressional Committee on Inaugural Ceremonies, a committee composed of United States Senators Charles Schumer of New York, committee chair, Lamar Alexander of Tennessee and Harry Reid of Nevada, and United States Representatives John Boehner of Ohio, Eric Cantor of Virginia and Nancy Pelosi of California. The committee is overseen by the U.S. Senate Committee on Rules and Administration.

Military support to the 57th inauguration was coordinated by Joint Task Force National Capital Region, providing musical military units, marching bands, color guards, ushers, firing details, and salute batteries.

On January 7, 2013, Louie Giglio was selected to deliver the benediction at the ceremony. Giglio at first accepted, but then withdrew in response to a controversy over a mid-1990s sermon "in which he called on Christians to fight the 'aggressive agenda' of the gay-rights movement". The substitution of Rev. Luis Leon, pastor of Saint John's Church near the White House, was announced on January 15.

Myrlie Evers-Williams, widow of civil rights activist Medgar Evers, delivered the invocation.

On January 8, 2013, Richard Blanco was named the inaugural poet for Barack Obama's second inauguration, the fifth person to play that role. He was the first immigrant, first Latino, first gay person, and at the time, the youngest to be inaugural poet.

=== Presidential Inaugural Committee ===
The 2013 Presidential Inaugural Committee organized several other inauguration-related events at the direction of the President and Vice President of the United States, such as the concerts, parade, balls and prayer service. The co-chairs of the committee were former presidents Jimmy Carter, George H. W. Bush, Bill Clinton, and George W. Bush, along with Ambassador Matthew Barzun, Eva Longoria, Jane Stetson and Frank White. Other positions were held by Jim Messina, who oversaw the Inaugural parade, Stephanie Cutter, Jen O'Malley Dillon, Julianna Smoot, Rufus Gifford and Patrick Gaspard.

== Pre-inaugural events ==
=== Kids' Inaugural: "Our Children. Our Future." ===
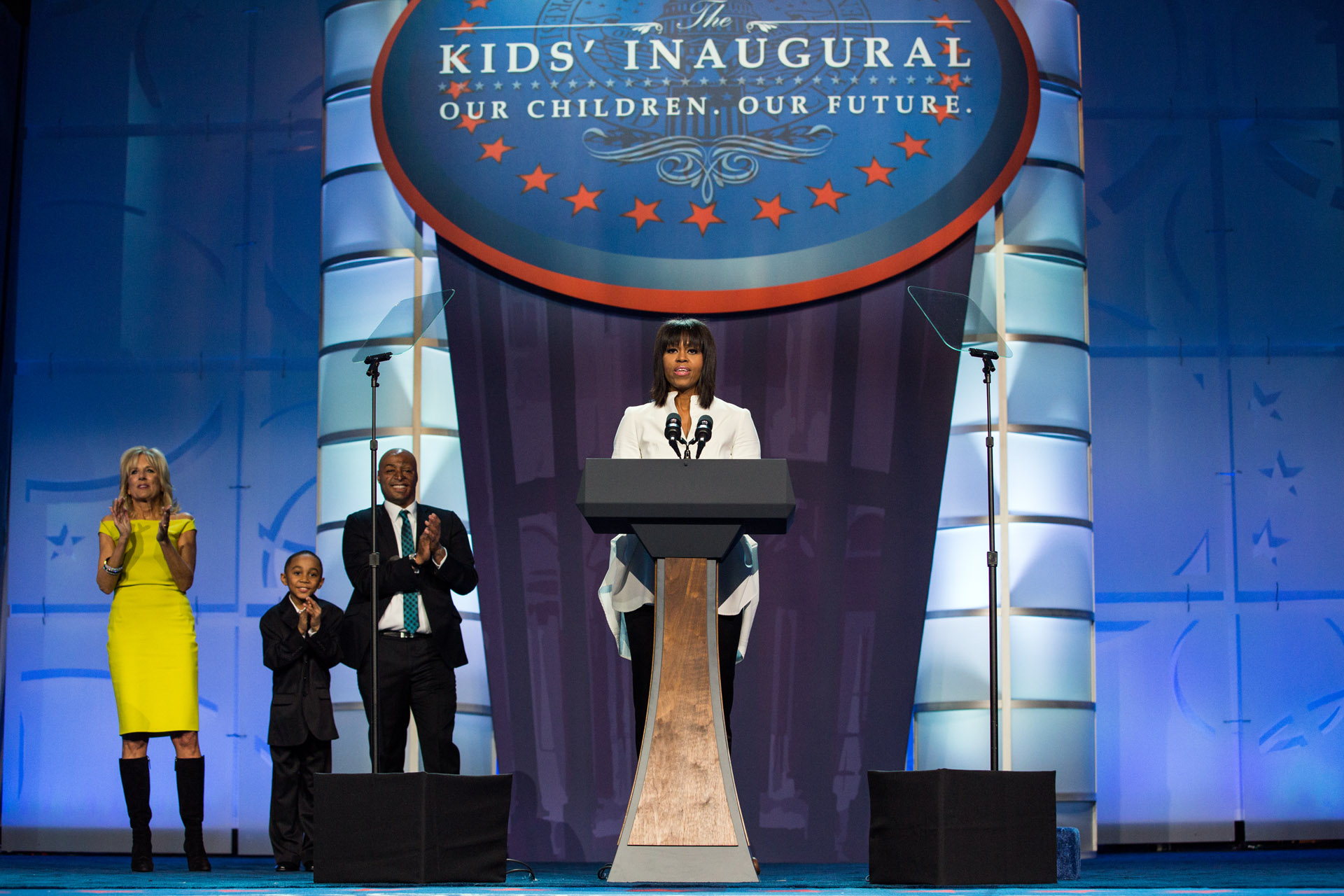
First Lady Michelle Obama delivers remarks during the Kids' Inaugural Concert at the Walter E. Washington Convention Center. Second Lady Jill Biden (left) stands in the background.

On the evening of January 19, 2013, Michelle Obama and Jill Biden hosted the "Kids' Inaugural: Our Children. Our Future." event at the Washington Convention Center in Washington, D.C. Katy Perry, Usher, and members of the cast of Glee honored military families in concert. Other celebrity participants included Mindless Behavior, Far East Movement, and Nick Cannon, who served as emcee for the event. In keeping with the service theme of the day, Michelle Obama issued a call for children to become engaged in public service by volunteering in homeless shelters, visiting seniors, or writing letters to U.S. troops.

== Inaugural events ==
=== Official swearing-in ceremonies ===
President Barack Obama being sworn in by the Chief Justice of the United States Supreme Court John Roberts, and accompanied by his family in an official, private ceremony at the White House

Since 1937, the four-year term of the president and vice president have ended and begun at noon on January 20, as prescribed by the Twentieth Amendment to the United States Constitution. Because January 20, 2013, fell on a Sunday, both Obama and Biden were officially sworn in privately, and then again the following day in a public ceremony. This was the fifth time, since the start of Rutherford B. Hayes's term in office, in 1877, that the oath of office was officially administered in a Sunday private ceremony. Chief Justice John Roberts administered the oath of office to the President on January 20 in the Blue Room at the White House. Associate Justice Sonia Sotomayor administered the oath to the Vice President on the same date at Number One Observatory Circle, the official residence of the vice president. While reciting his oath, Biden's hand rested upon a Bible that had been in his family since 1893 and which he had used in every swearing-in ceremony since entering the U.S. Senate in 1973. Obama used a Bible owned by the family of First Lady Michelle Obama when he took his oath of office.

This was only the third time in history that a vice president was sworn in outside of the Capitol grounds, after William King's in Matanzas, Cuba in 1853, and Harry Truman at the White House in 1945.

The weather conditions for the outdoor ceremony on January 21 at 12 noon at Ronald Reagan Washington National Airport, located 3.1 miles from the Capitol, were: 40 °F (4 °C), wind 10 mph, and mostly cloudy.

=== Public inauguration: "Faith in America's Future" ===
The public inaugural ceremony took place at the West Front of the United States Capitol on January 21, 2013. The ceremony opened with the playing of pre‑recorded music and a live performance of the Fifth-grade chorus from Public School 22, followed by "The President's Own" United States Marine Band. Senator Charles Schumer, chair of the Joint Congressional Committee on Inaugural Ceremonies, acted as the day's Master of Ceremonies. Courtney Williams, Senior Chief Musician and concert moderator for the U.S. Navy Concert Band, served as the platform announcer.

Myrlie Evers-Williams, the widow of slain civil-rights leader Medgar Evers, delivered the invocation, followed by a performance of "The Battle Hymn of the Republic" by the Brooklyn Tabernacle Choir. Vice President Biden took his oath from Associate Justice Sonia Sotomayor. After completing his oath of office as the vice president, Biden received in his honor the first playing of four ruffles and flourishes and the march "Hail, Columbia" by members of the armed forces. This was followed by a performance of "America the Beautiful" by James Taylor.

After the performance of "America the Beautiful", Chief Justice John Roberts administered the oath of office to President Obama. After he had completed the oath of office as the president, Obama received in his honor the 21-gun salute and the first playing of four ruffles and flourishes and the march "Hail to the Chief" by members of the armed forces. Following the salute, Obama delivered his inaugural address to the crowds as the president of the United States at 11:53 AM Eastern Time, which was 2,137 words long and took 18.5 minutes to deliver. This was followed by a performance by vocalist Kelly Clarkson, who sang "My Country, 'Tis of Thee". Poet Richard Blanco then delivered the inaugural poem, followed by Rev. Luis Leon, who delivered the benediction. Vocalist Beyoncé concluded the ceremony with a performance of the United States national anthem, "The Star-Spangled Banner".

==== Oath of office ====
During the public inaugural ceremony at the United States Capitol on January 21, Associate Justice Sotomayor administered the oath to Vice President Joe Biden, and then Chief Justice Roberts administered the Presidential oath to President Barack Obama minutes after Vice President Biden received his oath. At the public inaugural ceremony, Vice President Biden was sworn in using the Biden family Bible, while President Obama was sworn in using two Bibles owned by Abraham Lincoln and Martin Luther King Jr. President Obama became the 17th U.S. president to be re-elected for a second term of office.

==== Inaugural address ====
President Obama takes the public oath of office and delivers his second inaugural address.

After Barack Obama had recited the oath of office, he delivered his inaugural address. The inaugural address was 2,137 words long and President Obama took 18.5 minutes to deliver it between 11:53 a.m. and 12:12 p.m. In a speech "heavy on broad rhetoric and light on policy specifics" as noted by the Washington Post Obama's second inaugural speech was regarded as laying out a broad liberal or progressive agenda, supporting gay rights and climate change reform. Obama, who "largely eschewed foreign policy except to recommend engagement over war, and instead focused on addressing poverty and injustice at home", delved in broad strokes into the United States past and its future as he called on ordinary Americans to "shape the debates of our time." Rejecting the belief that in America "freedom is reserved for the lucky, or happiness for the few" and arguing that "preserving our individual freedoms ultimately requires collective action" Obama said "now decisions are upon us, and we cannot afford delay. We cannot mistake absolutism for principle or substitute spectacle for politics or treat name-calling as reasoned debate. We must act."

Barack Obama used the opening words of the U.S. Constitution's preamble, "We, the people", to suggest how to reconcile America's founding truths and the current discord and dysfunction of its embittered political system. He also referenced America's Declaration of Independence stating that our inalienable rights, such as Life, Liberty and the pursuit of Happiness, may be self-evident, but never have been self-executing. Obama again invoked the Declaration of Independence by telling his audience: "What makes us exceptional, what makes us America, is our allegiance to an idea articulated in a declaration made more than two centuries ago: We hold these truths to be self-evident, that all men are created equal."

Obama went on, saying "all of us are created equal" and that the shared equality of the American people guided the United States "through Seneca Falls and Selma and Stonewall"—linking the Seneca Falls Convention, Selma to Montgomery marches and Stonewall riots as key moments in women's rights activism, the civil rights movement, and the LGBT rights movement in the United States together.

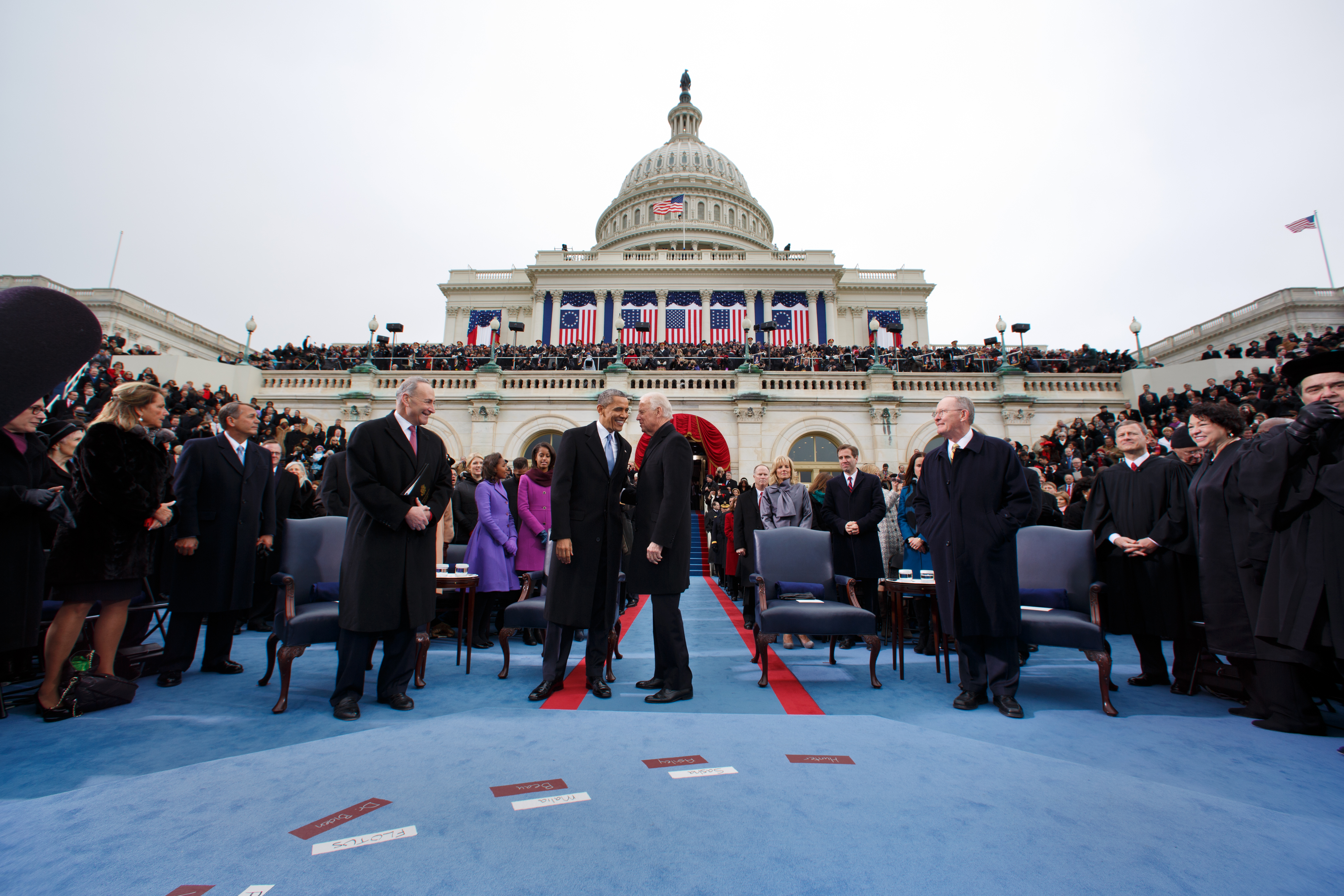
Obama talks with Biden during the inaugural swearing-in ceremony.

Additional words indicated a commitment to LGBT rights: "Our journey is not complete until our gay brothers and sisters are treated like anyone else under the law—for if we are truly created equal, then surely the love we commit to one another must be equal as well." These words made Obama the first president to use the word gay as a reference to sexual orientation in an inaugural address. Some analysts interpreted his statement as a reaffirmation of President Obama's previously stated support for same-sex marriage. Others noted that all nine justices of the Supreme Court were seated nearby when Obama linked gay and lesbian rights to two other groups whom the court treats with special consideration: women and racial minorities.

President Obama also spoke firmly about climate change, immigration reform, and gun control, and argued that they represented important issues for this generation to solve. Noting that "none can avoid the devastating impact of raging fires and crippling drought and more powerful storms" Obama stated that his administration "will respond to the threat of climate change, knowing that the failure to do so would betray our children and future generations." He also argued that America must lead in this area: "The path towards sustainable energy sources will be long and sometimes difficult. But America cannot resist this transition; we must lead it. We cannot cede to other nations the technology that will power new jobs and new industries — we must claim its promise." "That is how we will preserve our planet, commanded to our care by God."

Obama commented on the role of government that "Progress does not compel us to settle centuries-long debates about the role of government for all time — but it does require us to act in our time." And he added while the American people never gave up their skepticism of a strong federal government, they also never believed that the government can fix all ills. In order to prepare America for a rapidly changing world he stressed the need for the political leaders of America to act in common cause. The president argued that "now decisions are upon us and we cannot afford delay." Obama also made what appeared to be an oblique reference to the partisan battles between himself, the Republican-controlled House and the Senate — where Democrats had control but not a filibuster-proof majority. In reference to the unalienable rights of Life, Liberty, and the pursuit of Happiness Obama declared in the context of the partisan battles that "[b]eing true to our founding documents does not require us to agree on every contour of life; it does not mean we will all define liberty in exactly the same way, or follow the same precise path to happiness." Obama said that the politically gridlocked capital — and, implicitly, the Republicans who have fought his ideas during the 2012 U.S. presidential election — was moving too slowly at a critical moment. "We cannot mistake absolutism for principle, or substitute spectacle for politics, or treat name-calling as reasoned debate," Obama said. "We must act, knowing that our work will be imperfect." Obama added that "the oath I have sworn before you today, like the one recited by others who serve in this Capitol, was an oath to God and country, not party or faction — and we must faithfully execute that pledge during the duration of our service."

The president also addressed the issue of wealth inequality in the United States noting that America "cannot succeed when a shrinking few do very well, and a growing many barely make it." "We are true to our creed when a little girl born into the bleakest poverty knows that she has the same chance to succeed as anybody else, because she is an American, she is free, and she is equal, not just in the eyes of God but also in our own," he declared. Obama spoke of the need to reduce America's health care costs and America's deficit, but he repudiated that America must choose between "caring for the generation that built this country and investing in the generation that will build its future." "The commitments we make to each other — through Medicare and Medicaid and Social Security — these things do not sap our initiative; they strengthen us," Obama said. "They do not make us a nation of takers; they free us to take the risks that make this country great."

While praising U.S. Armed Forces members for their bravery and strength, Obama asserted that "enduring security and lasting peace do not require perpetual war." This statement was made in the foreign policy section of his inaugural address in which Obama promised diplomacy of engagement backed with military steel, but he did not dwell on specific crises like Iran. "We will show the courage to try and resolve our differences with other nations peacefully - not because we are naive about the dangers we face, but because engagement can more durably lift suspicion and fear." He also declared the United States "must be a source of hope for the poor, the sick, the marginalized, the victims of prejudice ..." and stand for "human dignity and justice." Barack Obama also challenged those who favor aggressive use of the powerful U.S. military, calling them to remember the policies of presidents past. "We are also heirs to those who won the peace and not just the war, who turned sworn enemies into the surest of friends, and we must carry those lessons into this time as well," said Obama. Obama vowed America "will remain the anchor of strong alliances" and it will support democracy around the world.

The inaugural address made at several points references to famous speeches of America's former leaders. Barack Obama referenced Martin Luther King's I Have a Dream speech by noting that "we cannot walk alone." Obama also made several references to past presidential inaugurations. He referenced the country's civil war experience and its slavery history with allusions to phrases used by Abraham Lincoln: "Through blood drawn by lash and blood drawn by sword, we learned that no union founded on the principles of liberty and equality could survive half-slave and half-free." This was an allusion to "until every drop of blood drawn with the lash shall be paid by another drawn with the sword" from Abraham Lincoln's second inauguration address. The inaugural address of John F. Kennedy was also referenced. Obama's "this generation of Americans has been tested by crises that steeled our resolve and proved our resilience" and later description of "brave men and women in uniform, tempered by the flames of battle" was an allusion to Kennedy's line of a "new generation of Americans—born in this century, tempered by war, disciplined by a hard and bitter peace." Obama's assertion that America is willing to negotiate with its adversaries "not because we are naïve about the dangers we face, but because engagement can more durably lift suspicion and fear" was reminiscent of Kennedy's words that "civility is not a sign of weakness ... Let us never negotiate out of fear. But let us never fear to negotiate."

Barack Obama described the American state of affairs with references to the wars in Afghanistan and Iraq as well as the 2007–2009 recession in the United States as follows: "This generation of Americans has been tested by crises that steeled our resolve and proved our resilience. A decade of war is now ending. An economic recovery has begun. America's possibilities are limitless." Obama then added a collective call to action: "My fellow Americans, we are made for this moment, and we will seize it - so long as we seize it together." Noting that "Decisions are upon us, and we cannot afford delay" Obama stressed the need of shielding the weak, the poor and those lacking health care and demanded equality for all races and gay rights, and security from gun crime for children. In the Washington Post, Chris Cillizza stated in this context that Obama's overall inaugural message was "That we are all in this together and that we will ultimately be judged by how we treat the lowest among us." Cillizza pointed to five sentences of Obama's speech which contained not only Obama's agenda for his second term but also "outlined what he wanted his second term to be—and to mean":

It is now our generation's task to carry on what those pioneers began. For our journey is not complete until our wives, our mothers and daughters can earn a living equal to their efforts. Our journey is not complete until our gay brothers and sisters are treated like anyone else under the law for if we are truly created equal, then surely the love we commit to one another must be equal as well. Our journey is not complete until no citizen is forced to wait for hours to exercise the right to vote. Our journey is not complete until we find a better way to welcome the striving, hopeful immigrants who still see America as a land of opportunity until bright young students and engineers are enlisted in our workforce rather than expelled from our country. Our journey is not complete until all our children, from the streets of Detroit to the hills of Appalachia, to the quiet lanes of Newtown, know that they are cared for and cherished and always safe from harm.

==== Inaugural poem ====
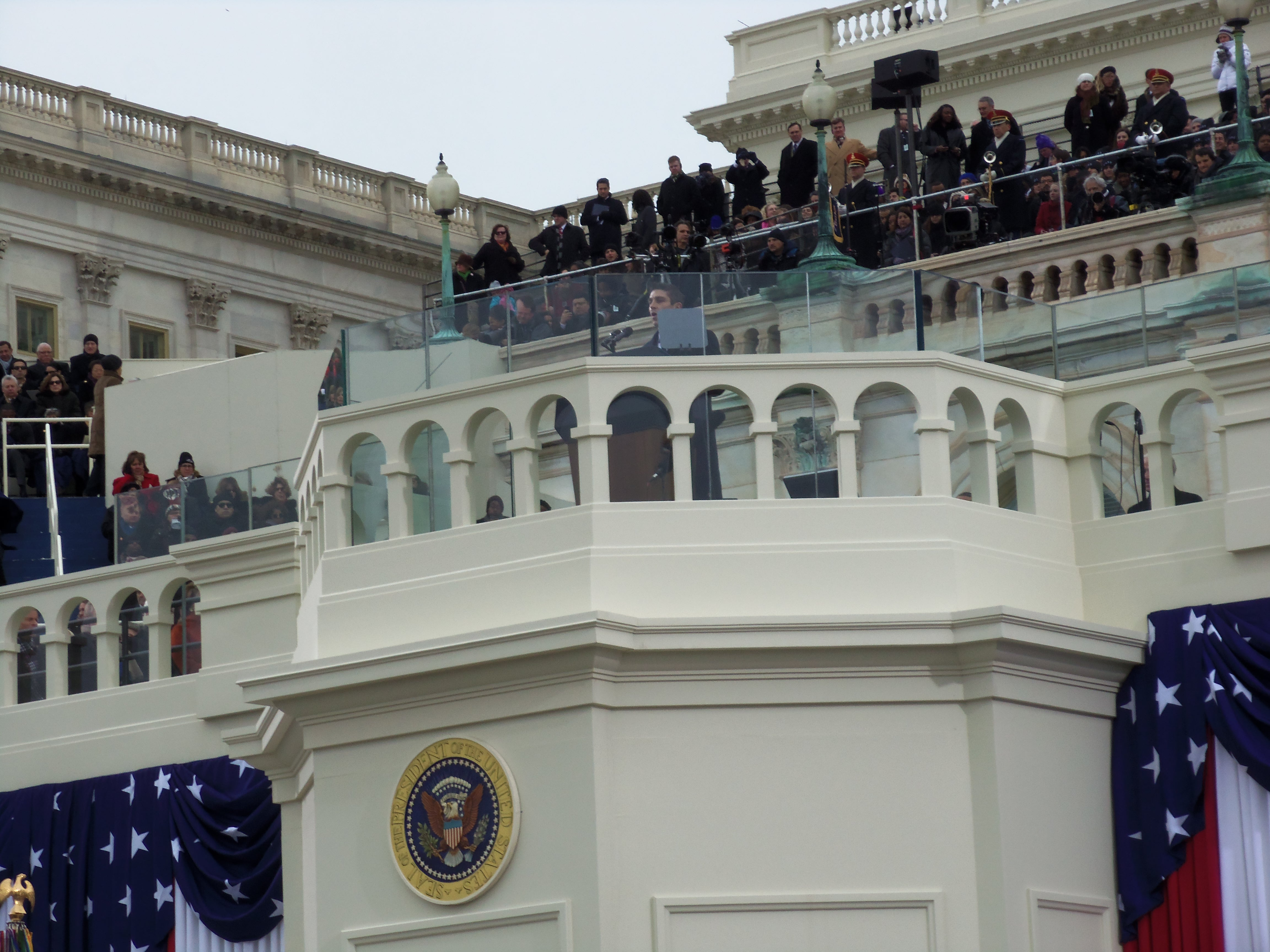
Blanco reading his poem One Today

Richard Blanco read a poem he wrote for the occasion, One Today. One critic called it "a rare break from the staid custom of ceremony that the rest of the afternoon brought" and another described it as "art meant to orient, to reconfirm collective identity in a time of recent tragedy. ... an optimistic, careful piece meant to encourage, a balm."

=== Post-ceremony traditions ===
At the conclusion of his inaugural address, Obama walked back into the Capitol building, then turned for a moment to look out at the National Mall, filled with hundreds of thousands of flag-waving Americans. He said to those close to him: "I want to take a look one more time. I'm not going to see this again." Shortly afterward, he signed the Capitol's guest book.

Then, in the President's Room of the U.S. Capitol, with the bipartisan congressional leadership looking on, Obama signed documents submitting the nominations of his nominees for several Cabinet posts, the secretaries of State, Defense and Treasury and the head of the CIA.

==== Congressional luncheon ====
During the subsequent luncheon, Obama dined on bison and lobster with select members of Congress and guests in the Capitol's National Statuary Hall.

There was some controversy regarding the choice of water for the luncheon, as Senator Schumer's endorsement of the Saratoga Spring Water Co. providing sparkling water for the event was met with criticism from the President of DC Water, George S. Hawkins, as well as from conservation activists Adam Macon and Kirstin Urquiza. Ultimately, these objections were taken into account, with Schumer later informing Hawkins that still water, if requested by guests, would be sourced from DC Water.

Following the luncheon, Obama returned to the White House in the inaugural parade.

==== Inaugural parade ====
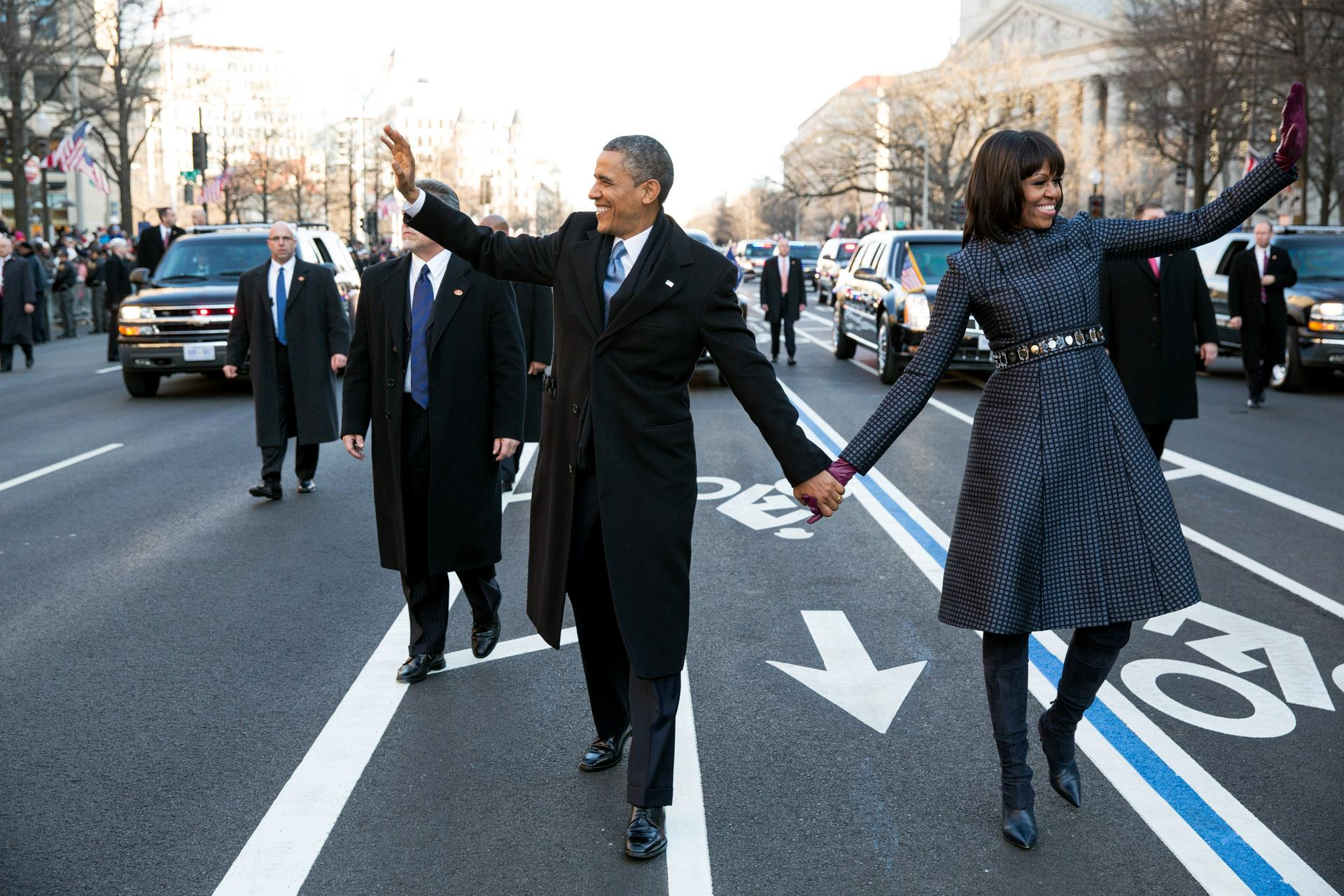
President Barack Obama and First Lady Michelle Obama walking in the inaugural parade following the public inauguration at the United States Capitol building

The inaugural parade route ran along Pennsylvania Avenue, N.W. from the U.S. Capitol, ending at the north face of the White House. During most of the parade, President Obama and First Lady Michelle Obama traveled in the armored limousine. The President and First Lady exited their limousine, walking on Pennsylvania Avenue for portions of the parade. Vice President Biden, and his wife Jill, also walked the parade route.

==== Inaugural balls ====
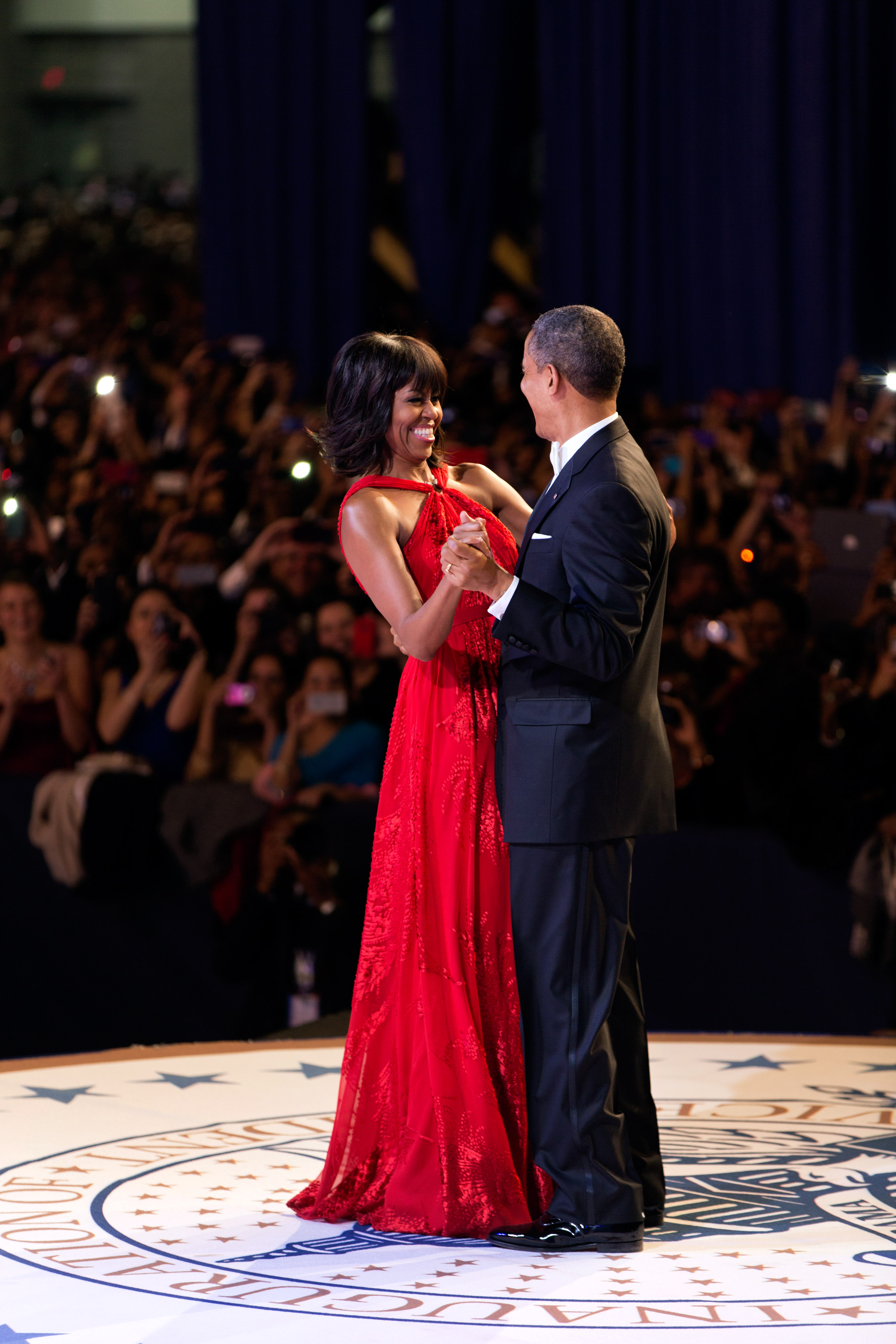
President Barack Obama and First Lady Michelle Obama dance during one of the inaugural balls.

In a departure from the number of evening balls for the first Obama inauguration, only two official inaugural balls were held to on January 21 celebrate the second inauguration. President Obama and First Lady Michelle Obama attended the Commander-In-Chief's Ball held for members of the U.S. military and attended the Inaugural Ball, an invitation-only public gala held as a unified celebration for all Americans. Both inaugural balls were held on January 21 at the Walter E. Washington Convention Center in Washington, DC. Jennifer Hudson serenaded the Obamas as they danced to Al Green's "Let's Stay Together" during both the Commander-in-Chief's Ball and the Inaugural Ball. Other performers who were scheduled to perform at the inaugural balls included Usher, Alicia Keys, Black Violin, Brad Paisley, Far East Movement, Fun, members of the Glee cast, John Legend, Maná, Smokey Robinson, Soundgarden, and Stevie Wonder.

On January 22, a private staff-only inaugural ball was held for White House aides and administration staff, Obama for America campaign staff, and the Inaugural Committee staff, was held at the Walter E. Washington Convention Center, a tradition started by the President and First Lady during the 2009 inauguration to express thanks for the work of the staff. Lady Gaga and Tony Bennett provided entertainment for the group.

President Obama and the First Lady Michelle Obama led the group in the chant, "fired up, ready to go" that was carried over from the 2008 and 2012 election campaigns. President Obama expressed gratitude and honored the aides and campaign staff for their work, telling the group that "'it makes [him] know that America's future is in good hands' ... 'as long as all of you understand the immense and incredible power that you possess when you work together, when you join voices.'"

During the staff inaugural ball, President Obama also paid tribute to Alex Okrent, a 29-year-old campaign staffer who died after collapsing at the 2012 Obama campaign headquarters in Chicago. Proceeds from ticket sales for the staff inaugural ball, where tickets sold at $10.00 apiece, were used to support a memorial fund for Okrent.

==== National prayer service ====
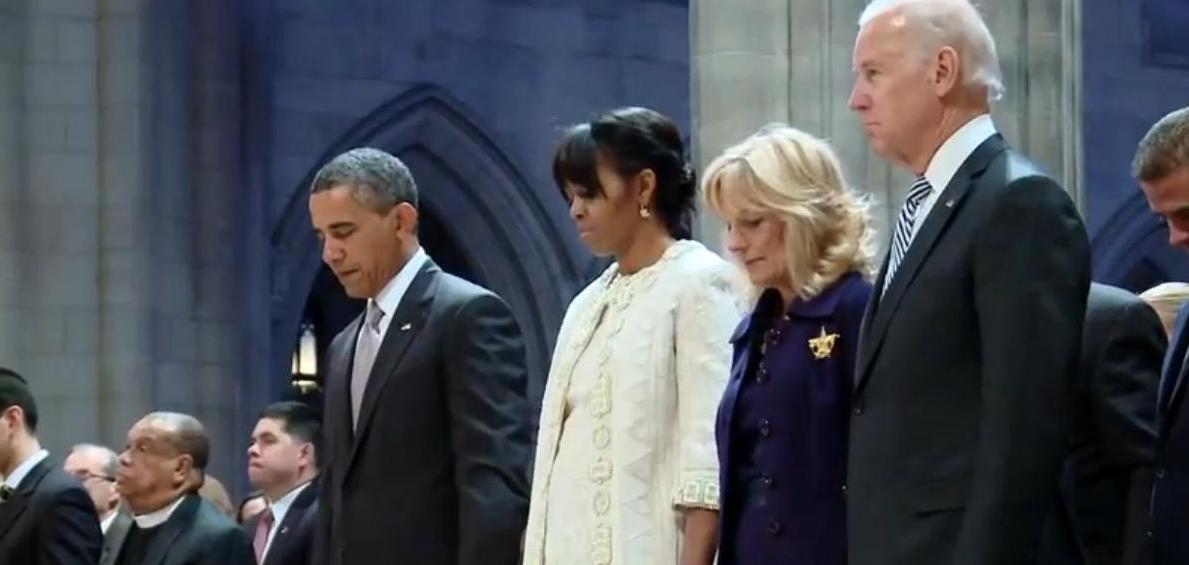
President Obama and Vice President Biden and their wives in the front pew at the Washington National Cathedral on January 22, 2013

President Obama, First Lady Michelle Obama, Vice President Biden and his wife, Jill Biden, gathered at the Washington National Cathedral on January 22, 2013, for a national day of prayer. The prayer service was attended by dignitaries and guests of diverse faiths for a day of prayers, readings, and musical performances. As in the case of the prayer service for the 2009 inauguration, the theme of the interfaith worship service reflected inclusiveness and religious diversity, ranging from a mix of Protestant pastors, female Rabbi, Hindu, and Muslim religious leaders to Catholic and Episcopal bishops. Featured speakers at the prayer service included religious leaders from the National African American Clergy Network, Islamic Society of North America, in addition to the Metropolitan Community Churches that served as a spiritual refuge and place of worship for gay Christians. The sermon was delivered by the Rev. Adam Hamilton (pastor) of the United Methodist Church of the Resurrection in Leawood, Kansas.

== Reaction to inaugural address ==
The loudest response from the audience at the National Mall coincided with Obama's remarks supporting equal pay for women and equal treatment for LGBT people, when he stated that America's journey to equality is incomplete "until our wives, our mothers, and daughters can earn a living equal to their efforts," and "until our gay brothers and sisters are treated like anyone else under the law." Obama "made history", said Human Rights Campaign president Chad Griffin, when Obama connected the struggle of gay couple to the equal rights movement writ large. "By lifting up the lives of LGBT families for the very first time in an inaugural address, President Obama sent a clear message to LGBT young people from the Gulf Coast to the Rocky Mountains that this country's leaders will fight for them until equality is the law of the land," Griffin said in a release. This was however rejected by Brian Brown, president of the National Organization for Marriage, which has led campaigns against legalizing same-sex marriage. Brown said gay couples are "already treated equally under the law." "They have the same civil rights as anyone else; they have the right to live as they wish and love whom they choose," he said in a release. "What they don't have is the right to redefine marriage for all of society."

Obama's second inaugural speech was regarded as laying out a broad liberal or progressive agenda, supporting gay rights and climate change reform. David Gergen, professor of public service and director of the Center for Public Leadership at Harvard University's Kennedy School of Government, for example, called the speech "the strongest embrace of 20th-century liberalism since Lyndon Johnson and the Great Society. And Brian Balogh, a professor of history at the University of Virginia's Miller Center, added that Obama's second inaugural address mattered in comparison to previous second inaugural speeches "because future historians will mark it as the moment that Obama explained why he is a progressive. The programs that Obama called for were characteristically liberal: reaffirming the social safety net, equal pay for women, etc. Nothing new here -- just the Obama classic. What differed this time, and what this moment was made for (to twist the president's own words) was articulating the progressive rationale for these programmatic ends. "Preserving our individual freedoms ultimately requires collective action," Obama proudly told the nation." The Washington Post's Zachary A. Goldfarb, who covers economic policy and the White House for the Post, rejected the notion that Obama's speech was liberal. He wrote: "Obama did not advance a liberal agenda. A consequential one, certainly, but one that reflects centrist views or center-left ones at most. The agenda seems liberal only when judged against the liberal-conservative divide we're used to in Washington. ... Obama's inaugural speech sounded liberal because he offered the kind of robust defense of government's role in the nation's life that has seldom been heard from Democratic politicians after President Bill Clinton declared in 1996 that 'the era of big government is over.'"

Republican congressional leaders had a muted, bipartisan response to Obama's second inaugural address and expressed their hope for cooperation between their party and Obama. "There are plenty of areas of disagreement but there are also some things that, fundamentally, we agree on -- and that is this country is one of opportunity," House Majority Leader Eric Cantor said. He added that there were partisan differences over "the way we get there to help everybody. ... Hopefully, we can bridge those differences." Cantor however warned, that, if Obama follows what Cantor called a liberal agenda, then that agenda it's not designed to bring Republicans and the president together. Senate Minority Leader Mitch McConnell stated in a written statement that every four years on Inaugural Day America shows the world that its major political parties can disagree with civility and mutual respect. McConnell wrote that Obama's speech was a "fresh start" to address the issue of federal spending and debt: "Republicans are eager to work with the president on achieving this common goal and we firmly believe that divided government provides the perfect opportunity to do so. Together, there is much we can achieve." He also praised Obama's speech as "a really good speech. People can criticize President Obama about a lot of things. But not his ability to communicate. I think he communicated to the American people a message of hope, a message of action and I liked it very much."

Other Republicans were critical of Obama. House Budget Committee Chairman Paul Ryan said Obama mischaracterized Republicans' position on federal entitlement programs. "No one is suggesting that what we call our earned entitlements – entitlements you pay for, like payroll taxes for Medicare and Social Security – are putting you in a 'taker' category." Ryan contended that Obama made a "switcheroo" in his speech by suggesting that Republicans have referred to beneficiaries of those programs as "takers." In reality, he said, that term refers to recipients of welfare and other non-"earned" entitlements. U.S. Senator Mike Lee, a frequent Obama critic, expressed his opinion that Obama chose not to unite the country, but to divide the American people. "This is not the approach of a leader attempting to find solutions to problems but rather the tactics of a partisan trying to pick political fights. His vision for the next four years is clear: defend a broken system, ignore the fiscal crisis, and drive future generations further into debt." Other Republicans like John McCain ("I didn't hear any conciliatory remarks") and "pundits from the D.C. establishment" also complained about Obama's speech. The Washington Post's Dana Milbank, for example, wrote that Obama's address "was less an inaugural address for the ages than a leftover campaign speech combined with an early draft of the State of the Union address."

While Professor of history and public affairs at Princeton University Julian Zelizer called the speech a "powerful oration for a contentious moment in national politics", Georgetown University professor Donna Brazile called it "a deeply moving and patriotic speech" and "one of the most effective usages of the founding documents' principles as a supporting narrative -- drawing us from the past to the present to the future" by "a president sharing with the nation his values most personal and vision most spiritual." Oxford University historian Timothy Stanley wrote that Obama, compared to "one of those "bring us together", delivered "a more policy specific speech that reflected the difficult, partisan reality of 2013." Obama's moral commitment to gay rights - expressed in the words "for if we are truly created equal, then surely the love we commit to one another must be equal as well" was "controversial but admirably courageous." For Maria Cardona, a former senior adviser to Hillary Clinton, "Obama's message is still one of hope and change. ... He gave his supporters hope he will continue to fight for them. He gave all Americans the assurance the country will continue to change for the better."

Senior political columnist for Newsweek and The Daily Beast John Avlon lauded Obama for "an audacious speech to the extent that Obama sought to reclaim politicized concepts like American exceptionalism from their conservative contexts, making the case that the combination of diversity and opportunity makes the American Dream possible for each new generation." But Avlon also criticized Obama writing that "the scope of the speech was sprawling and dotted with policy references more suited to a State of the Union address. It was not tightly framed or focused on a single concept, nor was there a single clear phrase that summed up the speech, at least at first listen."

President Jimmy Carter's former deputy chief speechwriter Gordon Stewart wrote that Obama's "magnificent" second inaugural address was far better than his first inaugural address. Stewart lauded that Obama for emerging "as a leader who has stopped splitting differences and is prepared to make choices and fight for them." According to Stewart both Obama's supporters and opponents have a clearer idea what Obama will do in his second term. Former CNN producer and correspondent Frida Ghitis complained that Obama devoted nearly all his inaugural speech to domestic issues and said that international disengagement isn't an option for America. According to Ghitis the aspirations Obama "expressed for America are the ones he should express for our tumultuous planet." She expressed her hopes that Obama "can remember America's leadership position and devote more attention to those around the world who see it as a source of inspiration and encouragement." After neglecting to mention a single foreign country by name during his address, The Economist concluded that Obama's "second term will have little emphasis on foreign affairs."

Gergen noticed that Obama stressed equality in the tradition of Abraham Lincoln's Gettysburg Address and Martin Luther King's "I Have a Dream". According to Gergen the speech Obama's was "firmest attempt to build upon Lincoln and King - and in effect, his address made him their modern heir." President Obama's green jobs adviser in 2009, Van Jones, called Obama's speech "offered the best rebuttal to date" since "President Ronald Reagan launched an era of anti-government politics with his first inaugural address.". Comparing Reagan and Obama, Van Jones wrote: "Instead of "government is the problem," the president reminded us that we could all fall victim to sudden misfortune. Instead of pinning blame for every social problem on the size of government, the president recognized both individual responsibility and the role of community in giving each child the opportunity to succeed." Van Jones noted both presidents invoked famous places of American history in their inaugural addresses but differed substantially in these places. While Reagan chose places of battles, Obama "tied Stonewall in with Selma and cemented his declaration that lesbian, gay, bisexual and transgender rights are civil rights." David Rothkopf, CEO and editor-at-large of the FP Group (publishers of Foreign Policy magazine), wrote that Obama rightly demanded equal rights for gays and equal pay for women. According to Rothkopf Obama's words sketched an America better than what the Founding Fathers of the United States imagined. Rothkopf wrote: "The great beauty of the speech was not in any particular phrase, but in that the man in question and the country he leads were in so many ways far beyond what the Founders could have imagined. And that, despite our natural tendency to glorify our origins, that this America was in virtually every way better than the one they offered up to us."

== See also ==
- Presidency of Barack Obama
- First inauguration of Barack Obama
- Timeline of the Barack Obama presidency (2013)
- 2012 United States presidential election
- Barack Obama 2012 presidential campaign
