= Henry Horenstein =

American artist/photographer (born 1947)

- Born: 1947 (age 78–79); New Bedford, Massachusetts, U.S.

Henry Horenstein (born 1947) is an American artist, photographer, filmmaker and educator. He is the author of over 40 books, including a series of instructional textbooks.

== Life and work ==
He studied history at the University of Chicago and earned his BFA and MFA at Rhode Island School of Design (RISD), where he is now professor of photography. He has worked as a professional photographer, filmmaker, teacher, and author since the early 1970s. He was also an Honored Educator with the Society for Photographic Education in 2023..

Honky Tonk: Portraits of Country Music (2003) is a documentary survey of country music during the late 1970s and early 1980s. Honky Tonk has also been presented as an exhibition at many public and private museums and galleries, notably the Smithsonian's National Museum of American History in 2006, the Rhode Island School of Design Museum in 2005, and The Annenberg Space for Photography in 2014.

In recent years, Horenstein has been working on short documentary films. His films include Murray (2010), with William A. Anderson and Hillary Spera; Spoke (2014), a celebration of the Austin, Texas, dance hall, the Broken Spoke, which was funded by The Annenberg Space for Photography and screened at the Austin Film Festival; Partners (2018), which premiered in May 2018 at Boston's Museum of Fine Arts; and Blitto Underground (2021), about bohemian Buenos Aires, which premiered at the International Film Festival in Buenos Aires, the Paris Independent Film Festival, and the Berlin International Art Film Festival. His film about Cajun Louisiana, called Marksville, LA, is scheduled for a 2027 release as well as Preacher 1996: The Lost Footage, a short film on boogie-woogie piano player Preacher Jack.

Speedway 1972, his photographs shot at the Thompson Speedway (Connecticut) 50 years ago, was published by Stanley/Barker (UK) in 2022. We Sort of People, in collaboration with writer Leslie Tucker, was published by Kehrer Verlag (Germany) in 2023. Miles & Miles of Texas was published by Honky Tonk Editions in Boston, MA in fall 2025.

Also to be published by Honky Tonk Editions in 2027, La Louisiane, a collection of Horenstein's work from 1975-2020.

Horenstein lives in Boston.

== Publications ==
- Black and White Photography: A Basic Manual, Little, Brown, 1974, 1983, 2005
- Beyond Basic Photography: A Technical Manual, Little, Brown, 1977
- The Photographer's Source: A Complete Catalog, Simon & Schuster, 1989
- Baseball Days: From the Sandlots To The Show, text by Bill Littlefield, Bulfinch/Little, Brown, 1993
- Color Photography: A Working Manual, Little, Brown, 1995
- Racing Days, text by Brendan Boyd, Viking, 1987; (paperback edition) Owl/Henry Holt, 1995; Pond, 1999
- Branson, MO: Las Vegas of the Ozarks, Artisan/Workman, 1998
- Creatures, Pond/Consortium, 1999; (paperback edition) Stewart, Tabori, Chang, 2000
- Canine, Pond/Consortium, 2000
- Photography, co-author Russell Hart, Prentice-Hall/Pearson, 2001, 2004
- Aquatics, Stewart, Tabori, Chang, 2001
- Honky Tonk: Portraits of Country Music, Chronicle, 2003
  - Revised edition. WW Norton, 2012.
- Humans, Kehrer, 2004
- Close Relations, powerhouse, 2007
- Animalia, Pond, 2008
- SHOW, Pond, 2010
- Digital Photography: A Basic Manual, Little, Brown, 2011
- Histories, Honky Tonk, 2016
- Shoot What You Love, Monacelli, 2016
- Make Better Pictures, Little, Brown, 2018
- Henry Horenstein: Selected Works, List Gallery, Swarthmore College, 2019
- Speedway72, Stanley/Barker, 2022. ISBN 978-1-913288-47-1.
- We Sort of People, Kehrer Verlag, 2023
- Miles and Miles of Texas, Honky Tonk Editions, 2025
- La Louisiane, Honky Tonk Editions, 2027

== Films ==
- SHOW (2007) – with William A. Anderson and Hillary Spera
- Spoke (2014)
- Partners (2018)
- Blitto Underground (2021)
- Marksville, LA (2024)
- Preacher 1996: The Lost Footage (2027)

== Film Credits ==
- Imagraphy (2019)
- Country: Portraits of an American Sound (2015)
- The Photographers Series: Henry Horenstein (2014)

== Collections ==
Horenstein's work is held in the following permanent collections:

- J. Paul Getty Museum
- Museum of Fine Arts, Houston
- San Antonio Museum of Art
- Duke University's David M. Rubenstein Rare Book & Manuscript Library – holds a significant collection of Horenstein's work
- Smithsonian Museum of American History – holds a significant collection of Horenstein's work
- Allentown Art Museum
