= Andrea Modica =

American photographer

- Born: 1960; Brooklyn, New York, United States
- Known for: Photography
- Awards: Guggenheim Fellowship, Fulbright-Hays Research Grant
- Website: www.andreamodica.com

Andrea Modica (born 1960) is an American photographer and professor of photography at Drexel University. She is known for portrait photography and for her use of platinum printing, created using an 8"x10" large format camera. Modica is the author of many monographs, including Treadwell (1996) and Barbara (2002).

== Early life and education ==
Modica was born in Brooklyn, New York. She earned her BFA in Visual Arts and Art History from State University of New York College (SUNY) at Purchase, Purchase, NY in 1982, and earned her MFA in Photography from Yale University in 1985.

== Work ==
Modica's most known work is Treadwell. From 1986 to 2001, she staged and photographed a young girl named Barbara and her family in upstate New York with an 8x10 view camera, following the family from farmhouse to farmhouse in and around the town of Treadwell, New York. Chronicle Books published the work in book form in 1996. She continued to photograph Barbara until her death in 2001 from childhood diabetes. The work from the later period of Barbara's life was published by Nazraeli Press in 2004. Nazraeli Press also published Human Being, a series of 19th century human skulls that were unearthed at a mental hospital in Pueblo, Colorado.

As We Wait is a collection of previously unpublished portraits, still lifes, landscapes, and horses curated by Larry Fink in 2015 by Grafiche dell'Artiere, who also published January 1, portraits of Philadelphia Mummers in 2018.

Even before starting the series Best Friends, Modica had been photographing students at a high school in Connecticut, and she noticed that a friend was often present in the background of the photoshoots. She started photographing friends together in other high schools in Philadelphia and Modena, Italy.

For Fountain, Modica documented the Baker Family in Fountain, Colorado for nine years. The family runs a small slaughterhouse. She photographed the inner workings of the farm and the intimate family moments.

Real Indians combines first-person narratives by 37 Native American people with black and white photographic portraits of each person by Modica.

For Minor League, Modica photographed in Oneonta, New York and the New York Yankees' spring-training camp in Florida for a project on young ballplayers in 1993. She photographed the young athletes' anxieties, focusing on the minor league players who were hoping to go up.

Modica photographed and filmed horses in post-operative anesthetic states in Theatrum Equorum published by TIS books in 2022.

== Teaching ==
Modica taught photography at the State University of New York – Oneonta for thirteen years, and has also taught at Princeton University, Parsons School of Design, the State University of New York College at Purchase, and Colorado College. She is currently a professor of photography at Drexel University.

== Publications ==
- Minor League. Photographers at Work Series. Washington D.C.: Smithsonian. 1993. ISBN 156098290X.
- Treadwell. San Francisco: Chronicle. 1996. ISBN 0811811182. With an introduction by Maria Morris Hambourg and an essay by Annie Proulx.
- Human Being. Portland: Nazraeli. 2001. ISBN 1590050061. With a foreword by Modica and "Anthropological Descriptions" by J. Michael Hoffman.
- Andrea Modica: At The Edge Of Fiction. Light Work. 2001. ISBN 093544520X.
- Barbara. Portland: Nazraeli, 2002. ISBN 1590050878. With a foreword by Modica. 2002
- Real Indians. New York: Melcher. 2003. ISBN 0971793514. With an introduction by Sherman Alexie.
- Fountain. Lunenburg, VT: Stinehour, 2008. With an afterword by Modica.
- L'Amico del Cuore. Portland: Nazraeli, 2014. ISBN 978-1-59005-405-5.
- As We Wait. Italy: Grafiche dell'Artiere. 2015. ISBN 978-8887569537. With an introduction by Larry Fink.
- January 1, Italy: Grafiche dell&#39;Artiere, 2018. ISBN 9788887569568
- Lentini, Kris Graves Projects, Queens, NY, 2019
- 2020, TIS books, Brooklyn, NY, 2020. ISBN 9781943146260
- Theatrum Equorum, TIS books, Brooklyn, NY, 2022. ISBN 9781943146314

== Awards ==
- 1990: Fulbright-Hays Research Grant
- 1993: Guggenheim Arts Fellowship from the John Simon Guggenheim Memorial Foundation
- 2010 Anonymous Was A Woman Award
- 2015: John S. and James L. Knight Foundation Award

== Collections ==
Modica's work is held in the following permanent collections:

- Museum of Modern Art: 1 print (as of 1 July 2022)
- Metropolitan Museum of Art: 12 prints (as of 1 July 2022)
- Whitney Museum of American Art: 3 prints (as of 1 July 2022)
- Smithsonian American Art Museum, Washington, D.C.: 5 prints (as of 1 July 2022)
- San Francisco Museum of Modern Art: 4 prints (as of 1 July 2022)
