= Chuck Carter =

Video game designer

- Born: July 31, 1957 (age 69)
- Occupations: Video game and film artist
- Known for: Myst

Charles Michael "Chuck" Carter is a video game and film artist. He and Robyn Miller, designed and rendered the environments in the video game Myst. After Myst, he was an artist for Westwood's Command & Conquer and Command & Conquer: Red Alert series and a digital matte painter on the television series Babylon 5. His digital art clients, include Disney, NASA, National Geographic, Scientific American, and BBC. In 2017 Chuck founded his own video game studio, Eagre Games, and released the video game ZED in June 2019.
