= Richard Blanco =

Cuban American poet and professor

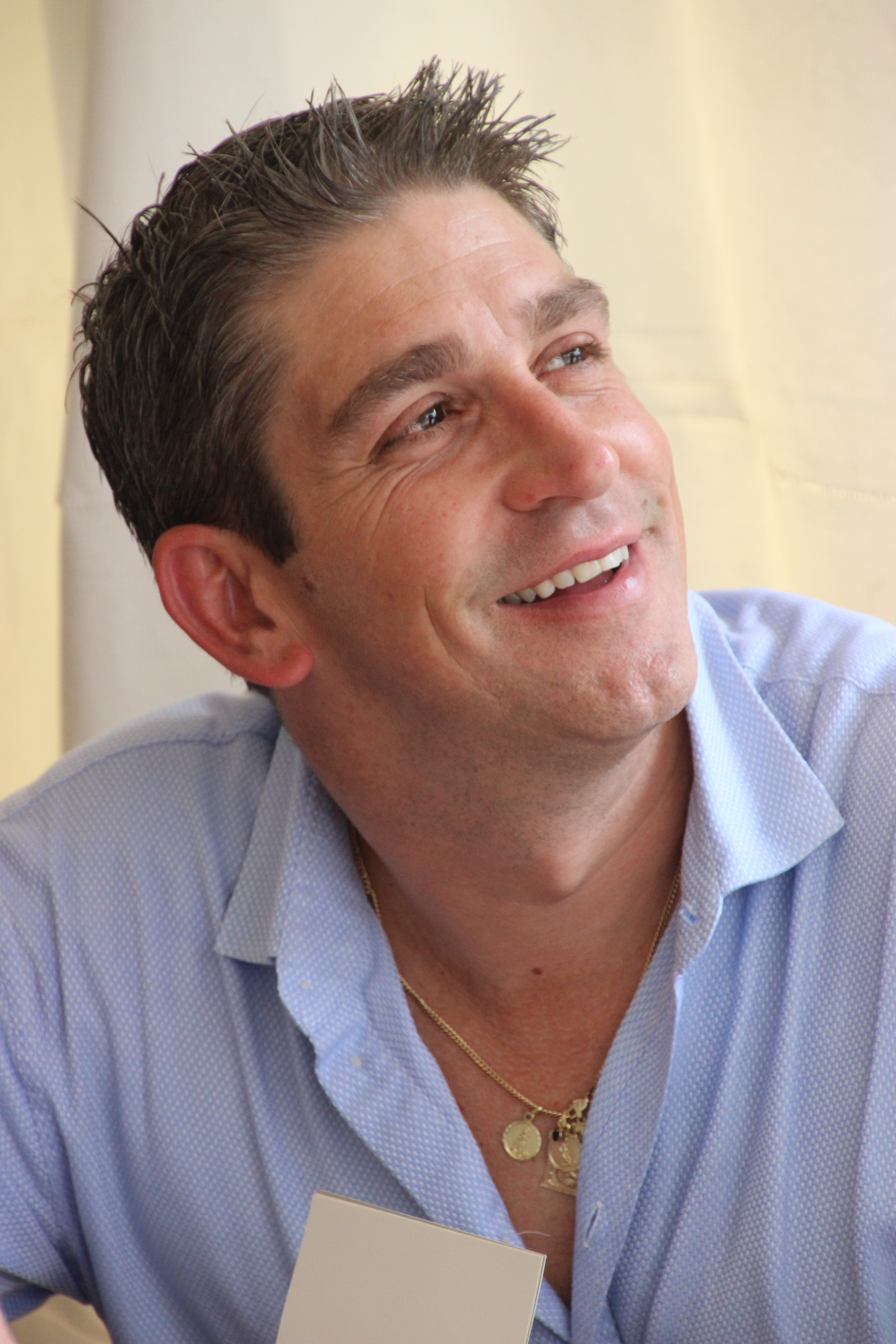
- Born: Ricardo Blanco; February 15, 1968 (age 58); Madrid, Spain
- Citizenship: American
- Education: Florida International University
- Occupations: Poet; public speaker; civil engineer; professor; memoirist; playwright; author
- Writing career
- Notable works: "One Today"; The Prince of Los Cocuyos: A Miami Childhood; How to Love a Country; For All of Us, One Today: An Inaugural Poet's Journey; Until We Could Film; Looking for the Gulf Motel; Directions to the Beach of the Dead; City of a Hundred Fires; Nowhere but Here; Boston Strong: The Poem

Richard Blanco (born February 15, 1968) is an American poet, public speaker, author, playwright, and civil engineer. He is the fifth poet to read at a United States presidential inauguration, having read the poem "One Today" for Barack Obama's second inauguration. He is the first immigrant, the first Latino, the first openly gay person and at the time the youngest person to be the U.S. inaugural poet. In 2022, Blanco was awarded the National Humanities Medal by President Biden from the National Endowment for the Humanities.

Blanco's books include Homeland of My Body: New and Selected Poems, How to Love a Country; City of a Hundred Fires, which received the Agnes Starrett Poetry Prize from the University of Pittsburgh Press; Directions to The Beach of the Dead, recipient of the Beyond Margins Award from the PEN American Center; and Looking for The Gulf Motel, recipient of the Paterson Poetry Prize and the Thom Gunn Award. He has also authored the memoirs For All of Us, One Today: An Inaugural Poet's Journey and The Prince of Los Cocuyos: A Miami Childhood, winner of the Lambda Literary Prize.

In addition, Blanco collaborated with Caldecott Medal renowned cartoonist, author, and illustrator Dav Pilkey on One Today, an illustrated children's book. He also partnered with photographer Jacob Hessler on the limited edition fine press poetry book Boundaries, with artist John Bailey on series of Ekphrastic paintings titled a Place of Mind, and with Ramiro A. Fernandez on the photography book Cuba Then.

In September 2026, Richard Blanco joined Purdue University as a Professor of English and a Dean's Fellow in the College of Liberal Arts. He previously taught at Georgetown University, American University, Central Connecticut State University, Wesleyan University, Wentworth Institute of Technology, Colby College, Carlow University, and his alma mater, Florida International University. His passion is to demystify poetry to all ages, from grade school to nursing homes, at diverse writers workshops (e.g. Omega Institute, Maine Media Workshops), correctional institutions, and several non-profit organizations including the Writer's Center. He serves as the first Education Ambassador for the Academy of American Poets.

== Biography ==
Richard Blanco's mother, seven months pregnant, and the rest of the family arrived as exiles from Cuba to Madrid, where he was born on February 15, 1968. Forty-five days later, the family immigrated once more to New York City. Blanco was raised and educated in Miami. Blanco's parents encouraged him to study engineering, believing that it could provide him a more stable future. He conceded to their wishes and graduated from Florida International University in 1991 with a degree in civil engineering. He started his career in Miami while writing poetry on the side. His first book of poetry, City of 100 Fires, explores these negotiations of cultural identity as a Cuban American immigrant.

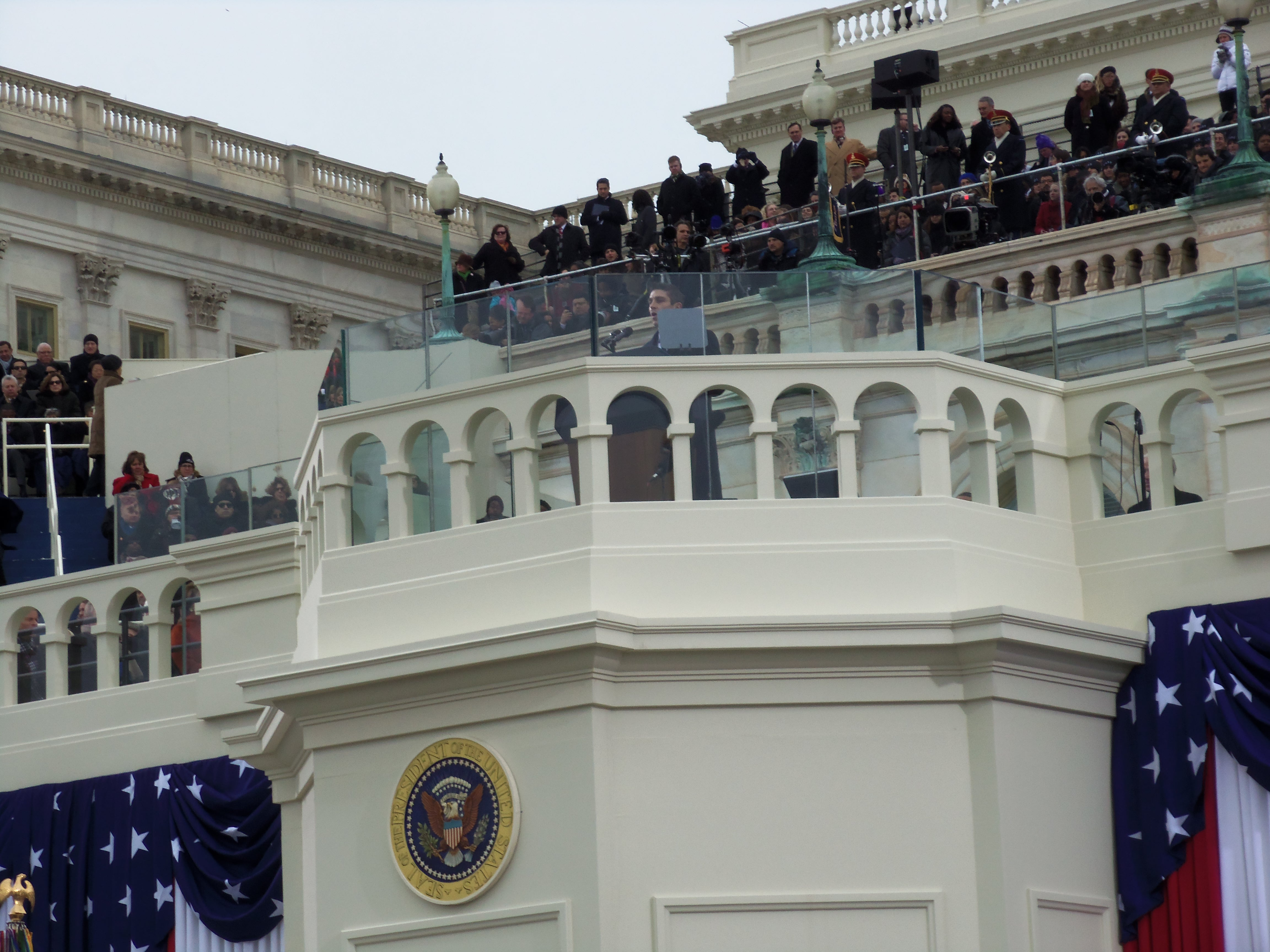
Blanco reading his poem "One Today" at the second inauguration of President Barack Obama, 2013

Between 1999 and 2001, Blanco traveled extensively through Spain, Italy, France, Guatemala, Brazil, Cuba, and New England. This wanderlust of travel exploring the meaning of home resulted in his second book of poems Directions to The Beach of the Dead.

In his third book of poetry, he explored his Cuban heritage in his early works and his role as a gay man in Cuban-American culture in Looking for the Gulf Motel (2012). He explained: "It's trying to understand how I fit between negotiating the world, between being mainstream gay and being Cuban gay." In the poem "Queer Theory, According to My Grandmother," he described how his grandmother warned him as a young boy: "For God's sake, never pee sitting down ... /I've seen you" and "Don't stare at The Six-Million-Dollar Man./I've seen you." and "Never dance alone in your room." According to Time magazine, he "views the more conservative, hard-line exile cohort of his parents' generation ... with a skeptical eye." John Dolan was critical of his style, calling his work "pure identity poetics, unsullied by one single stray thought or original turn of phrase." When asked in a May 7, 2012 interview with La Bloga whether he considered himself a Cuban writer or simply a writer, Blanco responded: "I am a writer who happens to be Cuban, but I reserve the right to write about anything I want, not just my cultural identity. Aesthetically and politically, I don't exclusively align myself with any one particular group—Latino, Cuban, gay, or 'white'—but I embrace them all. Good writing is good writing. I like what I like."

On January 8, 2013, he was named the inaugural poet for Barack Obama's second inauguration, the fifth person to play that role. He was the first immigrant, first Latino, and first gay person to be the inaugural poet. He was also the youngest. Maya Angelou said of Blanco: “He showed great courage, and it’s courage (that) is the most important of all the virtues because without courage, you can’t practice any other virtue consistently. So I was very pleased with that". He was asked to compose three poems from which inauguration officials selected the one he would read. After reading "One Today," he said to his mother: "Well, Mom, I think we're finally American." The poem he presented, "One Today", was called "a humble, modest poem, one presented to a national audience as a gift of comradeship, and in the context of political, pop, and media culture, a quiet assertion that poetry deserves its place in our thoughts on this one day, and every day." Others called it "a rare break from the staid custom of ceremony that the rest of the afternoon brought" and assessed it as "Overall, the poem is successful, art meant to orient, to reconfirm collective identity in a time of recent tragedy. It's an optimistic, careful piece meant to encourage, a balm." Blanco planned to publish all three poems he composed for the event. He did so with the publication of For All of Us, One Today on November 19, 2013. The memoir chronicles his American Dream experiences creating the poems commissioned for the inauguration. It includes "One Today" along with the two other poems, "Mother Country" and "What We Know of Country," in English and Spanish.

In May 2013, for victims and survivors of the Boston Marathon bombing Blanco wrote and performed a poem for the Boston Strong Benefit Concert at TD Garden and Fenway Park ("Boston Strong"). A chapbook of the poem was also published and net proceeds of all sales benefiting the One Fund, which helps victims of the Boston Marathon bombing. On November 22, 2013, Blanco participated in the official Tribute 50th ceremony for President John F. Kennedy. In 2016 Blanco gave National Archives keynote lecture on the National Conversation on LGBTQ Human and Civil Rights.

Blanco has been commissioned to write and perform numerous occasional poems for organizations and events such as the re-opening ceremony of the U.S. Embassy in Cuba ("Matters of the Sea / Cosas del mar"), Freedom to Marry ("Until We Could"), the Tech Awards of Silicon Valley ("Genius of Stars and Love"), the opening of Aspen Ideas Festival ("Cloud Anthem"), Orlando Pulse Nightclub Tragedy ("One Pulse - One Poem"), International Spa Association ISPA Conference and Expo ("Ignite the Self Who Loves You Most"), University of Miami commencement ("Teach Us, Then"), the Fragrance Foundation Awards at the Lincoln Center for Performing Arts ("To the Artists Invisible"), and commissioned by USA Today for National Hispanic Heritage Month ("the U.S. of us"). He collaborated with author and artist Nikki Moustaki to create a video for his poem "Election Year" that was also published in the Boston Globe two days before the 2016 election of President Donald Trump.

Since 2017, Blanco has been contributor and host of the "Village Voice" radio program on WGBH (Boston). Blanco has collaborated with Bacardi Havana Club on the launch of their heritage campaign "Don't Tell Us We're Not Cuban", Samuel Adams Brewery on "Love Conquers All, Pride" and Philadelphia Boys Choir on lyrics for Gershwin's re-imagined Cuban Overture. Other collaborations include musical compositions with Grammy Award-winning jazz/classical pianist and composer Paul Sullivan, prized composer Pablo Ortiz choral setting of "Leaving Limerick in the Rain" at Boston Symphony Hall for Terezin Music Foundation to honor the 70th Anniversary Liberation of Nazi concentration camps, and several poems from his recent book How to Love a Country by minister of music and composer Tom Davis. He was honored that his poem "One Today" was projected on the big screen at the U2 Joshua Tree tour. Most recently Blanco's poem "Looking for the Gulf Motel" was featured in PBS Poetry in America with commentary by Gloria Estefan, Jorge Moreno, America Fuentes, Genesis Berry, Vladimir Cortez, Joseph Abreu and executive producer Lisa New.

In 2020, The Atlantic commissioned a poem for the coronavirus pandemic called "Say This Isn't the End." Following the 2021 capital insurrection, he published in New York Times Magazine the poem "And So We All Fall Down" inspired by German artist Anselm Kiefer's installation: Steigend steigend sinke nieder (rising, rising, falling down). During a reprieve from the pandemic, Blanco was honored as commencement speaker for Colby College on May 23, 2021 (poem "Your Self in You, Again").

Blanco is currently on the faculty of Florida International University, his alma mater for both Bachelor of Science in Civil Engineering (1991) and Masters of Fine Arts in Creative Writing (1997). He was appointed as a founding member of President Obama Foundation Advisory Council and has lectured at the US National Archives Poetry of LGBTQ history for Human and Civil Rights. Since 2014 he has hosted visiting writers program and retreat at Gould Academy. Blanco is a member of the prestigious Macondo Writers Workshop, the workshop founded by Sandra Cisneros. Recently Blanco was elected as Vice Chair of Board of Trustees at Colby College. He and his partner live in Bethel, Maine.

Since 2013, Blanco has frequented many events in various educational institutions. At these events, he speaks of his various poetry, difficulties that he has overcome as well as offering advice for young poets and other creative writers. After the COVID-19 pandemic he shifted his approach to include mostly virtual events.

== Poetry ==
Blanco's poetry has appeared in The Nation, The New Yorker, The Atlantic, USA Today, Ploughshares, The New Republic, Indiana Review, New York Times Magazine, Michigan Quarterly Review, New England Review, VOX, Americas Review and TriQuarterly Review. He has published articles and essays in The New York Times, Conde Nast Traveler, Huffington Post, Indiana Review and several anthologies, including Norton Anthology of Latino Literature and Great American Prose Poems. Blanco is part of the online Letras Latinas Oral History Project archives.

Blanco's first book of poetry, City of a Hundred Fires, was published in 1998 to critical acclaim, winning the Agnes Lynch Starrett Poetry Prize from the University of Pittsburgh Press. The collection explored his cultural yearnings and contradictions as a Cuban-American coming of age in Miami and captured the details of his transformational first trip to Cuba, his figurative homeland.

Directions to the Beach of the Dead, published in 2005, explored the familiar, unsettling journey for home and connections, and won the PEN/Beyond Margins Award.

In 2012, Blanco's third book of poetry, Looking for The Gulf Motel, was published; it related Blanco's complex navigation through his cultural, sexual, and artistic identities, and received the Paterson Poetry Prize, the 2012 Maine Literary Award for Poetry, and the Thom Gunn Award.

Beacon Press published Blanco's fourth book of poetry, How to Love a Country, in March 2019.

Blanco's 2023 collection Homeland of My Body: New and Selected Poems was shortlisted for the 2024 Lambda Literary Award for Gay Poetry.

== Awards ==
- 1997: Agnes Lynch Starrett Poetry Prize
- 2000: John Ciardi Fellowship from the Bread Loaf Writers' Conference
- 2003: Residency Fellowship from the Virginia Center for the Creative Arts
- 2006: PEN/Beyond Margins Award for Directions to the Beach of the Dead
- 2007: Florida Artist Fellowship
- 2013: Thom Gunn Award for Gay Poetry, Looking for the Gulf Motel
- 2013: Woodrow Wilson Visiting Fellow
- 2013: United States Fifth Presidential Inaugural Poet for President Barack Obama ("One Today")
- 2013: President John F. Kennedy 50th Tribute - A Nation Remembers
- 2013: Honorary Doctor of Letters from Macalester College
- 2013: Paterson Poetry Prize
- 2014: Honorary Doctor of Letters from Colby College
- 2014: Honorary Doctor of Letters from University of Rhode Island
- 2014: International Latino Awards Winner: Best Biography – Spanish or Bilingual, For All of Us, One Today: An Inaugural Poet's Journey
- 2014: Honorary Degree from Maine College of Art
- 2015: Opening Ceremony of US Embassy in Cuba ("Matters of the Sea, Cosas del mar")
- 2015: Lambda Literary Award for memoir The Prince of Los Cucuyos: A Miami Childhood.
- 2015: First Education Ambassador Academy of American Poets.
- 2015: Maine Literary Award for memoir The Prince of Los Cucuyos: A Miami Childhood.
- 2015: Commencement Speaker University of Southern Maine. Never Stop Learning.
- 2016: Founding Member of President Obama Legacy Committee
- 2016: Honorary Doctorate Degree Lesley University
- 2016: National Archives - National Conversation on LGBTQ Human and Civil Rights
- 2018: Inter American Award – Leadership for the Americas
- 2019: Advocate Magazine 104 Champions of Pride
- 2019: Commencement Speaker and Honorary Doctor of Letters from University of Miami ("Teach U, Then" Poem)
- 2019: Carnegie Corporation Great Immigrants Award Honoree
- 2019: Gerda Haas Award for Excellence in Human Rights Education and Leadership
- 2019: Aspen Institute Ideas Festival Opening ("Cloud Anthem").
- 2020: Ernest Hemingway Distinguished Lecture and Visiting Artist (Ketchum, Idaho)
- 2021: Colby College Commencement Speaker ("Your Self in You Again")
- 2022: PBS Poetry in America Episode ("Looking for the Gulf Motel")
- 2022: Colby College Elected as Vice Chair Board of Trustees
- 2023: National Humanities Medal (2021) from the National Endowment for the Humanities
- 2024: Honorary Doctorate Degree Bates College
- 2024: Honorary Doctorate Degree Carlow University

== Bibliography ==
=== Books ===
- City of a hundred fires. University of Pittsburgh Press. 1998. ISBN 978-0-8229-5683-9.
- Nowhere But Here. Hill-Stead Museum. 2004. ISBN 978-0-9744245-1-4.
- Directions to the Beach of the Dead. University of Arizona Press. 2005. ISBN 978-0-8165-2479-2.
- Place of Mind. Floating Wolf Quarterly Chapbooks. 2011. ASIN B005JSG3AO
- Looking for the Gulf Motel. University of Pittsburgh Press. 2012. ISBN 978-0-8229-6201-4.
- One Today. University of Pittsburgh Press. 2013. ISBN 978-0-8229-6251-9.
- Boston Strong. University of Pittsburgh Press. 2013. ISBN 978-0-8229-6275-5.
- For All of Us, One Today. Beacon Press. 2013. ISBN 978-0-8070-3380-7.
- The Prince of Los Cocuyos: A Miami Childhood. Ecco Press. 2014. ISBN 978-0-0623-1376-8.
- En Busca Del Gulf Motel (Spanish). Valparaiso Ediciones. 2014. ISBN 978-8416560547
- Matters of the Sea / Cosas del mar. US Embassy in Cuba Opening Ceremony. University of Pittsburgh Press. 2015. ISBN 978-0822964001
- One Today Children's Book Illustrated by Dav Pilkey, Little Brown Press: 2015 ISBN 978-0316371445
- Counting Time Like People Count Stars: Poems by the Girls of Our Little Roses, San Pedro Sula, Honduras. Tia Chucha. 2017. ISBN 9781882688555
- Boundaries , Two Ponds Press. 2017. Limited Edition Fine Press with Photographer Jacob Hessler
- Cuba Then, Revised and Expanded, The Monacelli Press; Illustrated edition. 2018 ISBN 978-1580935104
- A Study Guide for Richard Blanco's "Translation for Mamá," Cengage Learning Gale. 2018
- How to Love a Country. Beacon Press. 2019. ISBN 9780807025918, OCLC 1043141209
- Grabbed: Poets & Writers on Sexual Assault, Empowerment & Healing (Afterword by Anita Hill). Beacon Press. 2020. ISBN 978-0807071847
- Homeland of My Body: New and Selected Poems. Beacon Press. 2023. ISBN 9780807012970

Selected Anthologies and Essays

- Michael Collier; Rita Dove, eds. (2000). The Best American Poetry 2000. University Press of New England. ISBN 978-0-74320-033-2. poetry anthology
- Michael Collier, ed. (March 1, 2000). The Bread Loaf Anthology of New American Poets. Bread Loaf Writers' Conference/Middlebury. ISBN 978-0-87451-964-8. poetry anthology
- Gerald Costanzo; Jim Daniels, eds. (2000). American Poetry: The Next Generation. Carnegie Mellon. ISBN 978-0-88748-343-1. poetry anthology
- David Lehman, ed. (April 2003). Great American Prose Poems: From Poe to the Present. Scribner Book Company. ISBN 978-0-7432-4350-6. poetry anthology
- Legitimate Dangers: American Poets of the New Century. Sarabande Books. 2006. ISBN 978-1-93251-129-1. poetry anthology
- Michael Montlack, ed. (2009). Divining Divas: 100 Gay Men on Their Muses. University of Wisconsin Press. ISBN 978-0-299-23120-0., essay anthology
- Barbara Hamby, David Kirby, eds. (2010). Seriously Funny: Poems about Love, Death, Religion, Art, Politics, Sex, and Everything Else. University of Georgia Press. ISBN 978-0820335698
- Ilan Stavans; Edna Acosta-Belén; Harold Augenbraum; María Herrera-Sobek; Rolando Hinojosa; Gustavo Pérez Firmat, eds. (2011). Norton Anthology of Latino Literature. W. W. Norton. ISBN 978-0-39397-532-1., poetry anthology
- Michael Montlack, ed. (2012). Divining Divas: 100 Gay Men on Their Muses. Lethe Press. ISBN 978-1-59021-383-4., poetry anthology
- Jim Elledge; David Groff, eds. (2012). Who's Yer Daddy. University of Wisconsin Press. ISBN 978-0-29928-940-9., essay anthology
- Martín Espada, ed. (2019). What Saves Us: Poems of Empathy and Outrage in the Age of Trump. Curbstone Books. ISBN 978-0810140776
- Thelma T. Reyna, ed. (2020). When the Virus Came Calling: COVID-19 Strikes America. Golden Foothills Press. ISBN 978-0996963275
- Anjanette Delgado, ed. (2021). Home in Florida: Latinx Writers and the Literature of Uprootedness. University of Florida Press. ISBN 978-1683402503
- Justin Jannise (2021). How to Be Better by Being Worse (New Poets of America Book 45) BOA Editions Ltd. ISBN 1950774341

== See also ==
- Cuban American literature
- List of Cuban-American writers
