= Rhiannon McGavin =

American poet (born 1997)

- Born: December 17, 1997 (age 28); Los Angeles, California, U.S.
- Education: University of California, Los Angeles (B.A.); Trinity College Dublin (M.Phil)
- Occupations: Poet, writer
- Relatives: Darren McGavin (grandfather)
- Writing career
- Genre: Poetry
- Notable works: Grocery List Poems (2021); Branches (2017)
- Notable awards: Academy of American Poets Prize (2019)

Los Angeles Youth Poet Laureate
- In office 2016–2017
- Preceded by: Amanda Gorman
- Succeeded by: Mila Cuda

Rhiannon McGavin (born December 17, 1997) is an American poet and writer. Her books include Branches (Not a Cult, 2017) and Grocery List Poems (Not a Cult, 2021). In 2016 she succeeded Amanda Gorman as Los Angeles Youth Poet Laureate. In 2020 she was a writer for the Netflix documentary-series Headspace Guide to Meditation. In 2022 she was named a George J. Mitchell Scholar to Ireland.

== Early life and education ==
McGavin was born in Los Angeles, California on December 17, 1997, to a family of actors. In 2009 she started a popular YouTube account “TheGeekyBlonde,” featuring the series “Condensed Shakespeare.”

She later attended the Los Angeles County High School for the Arts where she studied Theatre. In 2013 she joined Get Lit, a Los Angeles-based education nonprofit founded by author and educator Diane Luby Lane to increase literacy, empower youth, and energize communities through poetry. While there, she formed a Slam Poetry team called “The Poet Puff Girls” with Belissa Escobedo and Zariya Allen. Their poem “Somewhere in America” won the Brave New Voices International Youth Poetry Slam Festival. They were subsequently invited to perform the poem with John Legend at The Hollywood Bowl, and as featured guests on The Queen Latifah Show.

McGavin achieved further success with her solo poems “Smile,” “Hereditary,” and “Art Class.” Throughout her teens she was invited to perform these works and others on Button Poetry, NPR, and at the Library of Congress. During this time McGavin won a YoungArts Award for Spoken Word, was a Scholastic Art & Writing Award Finalist, and was nominated for Presidential Scholars Program. In 2016 she was named Los Angeles Youth Poet Laureate, succeeding Amanda Gorman.

== Career ==
=== Poetry ===
McGavin later enrolled at UCLA, where she earned a BA in English. While in undergrad, McGavin began moving away from spoken word, instead focusing on more traditional poetry. In 2016 she was named to The Adroit Journal's poetry mentorship program, paired with mentor Keegan Lester.

In 2017 McGavin won Teen Vogue's Lit Club Poetry Contest. Later that same year she published her first poetry collection Branches through Penmanship Books in 2017. Described as "Microscopes swivel and flowers spread as the poet wrestles with a spectrum of growing pains. These coming-of-age poems draw inspiration equally from science textbooks and fairy tales. As the final poem prays, "I will see the moon and morning and know". Branches explores what it means to live to the next day, and the next, before we fully understand what we are surviving." Branches was subsequently acquired and reprinted by Not a Cult in 2019. That same year her poem “Jewish Geography as According to Aunt L” was awarded the Fred and Edith Herman Memorial Prize from the Academy of American Poets.

McGavin published her second poetry collection, Grocery List Poems through Not a Cult in 2021. The Guardian noted, "If the word stanza means “room,” then this book is an orchard. Former Youth Poet Laureate of Los Angeles, Rhiannon McGavin crafts poems with scraps of the everyday, from dream diaries to postcards. She integrates the facts of daily life into lyric verse, switching out traditional forms easily as trying on new sweaters. Led by emotions “real as the mosaic air between screen and projector,” McGavin explores what it means to become your own calendar." In a review for Ogmios Group, Otto Goodwin noted

Grocery List Poems, McGavin’s second collection, following the publication of Branches in 2019, is a book about recovery; an exercise in returning to the comfort of one’s own body following trauma, and the alienation of an adolescence spent on the internet. This book is a definite step away from McGavin’s poetic origins in slam and spoken word, while still retaining the sense of urgency and deep emotion found in those forms.

Grocery List Poems was a Long-Listed for the 2021 Poetry Book Award, an international prize honoring the best in indie publishing. In 2022 McGavin was awarded a George J. Mitchell Scholarship to Trinity College Dublin, where she earned an M.Phil in Creative Writing. While in Ireland she won the 2023 Ireland Chair of Poetry Student Award. McGavin’s poems have appeared in The Los Angeles Times, Poets.org, and Poetry Ireland Review, among others. Her third collection, Computer Room is forthcoming.

=== Other work ===
In 2019 McGavin worked as a research assistant on Arabelle Sicardi’s book The House of Beauty (W. W. Norton & Company, 2017).

In 2020 she was a writer for the Netflix documentary-series Headspace Guide to Meditation.

In 2022 McGavin served as a story editor on the feature film How to Blow Up a Pipeline, based on the Andreas Malm book of the same name. The film premiered at the Toronto International Film Festival, and was distributed through Neon.

== Personal life ==
Her mother, Graem McGavin, is a retired actress who appeared in a string of films during the 1980s, including Angel, My Tutor, and Weekend Pass. Her grandfather was actor Darren McGavin.

McGavin is Jewish.

== Bibliography ==
- Branches. Los Angeles: Not a Cult. 2017. ISBN 9781945649370.
- Grocery List Poems. Los Angeles: Not a Cult. 2021. ISBN 9781945649318.

== Awards ==
- Ireland Chair of Poetry Student Award, 2023
- George J. Mitchell Scholarship, 2022
- Poetry Book Award, Longlist, 2021
- Academy of American Poets Prize, 2019
- Teen Vogue Lit Club Poetry Contest Winner
- Los Angeles Youth Poet Laureate, 2016
- Presidential Scholars Program, 2015
- Scholastic Art & Writing Award Finalist, 2015
- YoungArts Award for Spoken Word, 2014
