= The Hill We Climb =

Poem by Amanda Gorman

- by Amanda Gorman
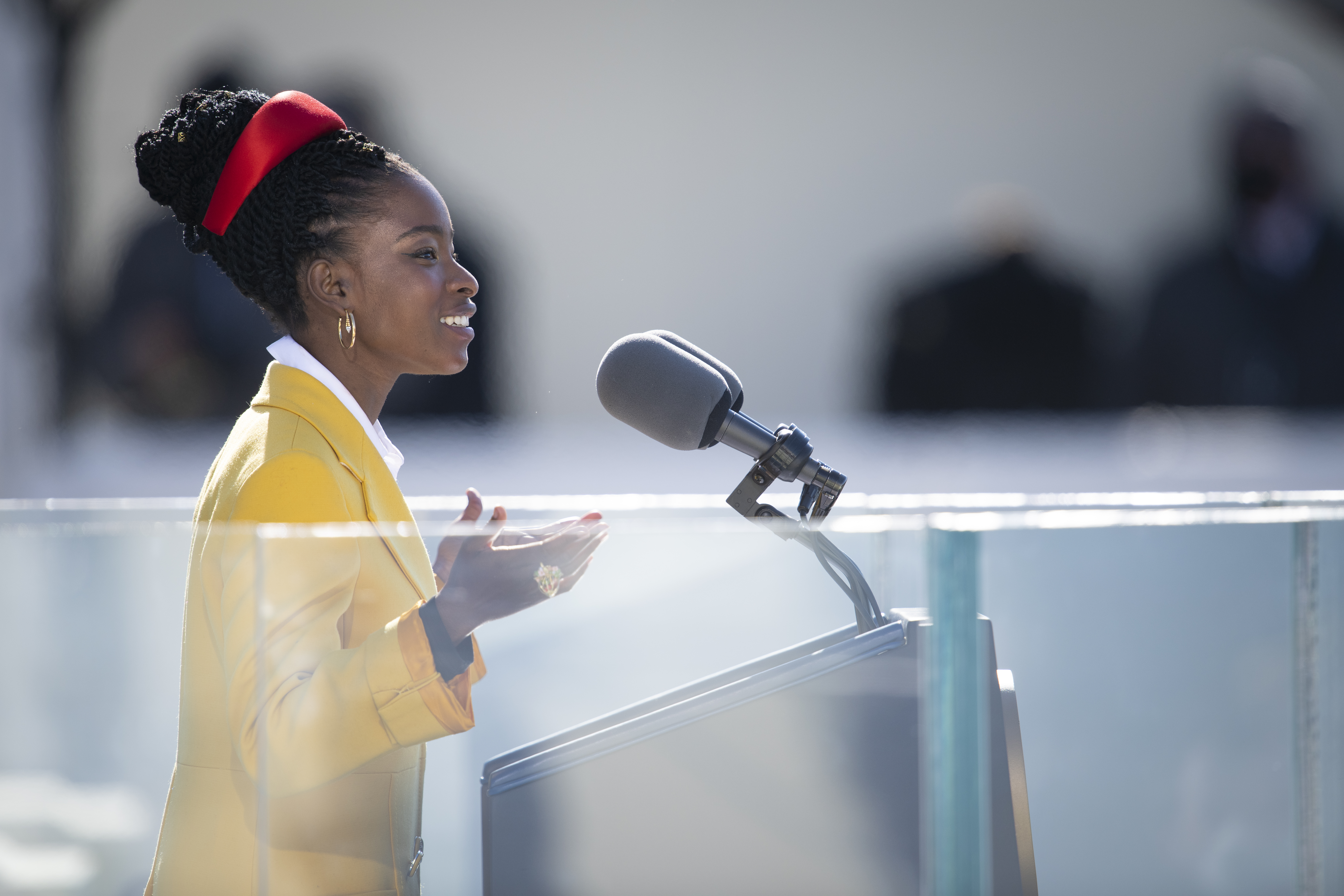
- Gorman reciting "The Hill We Climb" at Joe Biden's inauguration
- Written: December 30, 2020 – January 6, 2021
- Country: United States
- Language: English

"The Hill We Climb" is a spoken word poem written by American poet Amanda Gorman and recited by her at the inauguration of Joe Biden in Washington, D.C., on January 20, 2021. The poem was written in the weeks following the 2020 United States presidential election, with significant passages written on the night of January 6, 2021, in response to the storming of the United States Capitol. Gorman was twenty-two years old when she recited the poem, making her the youngest inaugural poet ever.

The poem was written to call for "unity and collaboration and togetherness" among the American people and emphasize the opportunity that the future holds. "The Hill We Climb" was widely praised for its message, phrasing, and delivery. Critics generally considered the recitation one of the highlights of the inauguration. Many felt that the poem represented a call for unity and would remain relevant beyond the inauguration. Gorman drew large amounts of attention, particularly on social media, after the poem's recitation and two upcoming books by Gorman topped best seller lists.

== Background and writing ==
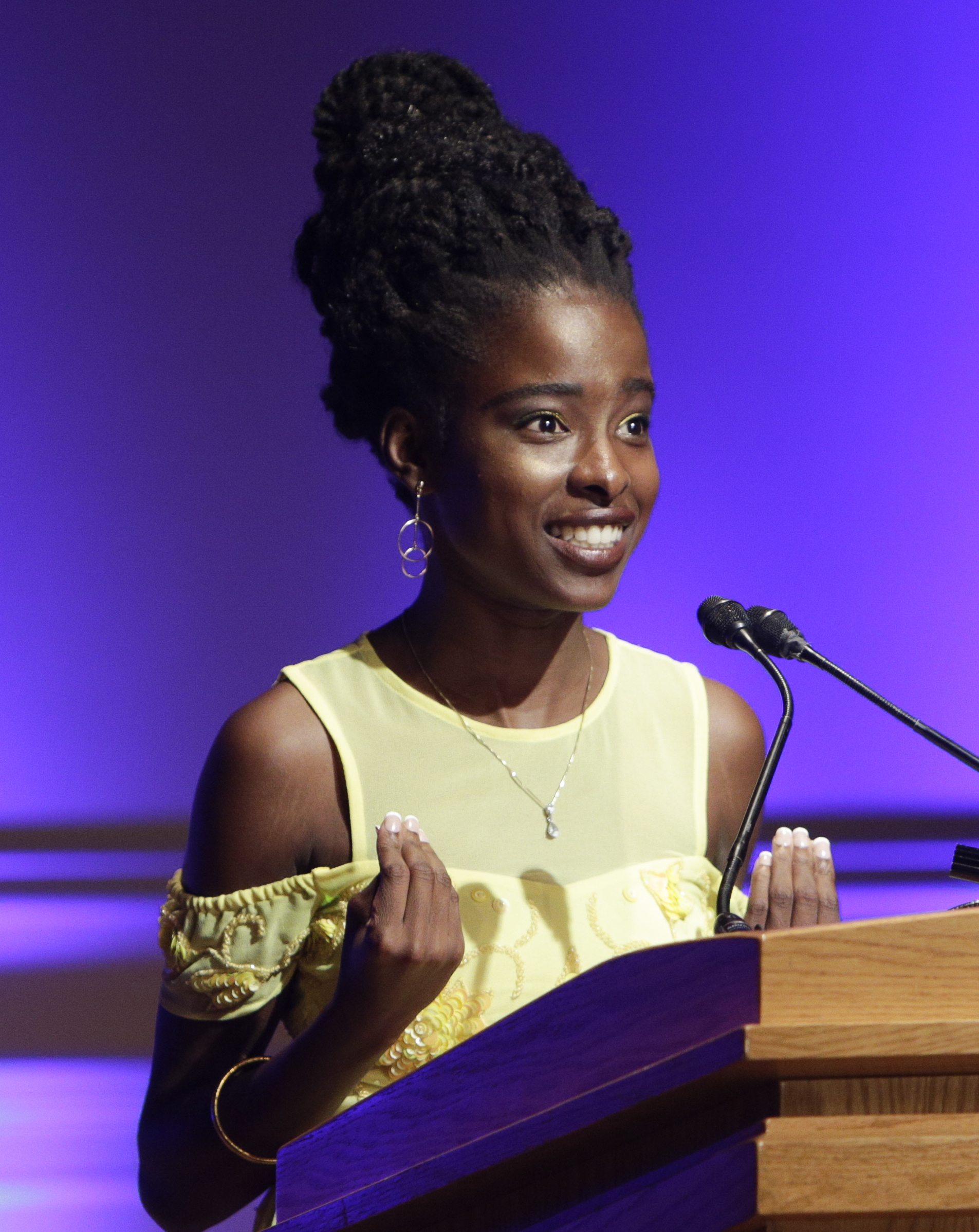
Gorman in 2017

Amanda Gorman is an American poet from Los Angeles, California. In 2017, aged 19, she was named the first National Youth Poet Laureate. On January 14, 2021, the Inaugural Committee, which was organizing the inauguration of Joe Biden in Washington, D.C., announced that Gorman would be giving a poetry reading at the event on January 20. Gorman said that she began to write the poem by reviewing poems written by past inaugural poets, who have included Robert Frost and Maya Angelou. She also studied famous orators such as Abraham Lincoln, Frederick Douglass, Martin Luther King Jr., and Winston Churchill. Gorman also spoke with Richard Blanco and Elizabeth Alexander, two previous inaugural poets.

In December 2020, Joe Biden's wife, Jill Biden, asked Gorman to deliver a poem at the inauguration. She was informed of her selection on December 30, 2020, and asked to write a poem that contributed to the inauguration's overall theme of "America United", but without any other direction. Gorman wrote several lines a day, and had the poem around half completed when the storming of the United States Capitol occurred on January 6. Gorman told The New York Times that she had been struggling to complete the poem and worrying about whether it would be adequate. In an interview with CBS News, she said that the storming marked "the day that the poem really came to life" as she worked the events into it. Gorman finished the poem on the night of January 6.

Gorman, who had a speech impediment as a child, was twenty-two years old when she read the poem, making her the youngest poet to read at a presidential inauguration. She practiced the poem repeatedly before delivering it. She said that she sought to use the poem as an opportunity to call for "unity and collaboration and togetherness."

== Content ==
When day comes, we step out of the shade aflame and unafraid. The new dawn blooms as we free it. For there is always light. If only we’re brave enough to see it. If only we’re brave enough to be it.

— Amanda Gorman, "The Hill We Climb"

"The Hill We Climb" took Gorman around five minutes to read and is 723 words long. It begins with the line: "When day comes, we ask ourselves where can we find light in this never-ending shade?" and then describes the storming of the Capitol as "a force that would shatter our nation rather than share it" before stating that, "while democracy can be periodically delayed, it can never be permanently defeated." She also spoke about her heritage, being descended from slaves, and her dreams for the future. She described America as "not broken but simply unfinished" and noted its losses but also the opportunity for reconciliation. In the poem Gorman makes use of large amounts of alliteration and "reassuring aphorisms".

The poem has several references to the musical Hamilton. After the inauguration, in response to praise from Hamilton playwright Lin-Manuel Miranda, Gorman explained that her poem includes references to the musical; Hillel Italie of The Associated Press wrote that references include the line "History has its eyes on us," which echoes the Hamilton song "History Has Its Eyes on You." The poem also references the Bible, quoting Micah 4:4: "that everyone shall sit under their own vine and fig tree, and no one shall make them afraid", a verse quoted in the Hamilton song "One Last Time". It also bears some resemblance to a famous discourse by John Winthrop, transforming the "City upon a Hill" into "The Hill We Climb".

== Reception ==
The poem was widely praised by figures including Lin-Manuel Miranda, Oprah Winfrey, Hillary Clinton, Stacey Abrams, Michelle Obama, and Barack Obama. Critics generally received the poem very well, noting that it would likely remain significant beyond the inauguration. Many critics named the poem as a highlight of the inauguration and praised Gorman's messages of unity, reflections on the past, and hope for the future. Several critics also drew parallels between her poem and the works of other inaugural poets, such as Frost and Blanco.

A critic for The Guardian, Adam Gabbatt, considered the poem a tour-de-force for Gorman, while Julie Bykowicz in The Wall Street Journal described it as a "star turn" and noted that for a time she was gaining followers on Twitter at a faster rate than Joe Biden. Jeneé Osterheldt in The Boston Globe praised the poem as "a forever spiritual to sing. A poem for us." She noted that Gorman's message could be about every African-American girl who has a dream and drew connections to Kamala Harris. Osterheldt also compared the poem and its delivery to Angelou's "On the Pulse of Morning" that was delivered at the first inauguration of Bill Clinton in 1993, and its message to Langston Hughes's "A Dream Deferred." Shayla Harris writes for Ebony that "Her poignant reflections on the country's past and her vision for progress were brought to life through masterful delivery. Through this performance Gorman has marked a place for herself in the African American oral tradition."

BBC News critic Will Gompertz described the poem as "a beautifully paced, well-judged poem for a special occasion" that would resonate beyond Biden's inauguration, and praised Gorman for delivering it with "grace." The Atlantic's Spencer Kornhaber described the reading as "flawless." A critic for NPR praised Gorman's reading, her poem, and its message. Dwight Garner of The New York Times Critic's Notebook wrote that Gorman was "a one-person reminder that if winter is here, then spring cannot be far behind," and "If her performance made you vaguely feel that you’d had a blood transfusion, it was perhaps because you could sense the beginning of a remade connection in America between cultural and political life."

Liesl Schillinger in The Guardian described the recitation of the poem as the crowning moment of Gorman's rise to become "the voice of a new American era" and called the final lines a "poetic battle cry". She also noted that Gorman's "assurance and bearing made her seem to stand outside time". Seth Perlow, an English teacher at Georgetown University, wrote in The Washington Post that, while Gorman makes use of many "generic Americanisms", she distinguished the poem "by performing with remarkable dynamism and grace". He felt that "The Hill We Climb" was not as good as Alexander's "Praise Song for the Day" but that Gorman's reading was the best reading at a presidential inauguration.

Not all reviews were positive. The journalist Melanie McDonagh received the poem negatively in The Spectator, arguing that while the delivery "stole the show" at the inauguration, the poem itself was hard to understand and poorly written. Poet and critic William Logan panned the poem in The New Criterion, describing it as "a sorry affair, composed of stock metaphors and dreary banalities, with the rhymes of a breakfast-cereal jingle and the heart of a stockbroker".

=== Outfit ===
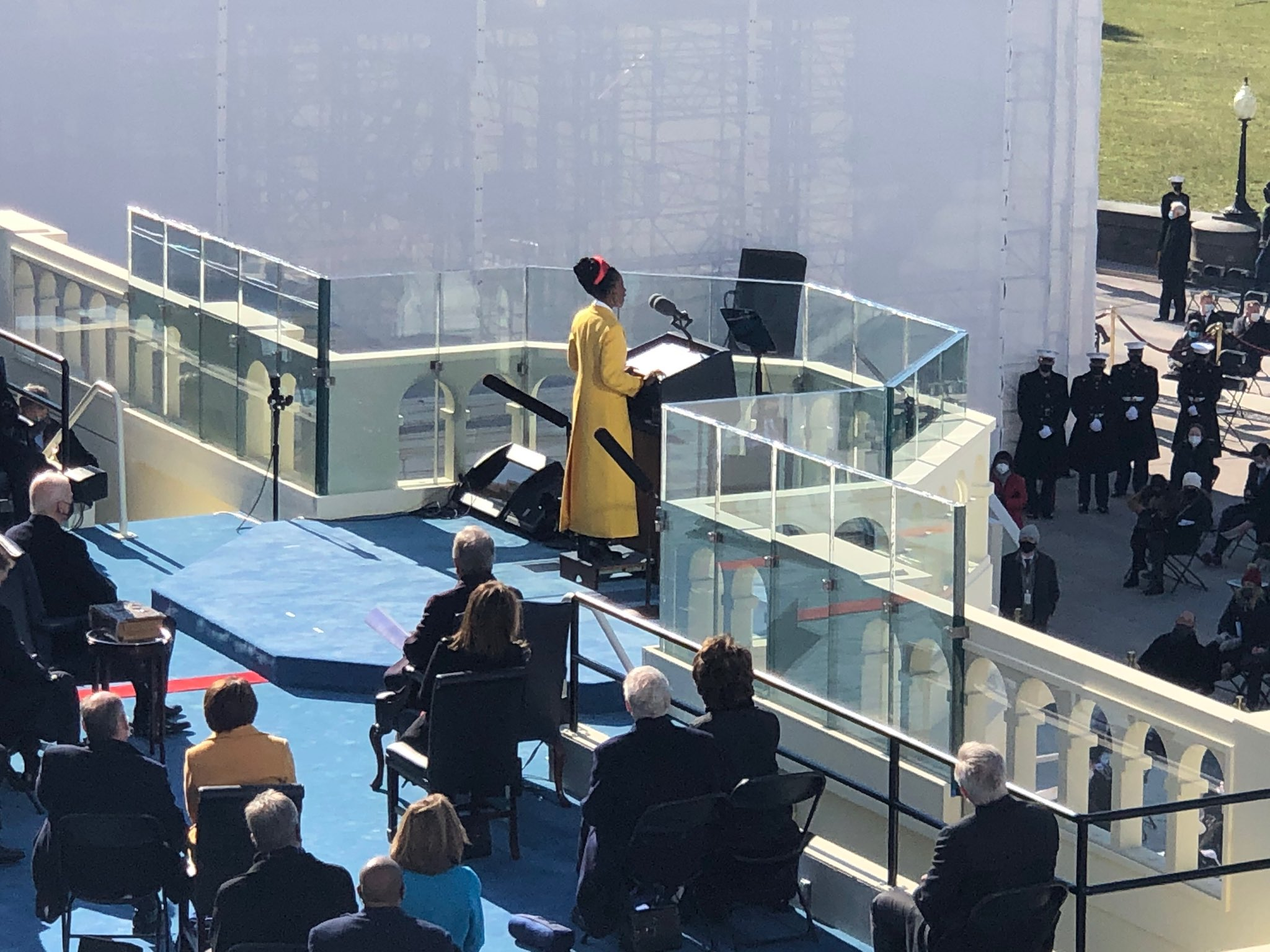
A rear-sight image of Gorman delivering her poem at the inauguration.

Several reporters noted Gorman's outfit, which included jewelry that was given to her by Oprah Winfrey, a yellow coat designed by Miuccia Prada, and a red puff satin headband, also designed by Prada. She sought to honor Angelou by wearing a ring that depicted a caged bird, referencing Angelou's I Know Why the Caged Bird Sings.

== Publication ==
Shortly after the inauguration, Penguin Young Readers announced a publication of 150,000 hardcover copies of the poem in spring 2021, set to begin on April 27. The poem was also included in Gorman's first published collection of poetry, titled The Hill We Climb, which was released by Viking Books for Young Readers in September 2021. The day after the inauguration, Change Sings, a picture book by Gorman then scheduled for publication by Viking in September 2021, and The Hill We Climb were the two best-selling print books at Amazon and Barnes & Noble.

=== Controversies over translation ===
Translators into various languages were divided over the question of who could best translate Gorman's work. Many critics maintained that only a young black woman could properly translate the poem, while others argued that this was impractical, particularly considering the scarcity of competent translators fitting those specifications. Aaron Robertson, a black translator, told The New York Times that "this feels something of a watershed moment". For the poem's translation into various European languages, Gorman and her agent reportedly requested the translators have some experience with spoken word as an art form.

In March 2021, Marieke Lucas Rijneveld was selected to translate The Hill We Climb into Dutch. The decision, which Gorman had approved, was criticized due to Rijneveld's whiteness, and Rijneveld eventually withdrew from the assignment.

Later that month, the Catalan publisher Univers spiked a translation they had commissioned from Víctor Obiols Llandrich. Obiols told AFP that the publisher had said they were "looking for a different profile, which had to be a woman, young, activist and preferably black". He also added: "If I cannot translate a poet because she is a woman, young, black, an American of the 21st century, neither can I translate Homer because I am not a Greek of the eighth century BC. Or could not have translated Shakespeare because I am not a 16th-century Englishman."

The German edition was published by Hoffmann und Campe in a translation by Kübra Gümüşay, Hadija Haruna-Oelker, and Uda Strätling. Neither Gümüşay nor Haruna-Oelker had worked as translators before. The German translation was criticized, with the Austrian newspaper Der Standard deeming it "extremely unsuccessful". The Danish translation by Naiha Khiljee, published by Lindhardt og Ringhof, was also criticized as being "school-like", clichéd, and lacking the original poem's allusions and wordplay.

== Restriction ==
Gorman's poetry collection The Hill We Climb was restricted to an area reserved for middle school students at Bob Graham Education Center in Miami Lakes, Florida in 2023. The restriction was based on a complaint to Miami-Dade County Public Schools that the book contains "hate messages" in the following stanzas:

We've braved the belly of the beast.
We've learned that quiet isn't always peace,
And the norms and notions of what "just is"
Isn't always justice.

And yet the dawn is ours before we knew it.
Somehow, we do it.
Somehow, we've weathered and witnessed
A nation that isn't broken, but simply
unfinished.

Daily Salinas, the mother who requested the removal of the book, also requested the removal of poetry by Langston Hughes and other works. "Advocacy group Miami Against Fascism posted photos of Salinas at rallies with members of Proud Boys and Moms for Liberty, a conservative group that has protested school curriculums that mention LGBTQ rights, critical race theory, and other issues." Salinas denies that she was a member of either group.

== See also ==
- List of United States presidential inaugural poems
- United States presidential inauguration § Poems
