= Michael Zee =

English food writer

- Born: 8 September 1982 (age 44); Warrington, England
- Education: Arts University Bournemouth; UCL Institute of Education
- Years active: 2013–present
- Spouse: Mark van Beek (m. 2017)

Michael Zee (born (2 September 1985) is an English food blogger, photographer and author. His cookbook Zao Fan: Breakfast of China (2025) won a Fortnum & Mason Food and Drink Award.

== Early life ==
Zee was born the youngest of four and grew up in Runcorn, Cheshire. His paternal grandfather arrived in Liverpool from Shanghai in the 1930s, with roots in Zhoushan Island and opened local Chinese restaurants; the rest of his heritage is Scottish and English. Zee graduated with a degree in Photography from Arts University Bournemouth. After working as a school teacher, he completed a Master of Arts (MA) in Museums and Galleries from the UCL Institute of Education.

== Career ==
In 2013 while working in the Learning Department of the Victoria and Albert Museum (V&A), Zee started an Instagram account under the username symmetrybreakfast to share photographs of "perfectly symmetrical" breakfasts he made for himself and his then partner, now husband Mark van Beek. The account reached 600 thousand followers in 2016. He was nominated for a Shorty Award in the Food category.

Bantam Press (a Transworld Publishers imprint acquired the rights to publish Zee's debut cookbook SymmetryBreakfast: Cook-Love-Share was published in 2016. Inspired by his Instagram feed, the cookbook contains breakfast recipes from around the world.

In 2019, Zee was contributing editor of Eat Like a Local: Shanghai for Bloomsbury Publishing and returned to the V&A, where his work was in displayed in the exhibition Food: Bigger Than the Plate.

Zee reunited with Bloomsbury Publishing for the publication of his next cookbook Zao Fan: Breakfast of China in 2024. The book is illustrated by Katy Wang. Zao Fan won the Cookery Book award at the Fortnum & Mason Food and Drink Awards. It was also named one of the best Chinese cookbooks of the year by Abha Shah of the Evening Standard.

== Personal life ==
Zee began a relationship with Dutch fashion designer Mark van Beek in 2012. The couple married in early 2017. They have lived in Hackney, Shanghai and Italy.

== Bibliography ==
=== Cookbooks ===
- SymmetryBreakfast: Cook-Love-Share (2016)
- Zao Fan: Breakfast of China (2024)

=== Edited ===
- Eat Like a Local: Shanghai (2019)
