= Brian T. Field =

American composer (born 1967)

- Born: December 1, 1967 (age 58); United States
- Occupation: Composer

Brian T. Field (born December 1, 1967) is an American composer of music for chamber groups, choirs and orchestras. He is noted for thematically pairing his music with topics of activism and social issues, particularly climate change, gun control and immigration. Field has taught at Columbia University, Seton Hall University, and American University.

== Early life and education ==
Brian Field was raised in Minneapolis, Minnesota and Toledo, Ohio. He began formal musical education with piano studies at age eight, and his first serious compositional efforts at age sixteen. Field pursued his undergraduate degree at Connecticut College under the mentorship of Noel Zahler. His academic journey was marked with numerous accolades including graduating Magna Cum Laude, being inducted into the Phi Beta Kappa Honor Society, and receiving the Rosemary Park Fellowship and the Mahan Music Prize for Highest Attainment in Music.

He earned a M.M. in composition at the Juilliard School in New York, where he was a student of Milton Babbitt, subsequently earning his doctorate in composition as a President's Fellow at Columbia University as a student of Mario Davidovsky and George Edwards. His doctoral composition and analysis was a work for violoncello quartet, Metamorphoses Messianiques.

== Musical Style ==
Field adopts an eclectic fusion in his musical approach, demonstrating a “versatility that is both striking and impressive,” blending lyricism with driving rhythms to create a harmonious confluence of post-romanticism, minimalism, and jazz that are modulated based upon the particular topic of the work.

== Reviews & Recognition ==
First public reviews of Field's work emerged with the release of his String Quartet #1 (2019) on a compilation of string quartets performed by the New York-based Sirius Quartet. Gramophone took note of the work, and wrote that "[Field’s] First Quartet makes me want to hear more. Its four very rhythmic movements are models of concision, real dialogues between the four musicians." The American Record Guide took particular focus on the second, lyrical movement of the quartet, commenting that "Field's Quartet #1 has a true gem of a second movement: here we get that delicious sense of longing, of needing, as the strings climb higher and higher on their fingerboards: almost like they're attempting to touch heaven."

In 2021, Field released a compilation of his vocal music on the Navona label, which attracted additional attention once again from Gramophone, that wrote "Field's music has a winning melodic flow and harmonic translucency that make it easy to appreciate." The bi-monthly Fanfare Magazine further commented that "Field’s versatility is both striking and impressive and stretches tonality to and beyond its limits, but always in a soaring, lyrical manner.” The music monthly The Whole Note noted that the recording is "an important disc, no doubt, often dripping with sardonicism and bitterness, shrouded in the music’s frequent dissonance. Gorgeous songs complemented by great choral and solo singing, however, triumph over these feelings, in a program selected and sequenced with uncommon care, with Field drawing on his consummate musicianship fueled by hopefulness."

== Social Issues & Advocacy ==
As part of the Vocal Works compilation, Field addressed issues of immigration through musical parody of both right- and left-wing extremes in his composition “Let’s Build a Wall!" In interviews he has remarked that “the main challenge we face in this country is extremism in all its forms which leaves great room for commentary and parody. Through the music and reflection, we can form a greater self-awareness of how we all need to consider immigration issues.” The Whole Note commented that through this work "Field shows that he isn’t afraid to wear his emotions on his sleeve, nor does he shrink away from the bitterness of social commentary".

In 2021, Field composed a suite for solo piano on the theme of climate change, dedicated to fellow Juilliard alum Sony Classical artist, Kay Kun Eun Kim. The work, Three Passions for Our Tortured Planet, has become a multi-year global project involving dozens of pianists from around the world to drive awareness of climate change and raise donations for the non-profit Union of Concerned Scientists to support climate policy change. The work has since gone beyond traditional concert settings and commercial recordings, extending to underground night clubs and multimedia amplification across social media platforms.

In April of 2025, Field took on the issue of gun control and announced his collaboration with National Youth Poet Laureate, Amanda Gorman. The work for orchestra and mezzo-soprano, "Everything Hurts," was premiered by the Nashville Symphony and J'Nai Bridges in October of 2025. The work is the first time Gorman's poetry has been set to original music, and is based on her poem "Hymn for the Hurting" which was first published in the New York Times, following the Uvale, Texas school shooting.

== Awards ==
- 2003 First Prize, Shoreline Arts Alliance
- 2003 First Prize, Briar Cliff Choral Music Competition
- 2005 Artist Fellowship, Connecticut Commission for the Arts
- 2018 Vienna International Music Competition for orchestral dance suite Shiva Tandava.
- 2018 Benenti Foundation Recording Prize
- 2018 Alvarez Chamber Orchestra, Mullord Award, for "A Letter from Camp" for soprano and orchestra
- 2018 Third Prize, Busan MARU International Music Festival
- 2018 First Prize, Phinney Ridge Youth Orchestra
- 2019 First Prize, Malta International Composition Competition
- 2019 McKnight Foundation/Minnesota Sinfonia Award
- 2019 Special Mention, Concours de composition Les Musicales du Centre
- 2019 Most Distinguished Musician, Special Mention – IBLA Grand Prize
- 2019 Second Prize, Academia Musica Vienna
- 2020 First Degree Award, Golden Key of Vienna International Music Festival
- 2020 First Prize, Ithaca College Composition Contest
- 2020 Second Prize, New Vienna Symphony International Composer Competition
- 2020 First Prize, Malta International Composition Competition
- 2020 First Prize, Associazione Amici della Musica "Guido Albanese"
- 2020 Second Prize, Franz Schubert Konservatorium
- 2020 Special Mention, ORIENT / OCCIDENT Competition
- 2020 Award of Distinction, Warsaw Wind Ensemble Composition Contest 2020
- 2020 Third Prize, Franz Schubert Konservatorium
- 2020 Most Distinguished Musician – IBLA Grand Prize
- 2021 Honorable Mention, 7° Concorso di Composizione “Città di Albenga”
- 2021 Second Prize, Golden Key of Vienna International Music Festival
- 2021 First Prize & Special Prize, Franz Schubert Konservatorium
- 2021 Second Prize, Voice2Choir, Diaphonia Edizioni
- 2021 Second Place, VIII International Piano Competition Smederev
- 2021 Second Prize, 21st Century Talents Music Competition, Ottawa, Canada
- 2021 Third Prize, Franz Schubert Konservatorium
- 2021 Grand Prize, International Youth Music Competitions
- 2021 First Prize & Audience Prize, Rocky Mountain Composition Summer Festival
- 2021 First Prize, Vienna Academia Musica, 2nd International Music Competition
- 2021 Silver Medal, Global Music Awards
- 2021 First Prize, Pianos Créneau Composition Prize
- 2021 First Prize, ChoralArt Carol Contest
- 2021 Second Prize, 21st Century Talents Composition Competition
- 2021 Second Prize, Associazione Cultura e Musica - G. Curci’s International Competition “Città di Barletta”
- 2021 Second Prize, European Composer Competition, jazz/big band section
- 2021 First Prize & Audience Prize, Royal Sound Music Composition
- 2021 Platinum Award, LIT Talent Awards
- 2021 First Prize, Red Maple Music Competition
- 2021 First Prize, Constellation: Power of Music
- 2021 Special Mention, Amsonia International Composition Contest 2021
- 2021 First Prize & Audience Prize, Royal Sound Music New Year's Competition
- 2021 Second Prize & Audience Prize, 21st Century Talents New Year's Composition Competition
- 2021 First Prize & Audience Prize, Rocky Mountain Music Competition New Year's Competition
- 2021 Grand Prize, Red Maple Music Competition New Year's Competition
- 2021 Third Prize, Vienna Academia Musica
- 2021 Gold Medal, Trinity International Music Competition
- 2021 Silver Medal, International Youth Music Awards, Artist of the Year
- 2022 First Prize, Golden Key of Vienna International Music Festival
- 2022 Silver Medal, Global Music Awards
- 2022 First Prize, VIII Odin International Music Competition
- 2022 Special Mention, London Classical Music Competition
- 2022 First Prize, XI Amigdala International Music Competition memorial "Giuseppe Raciti"
- 2022 Third Prize, Franz Schubert Konservatorium
- 2022 Platinum Award, 2 Gold Awards, LIT Talent Awards
- 2022 Third Prize, MaestrosVision International Composition Competition
- 2022 Grand Prize, Vivaldi International Music Competition
- 2022 Second Prize, Franz Schubert Music Conservatory
- 2022 Second Prize, 32nd International Music Competition "Città di Barletta"
- 2022 Gold Medal, 2022 Quebec Music Competition
- 2022 Special Prize, Third Prize, Busan MARU International Music Festival
- 2022 First Prize, Malta International Composition Competition
- 2023 First Prize, Golden Key of Vienna International Music Festival
- 2023 First Absolute Prize, 10th Wanda Landowska International Harpsichord Competition

== Discography ==
- Tableaux Tartroniques, Album: Contemporary Chamber Music, RMN Classical, release date, April 26, 2019
- String Quartet #1, Album: Playing on the Edge, Navona Records, release date, September 13, 2019
- A Letter from Camp, Album: Dimensions Vol. 2, Navona Records, release date, October 11, 2019
- From the Clash of Race and Creed, Album: Orchestral Masters Vol. 6, Ablaze Records, release date, October 18, 2019
- Κατήχηση, Album: AAKATI, Nous Records, release date, August 15, 2020
- Brian Field: Choral and Orchestral Works, RMN Classical, release date, October 15, 2020
- Funk-E, Album: Single, Funk-E, Olim Music, release date, October 30, 2020
- Brian Field, Symphonic Works, Orpheus Classical, release date, January 8, 2021
- Funk & Fire, Olim Music, release date February 15, 2021
- Brian Field - Early Works, Olim Music, release date April 6, 2021
- Brian Field - String Play, Olim Music, release date April 15, 2021
- From the Clash of Race and Creed, Album: Single, Olim Music, release date April 19, 2021
- Senex puerum portabat, Album: Single, Olim Music, release date April 26, 2021
- String Quartet #1, Album: New Music for String Quartet Vol 3, Phasma Music, release date, May 28, 2021
- La coquette heureuse, Album: YODH, Phasma Music, release date, May 28, 2021
- Brian Field - Vocal Works, Navona Records, release date, August 13, 2021
- Kaleidoscope, Album: Single, Olim Music, release date, March 14, 2022
- Pas de deux, Lamedh. Iwona Glinka, flute; Yannis Samprovalakis, bass clarinet. Phasma Music, release date April 1, 2022
- Five, Four by Four, Windswept, Vol 2. Modern Chamber Music for Winds. New London Chamber Ensemble. Navona Records, release date: June 24, 2022
- "Glaciers" from Three Passions for our Tortured Planet, Luminescence. Katya Kramer-Lapin, piano. Oclassica Records, release date, April 22, 2022
- Three Passions for our Tortured Planet, Irene Cantos, piano; Novus Promusica, release date, March 10, 2023
- Three Passions for our Tortured Planet, Vasilisa Bogorodskya, piano; Olim Music, release date, May 6, 2023
- "...and all that jazz", A Grand Journey Vol 2, Alexandr Kislitsyn violin, Ovidiu Marinescu cello. Navona Records, release date: August 11, 2023
