= Call Us What We Carry =

2021 poetry collection by Amanda Gorman

- Author: Amanda Gorman
- Language: English
- Genre: Poetry
- Publisher: Viking Press
- Publication date: December 7, 2021
- Media type: Print
- ISBN: 9780593465066

Call Us What We Carry is a poetry collection by Amanda Gorman, published December 7, 2021, by Viking Press. The book landed the first position on the New York Times Best Seller List. It was translated into Spanish by Nuria Barrios in 2023.

== Summary ==
The book covers contemporary topics from the news, including the COVID-19 pandemic and the police shootings of Breonna Taylor and George Floyd. Some of the poems are visual poems. The book's poetry has nautical themes, including it first lines about a message in a bottle and the ship Essex that was sunk by a sperm whale. The book ends with "The Hill We Climb", the poem that Gorman recited at the inauguration of Joe Biden.

== Audiobook ==
An accompanying audiobook version of Call Us What We Carry, read by Gorman, was released on December 7, 2021, by Penguin Random House's audio publishing division. The audiobook earned Gorman a nomination at the 65th Annual Grammy Awards in the newly created Best Spoken Word Poetry Album category.

== Reception ==
Call Us What We Carry landed the first position on the New York Times Best Seller List and is an IndieBound best seller.

The book received starred reviews from Kirkus, as well as positive reviews from New York Times Book Review, The Washington Post, NPR, The Associated Press, Oprah Magazine, The Guardian, Tatler, and Publishers Weekly.
