= Get Lit =

American poetry organization

Get Lit — Words Ignite
- Founded: 2006; 20 years ago
- Founder: Diane Luby Lane
- Type: Nonprofit organization
- Location: Los Angeles, California, U.S.
- Website: www.getlit.org

Get Lit — Words Ignite is an American non-profit organization, based in Los Angeles. Founded in 2006 by author and educator Diane Luby Lane, Get Lit works to increase literacy rates and empower youth and communities through poetry and visual media.

== History ==
Get Lit – Words Ignite was founded in 2006 in Los Angeles by Diane Luby Lane. The inspiration for Get Lit began with a solo slam poetry show that Lane toured with Jimmy Santiago Baca, in venues ranging from high schools and universities to prisons. After teachers and students responded with requests for poetry in their classrooms, Lane developed a curriculum to engage marginalized youth through spoken word. Get Lit began as a project of Community Partners, before incorporating as a 501(c)(3) in 2009.

In 2023, the Library of Congress recognized Get Lit as one of fifteen Literacy Best Practice Honorees. That same year, the Greater Los Angeles Chapter of the Association of Fundraising Professionals named Get Lit an Outstanding Nonprofit Organization. Get Lit received a gift of more than one million dollars from philanthropist MacKenzie Scott in 2024.

== Activities ==
Every year since 2012, Get Lit has hosted a 3-day Classic Slam poetry competition for students to compete by performing classic poems alongside their own spoken word responses, with 2020 and 2021 being online due to the COVID-19 pandemic. In 2020, 240 students competed, watched by 34,630 people via livestream.

In 2014, Get Lit poets Belissa Escobedo, Rhiannon McGavin, and Zariya Allen were featured on The Queen Latifah Show. In 2016, founder Diane Luby Lane and nineteen poets from the organization wrote the Nautilus Award-winning book Get Lit Rising.

In 2018, the Get Lit Players were designated Peace Day Ambassadors by the United Nations and performed their poetry for world leaders at the U.N. 73rd General Assembly as part of the global movement "United Voices for Peace." They partnered with Toms Shoes to distribute a poetry and art magazine from the event to more than 15,000 youth across the United States. In March of that same year, videos by Get Lit poets were broadcast for the March For Our Lives rally in Washington, D.C., opening for presenters including Lin-Manuel Miranda and X González.

Twenty-seven Get Lit poets wrote and starred in the feature film Summertime, directed by Carlos Lopez Estrada, which premiered at the Sundance Film Festival in 2020. It was released to theaters nationwide in the summer of 2021.

In 2022, the ADL Stand Up Award-winning documentary film "Our Words Collide" premiered at the Santa Barbara International Film Festival, featuring five poets from the Get Lit program. In January of that same year, Get Lit announced a partnership with the Writers Guild Foundation to allow for mentoring of young storytellers by professional screenwriters. Later, in May, Get Lit founder, Diane Luby Lane and two Get Lit poets were featured on The Kelly Clarkson Show.

== See also ==
- Arts in education
- Poetry slam
- Spoken word
