= Katy Wang =

British animation director and illustrator

- Born: Katy Jin Wang; February 1995 (age 31)
- Education: Kingston University
- Website: katywang.co.uk

Katy Wang (born 1995) is a British illustrator and animation director. She co-directed the Netflix series Headspace Guide to Meditation, illustrated Michael Zee's book Zao Fan (2024), and worked on the music videos for Toto Bona Lokua and Tom Rosenthal.

Her short film Mind the Gap (2015) won several festival awards and she was named It's Nice That's 2017 "Graduate of the Year". She was part of the team that produced the Ma Mama (2018) music video for the singer Jain, which won Gold at the Kinsale Shark Awards, and she also co-produced the animated film, The Peace of Wild Things (2020) which won a Ron Kovic Peace Prize.

== Early life and education ==
Katy Jin Wang was born in February 1995 and grew up in Oxfordshire, England. She studied illustration and animation at Kingston School of Art. During her studies, she created the short film Mind the Gap (2015), which screened at international festivals and won Best Experimental Animation at the Tofuzi Festival and Best Abstract Experimental Animation at the Tindirindis Festival.

Wang graduated from Kingston School of Art with a Bachelor of Arts degree in 2017. The same year, her graduation film Contact, was screened at a number of film festivals. Wang was also named "Graduate of the Year" by the arts and design publication It's Nice That.

== Professional art career ==
In September 2017, Wang signed with Partizan production company. Later in the year, she served on the animation team of the music video "Ma Mama" by the French group Toto Bona Lokua. "Ma Mama" was nominated for Best Animation in a Video at the 2018 UK Music Video Awards.

She also created a short animation to accompany Yrsa Daley-Ward's memoir The Terrible for Penguin Books.

In 2018, Wang collaborated with musician Tom Rosenthal to animate the music videos for the songs "Forests" and "Dinosaurs in Love" by Fenn Rosenthal. That year, she also directed An Invisible Threat, a short film in collaboration with Girl Effect and Nutrition International. In 2019, she joined the animation studio Blinkink as a director.

Wang's style blends of analogue and digital media, often incorporating hand-painted textures, ink, and charcoal drawings into her digital animations. Wang frequent collaborates with Gabriel Greenough. Together, they have produced commercial projects for clients including Burberry, Epson and Rimowa. In 2021, Wang and Greenough directed the Netflix and Vox docuseries Headspace Guide to Meditation.

In 2022, Wang was one of 40 artists to take part in an Instagram digital exhibition What Does Home Taste Like? highlighting relationship of food and identity in the Chinese diaspora. In 2024, Wang illustrated Michael Zee's book Zao Fan (2024) and contributed a section to Coldplay's video for "ALiEN HiTS / ALiEN RADiO".

=== Teaching ===
Wang has been a visiting lecturer and guest speaker at a number of UK arts institutions, including Kingston School of Art, University of the Arts London, the University for the Creative Arts, Norwich University of the Arts, and the National Film and Television School.

== Selected works ==
- Mind the Gap (2015) – Student short film created at Kingston School of Art. Awarded at Tofuzi and Tindirindis Festivals.
- Contact (2017) – Graduation film. Honoured by It's Nice That and won a Motion Award in the Student Group Project category.
- Ma Mama (2018) – Music video for the band Jain. It received a Vimeo Staff Pick, was nominated at the UK Music Video Awards, and won a Gold Kinsale Shark award.
- Outer Monologue (2019) – Short animated film featuring actress Joy Bryant.
- The Peace of Wild Things (2020) – An animated adaptation of a Wendell Berry poem, created with illustrator Charlotte Ager for the On Being Project. The film won the Ron Kovic Peace Prize.
- Headspace Guide to Meditation (2021) – Animated docuseries for Netflix. Wang is credited as a director.
- Epson Climate Reality Animation (2023) – A mixed-media animation co-directed with Gabriel Greenough, commissioned to visualise Gen Z's sentiments on climate change.
