= Amanda Gorman =

American poet and activist (born 1998)

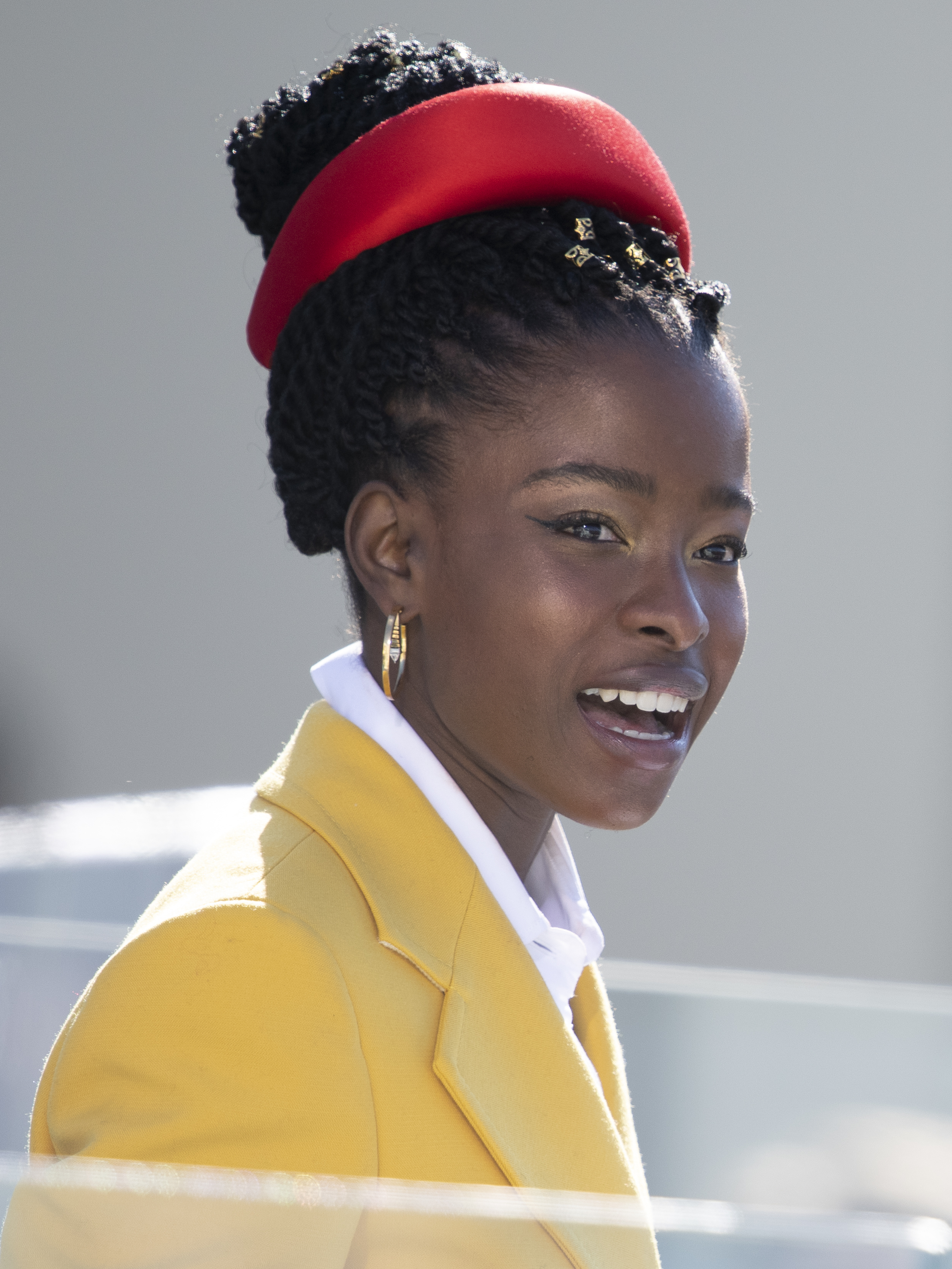
- Gorman in 2021 at the inauguration of Joe Biden delivering "The Hill We Climb"
- Born: March 7, 1998 (age 28); Los Angeles, California, U.S.
- Education: Harvard University (BA)
- Occupations: Poet; activist
- Agents: IMG Models (fashion & beauty); Writers House (literary); Gang, Tyre, Ramer, Brown and Passman (legal)
- Notable work: "The Hill We Climb"

National Youth Poet Laureate
- In office April 2017 – April 2018
- Preceded by: Inaugural holder
- Succeeded by: Patricia Frazier Shay

Los Angeles Youth Poet Laureate
- In office 2014–2015
- Preceded by: Inaugural holder
- Succeeded by: Rhiannon McGavin
- Website: www.theamandagorman.com

Amanda S. C. Gorman (born March 7, 1998) is an American poet, activist, and model. Her work focuses on issues of oppression, feminism, race, marginalization, and the African diaspora. Gorman was the first person to be named National Youth Poet Laureate. She published the poetry book The One for Whom Food Is Not Enough in 2015. She rose to fame in 2021 for writing and delivering her poem "The Hill We Climb" at the inauguration of Joe Biden.

Gorman was highlighted in Time magazine's 100 Next list under the category of "Phenoms", with a profile written by Lin-Manuel Miranda. That same month, Gorman became the first poet to perform at the Super Bowl, when she delivered her poem "Chorus of the Captains" at Super Bowl LV.

== Early life and education ==
Born in Los Angeles, California, Gorman was raised by her single mother, Joan Wicks, a 6th-grade English teacher in Watts, with her two siblings. Her twin sister, Gabrielle, is an activist and filmmaker. Gorman has said she grew up in an environment with limited television access.

Gorman has an auditory processing disorder and is hypersensitive to sound. She also had a speech impediment during childhood. Gorman participated in speech therapy during her childhood and Elida Kocharian of The Harvard Crimson wrote in 2018, "Gorman doesn't view her speech impediment as a crutch—rather, she sees it as a gift and a strength." Gorman told The Harvard Gazette in 2018, "I always saw it as a strength because since I was experiencing these obstacles in terms of my auditory and vocal skills, I became really good at reading and writing. I realized that at a young age when I was reciting the Marianne Deborah Williamson quote that 'Our deepest fear is not that we are inadequate, our deepest fear is that we are powerful beyond measure' to my mom." In 2021, Gorman told CBS This Morning co-host Anthony Mason that she used songs as a form of speech therapy, and explained that "My favorite thing to practice was the song 'Aaron Burr, Sir', from Hamilton because it is jam-packed with R's. And I said, 'if I can keep up with Leslie in this track, then I am on my way to being able to say this R in a poem."

Gorman attended New Roads, a private school in Santa Monica, for grades K–12. As a senior, she received a Milken Family Foundation college scholarship. She studied sociology at Harvard College, graduating cum laude in 2020 as a member of Phi Beta Kappa. In 2019, Gorman spent a semester studying in Madrid, Spain, supported by IES Abroad.

== Career ==
=== Beginnings and recognition (2014–2020) ===
Gorman's art and activism are centered on issues of feminism, marginalization, and race, specifically the African diaspora. She has said she was inspired to become a youth delegate for the United Nations in 2013 after watching a speech by Pakistani Nobel Prize laureate Malala Yousafzai. Gorman was chosen as the first youth poet laureate of Los Angeles in 2014. In 2014 it was reported that Gorman was "editing the first draft of a novel the 16‑year‑old has been writing over the last two years." She published the poetry book The One for Whom Food Is Not Enough in 2015.

In 2016, Gorman founded the nonprofit organization One Pen One Page, a youth writing and leadership program. In 2017, she became the first author to be featured on XQ Institute's Book of the Month, a monthly giveaway to share inspiring Gen Z's favorite books. She wrote a tribute for black athletes for Nike and has a book deal with Viking Children's Books to write two children's picture books.

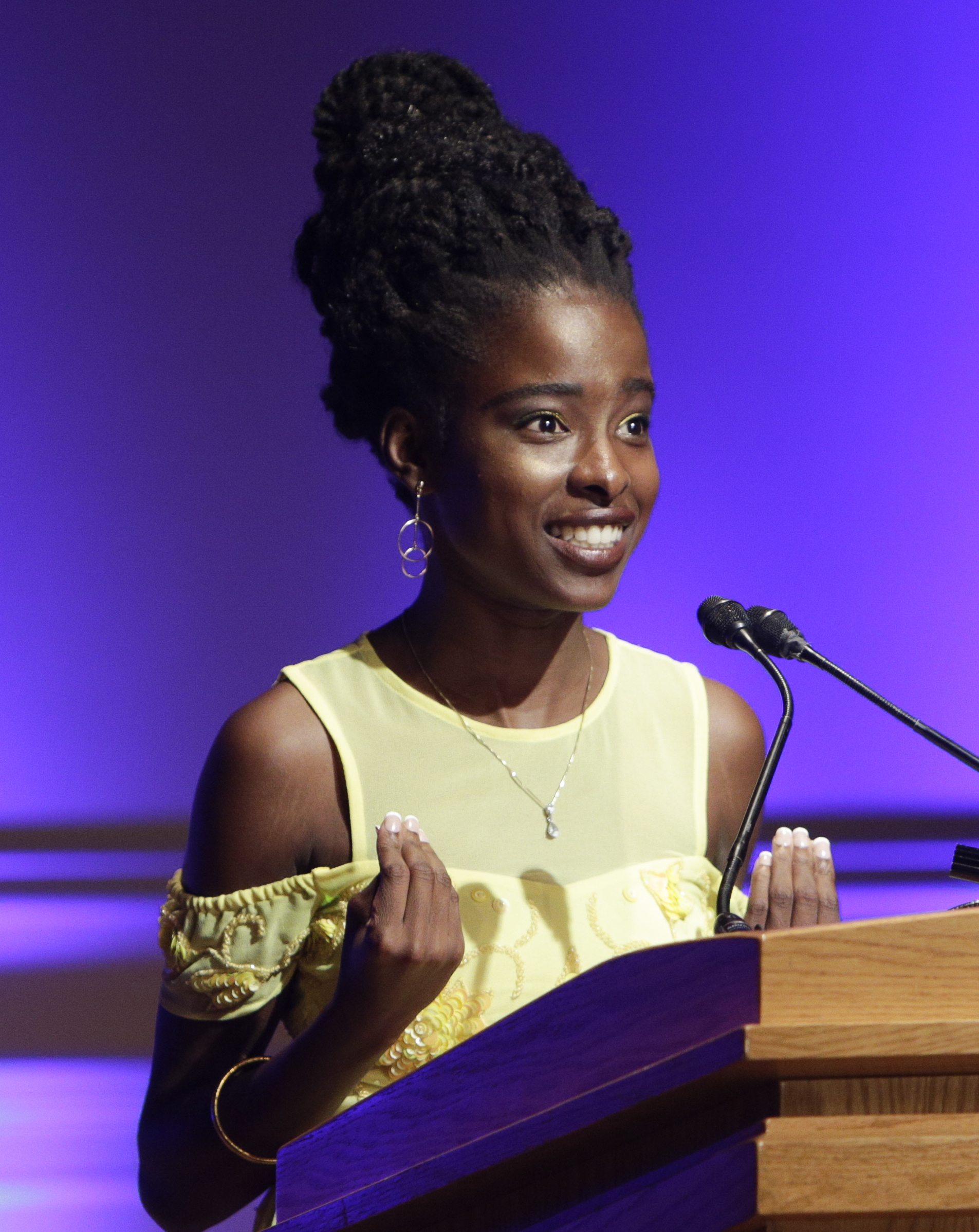
Gorman reading her poem "An American Lyric" in 2017

In 2017, Gorman became the first youth poet to open the literary season for the Library of Congress, and she has read her poetry on MTV. She wrote "In This Place: An American Lyric" for her September 2017 performance at the Library of Congress, which commemorated the inauguration of Tracy K. Smith as Poet Laureate of the United States. The Morgan Library and Museum acquired her poem "In This Place (An American Lyric)" and displayed it in 2018 near works by Elizabeth Bishop.

While at Harvard, Gorman became the first person to be named National Youth Poet Laureate in April 2017. She was chosen from five finalists. In 2017, Gorman won a $10,000 grant from media company OZY in the annual OZY Genius Awards through which 10 college students are given "the opportunity to pursue their outstanding ideas and envisioned innovations".

In 2017, Gorman said she intends to run for president in 2036, and she has subsequently often repeated this hope. On being selected as one of Glamour magazine's 2018 "College Women of the Year", she said: "Seeing the ways that I as a young black woman can inspire people is something I want to continue in politics. I don't want to just speak works; I want to turn them into realities and actions." After she read her poem "The Hill We Climb" at President Joe Biden's inauguration in 2021, Hillary Clinton tweeted her support for Gorman's 2036 aspiration.

In 2019, Gorman was chosen as one of The Root magazine's "Young Futurists", an annual list of "the 25 best and brightest young African-Americans who excel in the fields of social justice and activism, arts and culture, enterprise and corporate innovation, science and technology and green innovation". She expressed support for abortion rights and Roe v. Wade in a 2019 NowThis News video which included a pro-choice poem.

In May 2020, Gorman appeared in an episode of the web series Some Good News hosted by John Krasinski, where she had the opportunity to virtually meet Oprah Winfrey and issued a virtual commencement speech to those who could not attend commencements due to the COVID-19 pandemic in the U.S. In 2020, Gorman presented "Earthrise", a poem focused on the climate crisis.

=== Inauguration poem and acclaim (2021–present) ===
Gorman read her poem "The Hill We Climb" at the inauguration of Joe Biden on January 20, 2021, and is the youngest poet to read at a presidential inauguration in United States history. Jill Biden recommended her for the inauguration. After January 6, 2021, Gorman amended her poem's wording to address the storming of the United States Capitol. During the week before the inauguration, she told The Washington Post book critic Ron Charles, "My hope is that my poem will represent a moment of unity for our country" and "with my words, I'll be able to speak to a new chapter and era for our nation."

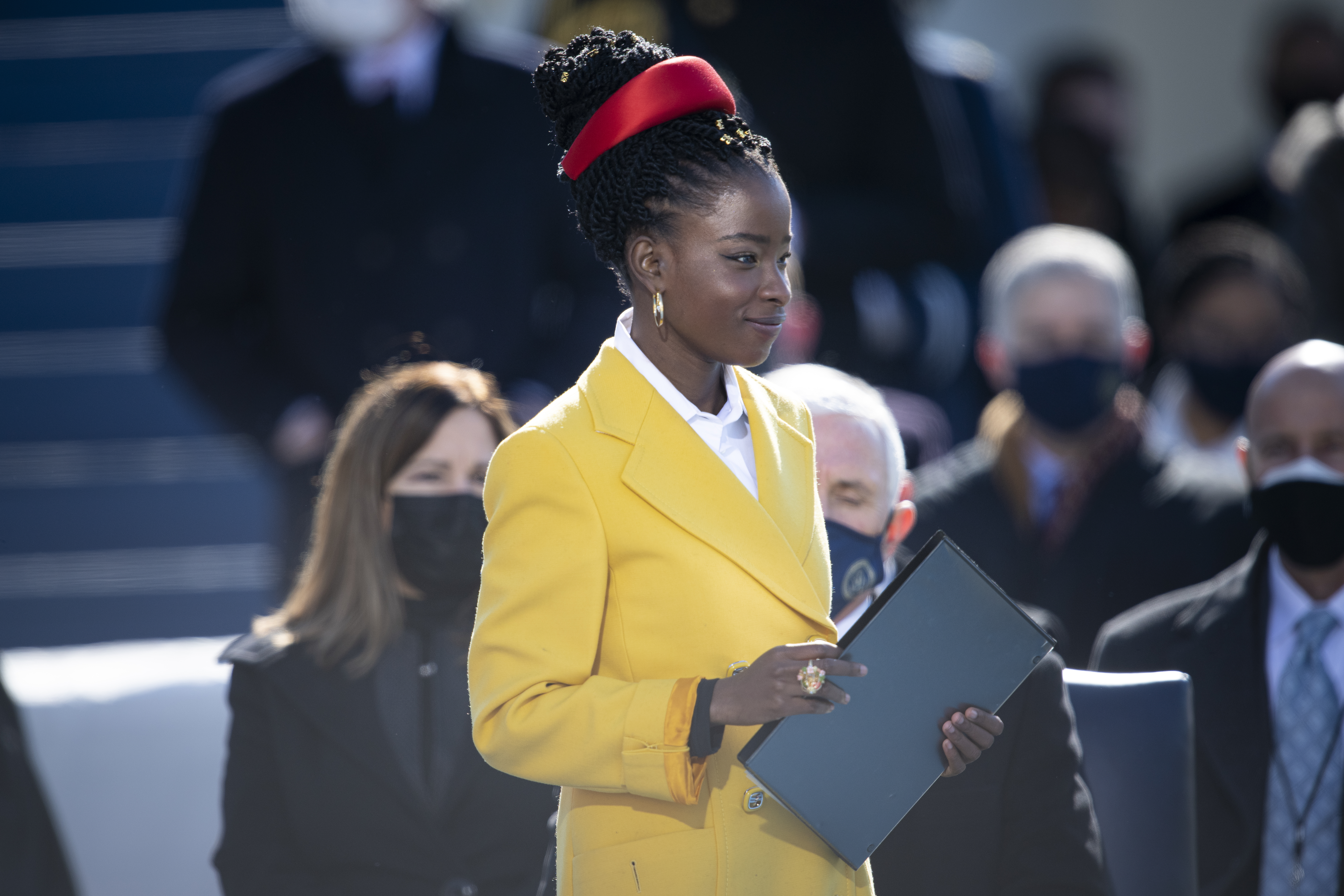
Gorman before reading "The Hill We Climb" at the inauguration of Joe Biden in 2021

Before her performance, Gorman told CBS This Morning co-host Anthony Mason: "One of the preparations that I do always whenever I perform is I say a mantra to myself, which is 'I'm the daughter of black writers. We're descended from freedom fighters who broke through chains and changed the world. They call me.' And that is the way in which I prepare myself for the duty that needs to get done." Soon after Gorman's performance at the inauguration, her two upcoming books, the poetry collection The Hill We Climb and a project for youth, Change Sings: A Children's Anthem – both scheduled for release in September 2021 – were at the top of Amazon's bestseller list. A book version of the poem "The Hill We Climb" was published in March 2021, with a foreword by Oprah Winfrey, and debuted at No. 1 on several bestseller lists, including The New York Times adult fiction and USA Today. First printings of one million copies were announced for each of Gorman's three upcoming books.

In February 2021 the Dutch writer Marieke Lucas Rijneveld, winner of the 2020 International Booker Prize, who had been chosen to translate Gorman's poem, stepped down from the assignment following criticism that the publisher had chosen a white translator. As noted by the BBC, Rijneveld's decision has "heightened the debate in the Netherlands over the ethics of translation and underlined Gorman's original sentiments of the hills that 'all other black girls' must climb." In March 2021, it was reported that the Spanish publisher Univers after hiring writer Victor Obiols to translate Gorman's poem into Catalan had relieved him of the commission after his translation was delivered and were seeking a replacement translator; as Obiols stated: "They did not question my abilities, but they were looking for a different profile, which had to be a woman, young, activist and preferably black." The request was said to have originated with the US group Viking Books. Three translators – Kübra Gümüşay, Hadija Haruna-Oelker and Uda Strätling – worked together on the poem's German edition.

In December 2021, Amanda Gorman released her poetry collection, Call Us What We Carry, published by Viking Books. The collection received critical acclaim for its exploration of themes such as identity, resilience, and the human experience.

IMG Models and its parent company WME signed Gorman for representation in fashion, beauty, and talent endorsements. She is represented in the publishing industry by Writers House and by the Gang, Tyre, Ramer, Brown and Passman law firm. Gorman was commissioned to compose an original poem to be recited at Super Bowl LV's pregame ceremony on February 7, 2021, as an introduction to the three honorary captains who would preside over the coin toss. The Washington Post reported that the honorary captains were essential workers "James Martin, a U.S. Marine veteran; Trimaine Davis, an educator; and Suzie Dorner, an ICU nurse manager", and that Gorman delivered the poem in their honor in a recorded video. In advance of presenting her new piece, titled "Chorus of the Captains", Gorman said: "Poetry at the Super Bowl is a feat for art and our country, because it means we're thinking imaginatively about human connection even when we feel siloed."

Gorman made the cover of Time magazine's February 2021 issue. In March 2021, Gorman said she was racially profiled by a security guard near her home, and tweeted afterwards, "He left, no apology. This is the reality of black girls: One day you're called an icon, the next day, a threat." She later tweeted, "In a sense, he was right. I AM A THREAT: a threat to injustice, to inequality, to ignorance. Anyone who speaks the truth and walks with hope is an obvious and fatal danger to the powers that be. A threat and proud."

Gorman, who was photographed by Annie Leibovitz for the cover-story of the May edition of Vogue – the first poet ever to have been thus featured by the magazine – has said she has turned down $17 million in offers for endorsements that did not "speak to" her. In September 2021, it was announced that Gorman would become the first Estée Lauder "Global Changemaker", as a representative of the brand in ad campaigns and speaking events, in addition to work with the company's grantmaking program to promote literacy for girls and women. On September 13, 2021, she co-hosted the Met Gala, alongside actor Timothée Chalamet, singer Billie Eilish, and tennis player Naomi Osaka.

In the wake of the May 2022 Robb Elementary School shooting in Uvalde, Texas, Gorman published a short poem on Twitter and encouraged action to promote gun safety, as well as penning the poem, "Hymn for the Hurting". This poem was set to music by Brian Field under the title "Everything Hurts", and premiered by the Nashville Symphony in October 2025, with the multi-Grammy winning vocalist J'Nai Bridges. She continued to express her support for Roe v. Wade and abortion rights in a poem posted on Twitter on June 24, 2022, which includes the line, "We will not let Roe v. Wade slowly fade."

Access to "The Hill We Climb" was restricted at the Bob Graham Education Center in Miami Lakes, Florida, in 2023 based on a filed complaint. In response, Gorman wrote: "Robbing children of the chance to find their voices in literature is a violation of their right to free thought and free speech."

Gorman was a speaker at the 2024 Democratic National Convention.

In 2025, Gorman cameoed in Disney's Zootopia 2 as Deerdra Bambino, a deer news reporter.

== Influences ==
Gorman has spoken of her early attempts at writing being "very Anne of Green Gables", until she discovered the work of Toni Morrison in middle school: "I realized then that stories could actually be about people who look like me." Observer.com reported in 2019: "It was in high school that she eventually read the poetry of other black women such as Audre Lorde and Phillis Wheatley, and started writing poems that commented on social justice issues such as intersectional feminism and race." Taking a multi disciplined view to self-expression, Gorman has spoken of the connection between fashion and poetry; in 2019, Vogue magazine noted that Gorman drew inspiration "from icons such as Maya Angelou, the Duchess of Sussex, and Michelle Obama", saying: "Fashion brings a distinct visual aesthetic to language. When I'm performing onstage, I'm not just thinking about my clothing, but what my Wakanda Forever T-shirt and yellow skirt is saying about my identity as a poet."

== Personal life ==
Gorman is a member of St. Brigid Catholic Church in Los Angeles.

== Honors and recognition ==
- 2014: Chosen as inaugural youth poet laureate of Los Angeles
- 2017: Chosen as National Youth Poet Laureate
- 2017: Ozy Genius Award
- 2018: Named one of Glamour magazine's College Women of the Year
- 2018: Presented a poem at Lawrence Bacow's inauguration as president of Harvard University
- 2019: Named on The Root's "Young Futurists" list
- 2021: Selected to read at the inauguration of Joe Biden, becoming the youngest poet ever to read at a US presidential inauguration
- 2021: Named in the Time 100 Next list in the category "Phenoms"
- 2021: Winner Goodreads Choice Awards – Best Poetry for The Hill We Climb
- 2022: A new genus of alga was named after Gorman, following the discovery of its type species, Gormaniella terricola, in Tompkins County, New York.
- 2022: Winner Goodreads Choice Awards – Best Poetry for Call Us What We Carry
- 2022: Winner Children's and Family Emmy Award for Outstanding Short Form Program – We the People
- 2023: Nominated for Best Spoken Word Poetry Album at the 65th Annual Grammy Awards for Call Us What We Carry.
- 2023: Elected to membership in the American Antiquarian Society.

== Bibliography ==
=== Books ===
- The One for Whom Food Is Not Enough. Urban Word LA. 2015. ISBN 978-0-9900122-9-0.
- Taylor, Keren, ed. (2013). "Candy Cane"; "Poetry Is". You are here : the WriteGirl journey. Los Angeles: WriteGirl Publications. pp. 210, 281. ISBN 978-0-98370812-4. OCLC 868918187.
- The Hill We Climb: Poems. Viking Books for Young Readers. 2021. ISBN 978-0-593-46506-6. OCLC 1232185776.
- The Hill We Climb: An Inaugural Poem for the Country. Viking Books for Young Readers. 2021. ISBN 978-0-593-46527-1. OCLC 1232234825.
- Change Sings: A Children's Anthem. Viking Books for Young Readers. 2021. ISBN 978-0-593-20322-4. OCLC 1232149089.
- Call Us What We Carry. Viking Books. 2021. ISBN 978-0593465066.
- Something, Someday. Viking Books for Young Readers. 2023. ISBN 9780593203255. OCLC 1380856566.

=== Audiobooks ===
- Change Sings: A Children's Anthem, 2021, Audible (ISBN 0593203224, 978-0-593-20322-4). 10 mins.
- The Hill We Climb and Other Poems, 2021, Audible (ISBN 059346527X, 978-0593465271). 1 hr.

=== Articles ===
- "How Poetry Gave Me a Voice". November 21, 2014. The Huffington Post. ISSN 2369-3452.
- "Touching a Diverse Audience: A Conversation With Author Sharon G. Flake". January 30, 2015. The Huffington Post. ISSN 2369-3452.
- "Meet Laya DeLeon Hayes, Voice Of Doc McStuffins". August 9, 2016. The Huffington Post. ISSN 2369-3452.
- "Poetry, Purpose, and Path: An Interview with Los Angeles Poet Laureate Luis Rodriquez [sic]". HuffPost. Interviewed by Gorman, Amanda. New York. August 9, 2016. OCLC 1203304694. (Note: "Rodriguez", not "Rodriquez", is the correct spelling of Luis J. Rodriguez's surname)
- "Native People Are Taking Center Stage. Finally.". November 17, 2018. The New York Times. ISSN 0362-4331.
- "I'm Not Here to Answer Your Black History Month Questions". February 13, 2019. The New York Times. ISSN 0362-4331.
