= Nuria Barrios =

Spanish writer

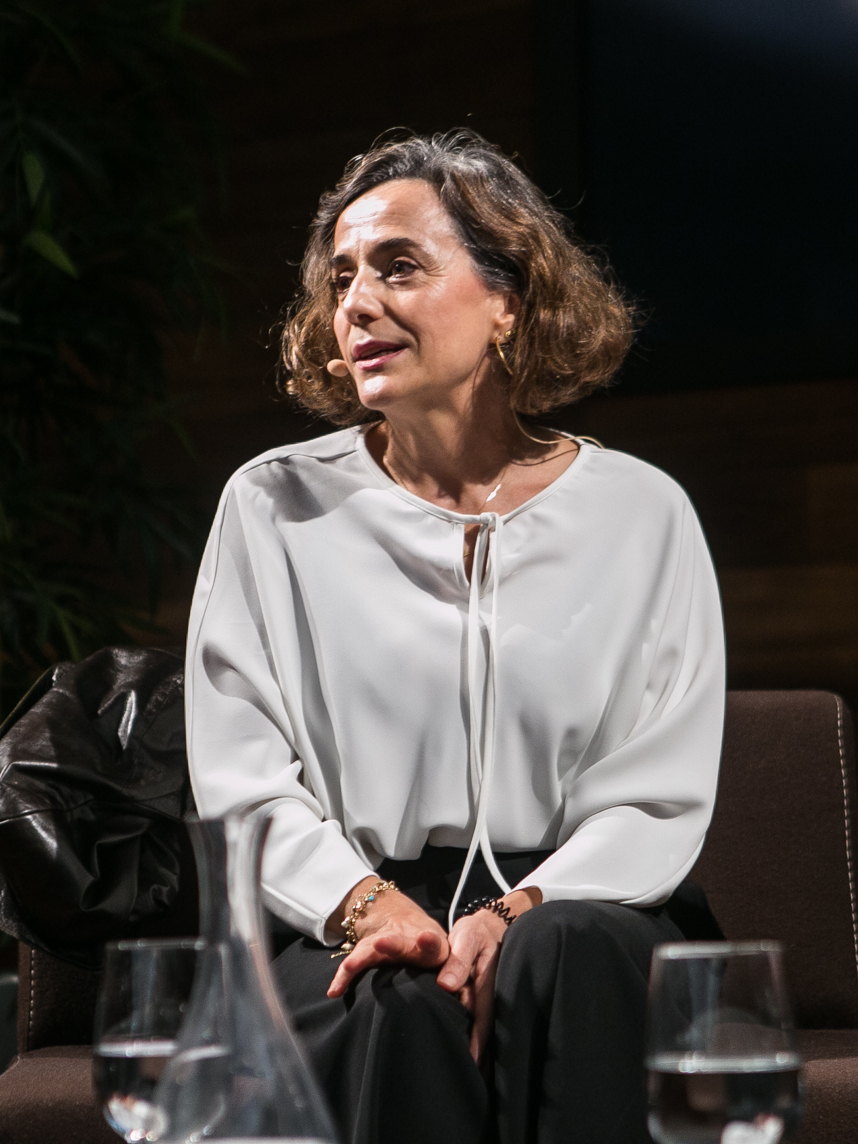
Nuria Barrios (2017).

Nuria Barrios, born in Madrid, is a writer and translator. She has a PhD in Philosophy from the Complutense University of Madrid and a Master's degree in Journalism from the El País-Autonomous University of Madrid School of Journalism. She has translated into Spanish the Irish novelist John Banville, as well as his heteronym Benjamin Black, James Joyce and the American writer Amanda Gorman. She teaches classes for the Literary Creation Master’s program at the International University of Valencia and directs a workshop on myths and literature at the Clara Obligado School of Creative Writing. She is a columnist for the newspaper El País.

== Biography ==
She is author of the essay La impostora (Cuaderno de traducción de una escritora), which won the Málaga Essay Prize; of the novels Todo arde and El alfabeto de los pájaros; of the short story collections Amores patológicos, Ocho centímetros, El zoo sentimental and Balearia; and of the poetry books La luz de la dinamo, winner of the Machado Brothers Ibero-American Poetry Prize; Nostalgia de Odiseo and El hilo de agua, winner of the Ateneo of Sevilla Prize.

As a short story writer she is featured in numerous anthologies, including: Páginas amarillas, Vidas de mujer, Cuentos de mujeres solas, Pequeñas resistencias, Tu nombre flotando en el adiós, Comedias de Shakespeare, Cuentos breves de ir y venir, Hombres (y algunas mujeres) and Tsunami, miradas feministas.

She has translated John Banville/Benjamin Black, James Joyce and Amanda Gorman and has been a guest author at the Ledig House writers' residence (New York), the Fondazione Santa Maddalena (Florence), the Toji Cultural Centre (South Korea) and the Fundación Valparaíso (Mojácar).

Additionally, she has been translated into Dutch, Italian, Portuguese, Croatian and Esperanto. She contributes regularly to Babelia, the literary supplement of El País.

== Works ==
=== Prose ===
- Amores patológicos (Páginas de Espuma, 2023)
- Todo arde (Alfaguara, 2020)
- Ocho centímetros (Páginas de Espuma, 2015)
- El alfabeto de los pájaros (Seix Barral, 2011)
- El zoo sentimental (Alfaguara, 2000)
- Balearia (Plaza y Janés, 2000)

=== Poetry ===
- La luz de la dinamo (Vandalia, 2017). Machado Brothers Ibero-American Poetry Prize
- Nostalgia de Odiseo (Vandalia, 2012)
- El hilo de agua (Algaida, 2004). Ateneo of Sevilla Prize

=== Essays ===
- La impostora. Cuaderno de traducción de una escritora (Páginas de Espuma, 2022). Málaga Essay Prize

=== Anthologies ===
- Tsunami, miradas feministas, (Sexto piso, 2019)
- Hombres (y algunas mujeres) (Zenda, 2019)
- Cuentos breves de ir y venir (DeBolsillo, 2009)
- Comedias de Shakespeare (451 Editores, 2007)
- Tu nombre flotando en el adiós (Ediciones B, 2003)
- Cuentos de mujeres solas (Alfaguara, 2003)
- Pequeñas resistencias, (Páginas de Espuma, 2002)
- Vidas de mujer (Alianza, 1998)
- Páginas amarillas (Lengua de Trapo, 1997)

=== Translations ===
- La guitarra azul, John Banville
- Muerte en verano, Benjamin Black
- Venganza, Benjamin Black
- Órdenes sagradas, Benjamin Black
- Las sombras de Quirke, Benjamin Black
- La rubia de ojos negros, Benjamin Black
- La colina que ascendemos, Amanda Gorman
- Mi nombre es nosotros, Amanda Gorman
- La canción del cambio, Amanda Gorman
- Los muertos, James Joyce
