= J'Nai Bridges =

American mezzo-soprano singer

J’Nai Bridges
- Bridges in 2020
- Born: February 6, 1987 (age 39)
- Education: Charles Wright Academy
- Alma mater: Manhattan School of Music; Curtis Institute of Music
- Occupation: Operatic mezzo-soprano
- Awards: Marian Anderson Award, Grammy Award

J’Nai Bridges is an American mezzo-soprano opera singer. She is a winner of the Marian Anderson Award and has performed for the Metropolitan Opera, Washington National Opera, and San Francisco Opera. She has won three Grammy Awards. BET has described her as "The Beyoncé of opera".

== Early life and education ==
Bridges was raised in Lakewood, Washington. She was the third of four children and grew up listening to Motown music with her parents and singing at church. She attended high school at the Charles Wright Academy in Tacoma. Her focus was originally on basketball, but she became interested in singing after taking choir as an elective. After deciding to focus on music, she attended the Manhattan School of Music and then the Curtis Institute of Music in Philadelphia for graduate school. While participating in a young artists' program at the Lyric Opera of Chicago, she was mentored by Renée Fleming.

== Career ==
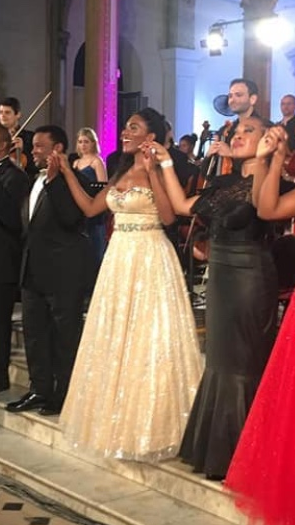
Bridges at the Saint-Georges International Music Festival in 2019

She names black opera stars Denyce Graves, Shirley Verrett, Kathleen Battle, and Jessye Norman, at whose funeral she sang, as inspirations.

Bridges sang at the Kennedy Center for the first time after winning a 2012 Marian Anderson Award. She competed in the BBC Cardiff Singer of the World competition in 2015. In 2016, she sang the role of Suzuki in Madama Butterfly at San Diego Opera, where she met and became friends with soprano Latonia Moore, and she performed at the Los Angeles Opera as Nefertiti in Akhnaten by Philip Glass.

In 2017, she performed the role of Josefa Segovia in the premiere of John Adams's Girls of the Golden West at San Francisco Opera., and in the 2019 European debut of the opera at the Dutch National Opera in Amsterdam. In June 2019, she returned to San Francisco for the title role in Bizet's Carmen. She made her Metropolitan Opera debut reprising her role in Akhnaten in November 2019, and her Washington National Opera debut as Delilah in Samson and Delilah by Saint-Saëns in March 2020.

The COVID-19 pandemic put her on-stage career on hold in favor of virtual programming. After the murder of George Floyd, she proposed and led an online panel of Black opera singers with Los Angeles Opera. She returned to the stage in January 2022 for Palm Beach Opera's production of Carmen.

In March 2022 she performed with the National Philharmonic in composer Adolphus Hailstork and librettist Herbert Martin's new work "A Knee on the Neck," a tribute to George Floyd. Critic Michael Andor Brodeur wrote that Bridges was "especially gripping" in the performance.

In 2023, she was profiled in an episode of the PBS series American Masters entitled “In the Making”. She also reunited with Latonia Moore at San Diego Opera for a concert. In October, she debuted the role of Lucinda in Jake Heggie's opera, Intelligence. The recording subsequently went on to win her third Grammy.

In October 2025, J'Nai premiered "Everything Hurts" for orchestra and mezzo-soprano with the Nashville Symphony. With music by Brian Field and text by Youth Poet Laureate Amanda Gorman, it was the first time that Gorman allowed her poetry to be set to original music.

== Awards ==
Year	Award	Category	Notes	Ref
2012	Marian Anderson Award			
2021	Grammy Awards	Best Choral Performance	For Danielpour: The Passion of Yeshua	
2022	Grammy Awards	Best Opera Recording	For Glass: Akhnaten	
2026	Grammy Awards	Best Opera Recording	For Heggie: Intelligence	
