= Darren McGavin =

American actor (1922–2006)

- McGavin in Riverboat, 1960
- Born: William Lyle Richardson; May 7, 1922; Spokane, Washington, U.S.
- Died: February 25, 2006 (aged 83); Los Angeles, California, U.S.
- Resting place: Hollywood Forever Cemetery
- Occupation: Actor
- Years active: 1944–2003
- Spouses: Anita Williams (m. 1942; div. 1943) Melanie York (m. 1944; div. 1969) Kathie Browne (m. 1969; died 2003)
- Children: 4
- Relatives: Rhiannon McGavin (granddaughter)

Darren McGavin (born William Lyle Richardson; May 7, 1922 – February 25, 2006) was an American actor.

McGavin began his career working as a set painter for Columbia Pictures. In 1954, he originated roles in Broadway productions of My Three Angels and The Rainmaker, followed by film roles in David Lean's Summertime and Otto Preminger's The Man with the Golden Arm (both 1955).

On television, McGavin portrayed the title character in Mickey Spillane's Mike Hammer (1958–1959), and starred in Riverboat (1959–1961), starred in the made for television movie, The Challenge (1970), and Kolchak: The Night Stalker (1974–1975). For his recurring role on the sitcom Murphy Brown, he received a nomination for the Primetime Emmy Award for Outstanding Guest Actor in a Comedy Series.

His film credits include No Deposit, No Return (1976), Airport '77 (1977), Hot Lead and Cold Feet (1978), A Christmas Story (1983), The Natural (1984),Happy Hell Night (1992), and Billy Madison (1995).

== Early life ==
William Lyle Richardson was born in Spokane, Washington, to Grace Mitton (née Bogart) and Reed D. Richardson. His parents divorced when he was 11 years old, and custody was given to his father, who was employed as a traveling salesman for a chemical company.

As an adolescent, McGavin's father boarded him with a family at their farm on Puget Sound near Tacoma while he traveled for work. McGavin eventually ran away from the farm, and lived with a Native American family along the Nisqually River. His father was soon notified that he had fled, and McGavin temporarily dodged police and welfare workers before his father enrolled him in a Catholic boarding school.

Around age 16, McGavin left the boarding school and temporarily lived as a runaway under the wharf in San Francisco, before moving in with his mother and stepfather, William L. Maddison, at their ranch in Southern California. While attending high school in Galt, California, McGavin developed aspirations to be an architect, and after graduating, enrolled at the College of the Pacific in Stockton, California to pursue that career. He later studied theatre at the HB Studio in New York City. McGavin was rejected for military service during World War II because of bad knees.

== Career ==
=== Broadway, film, and television ===
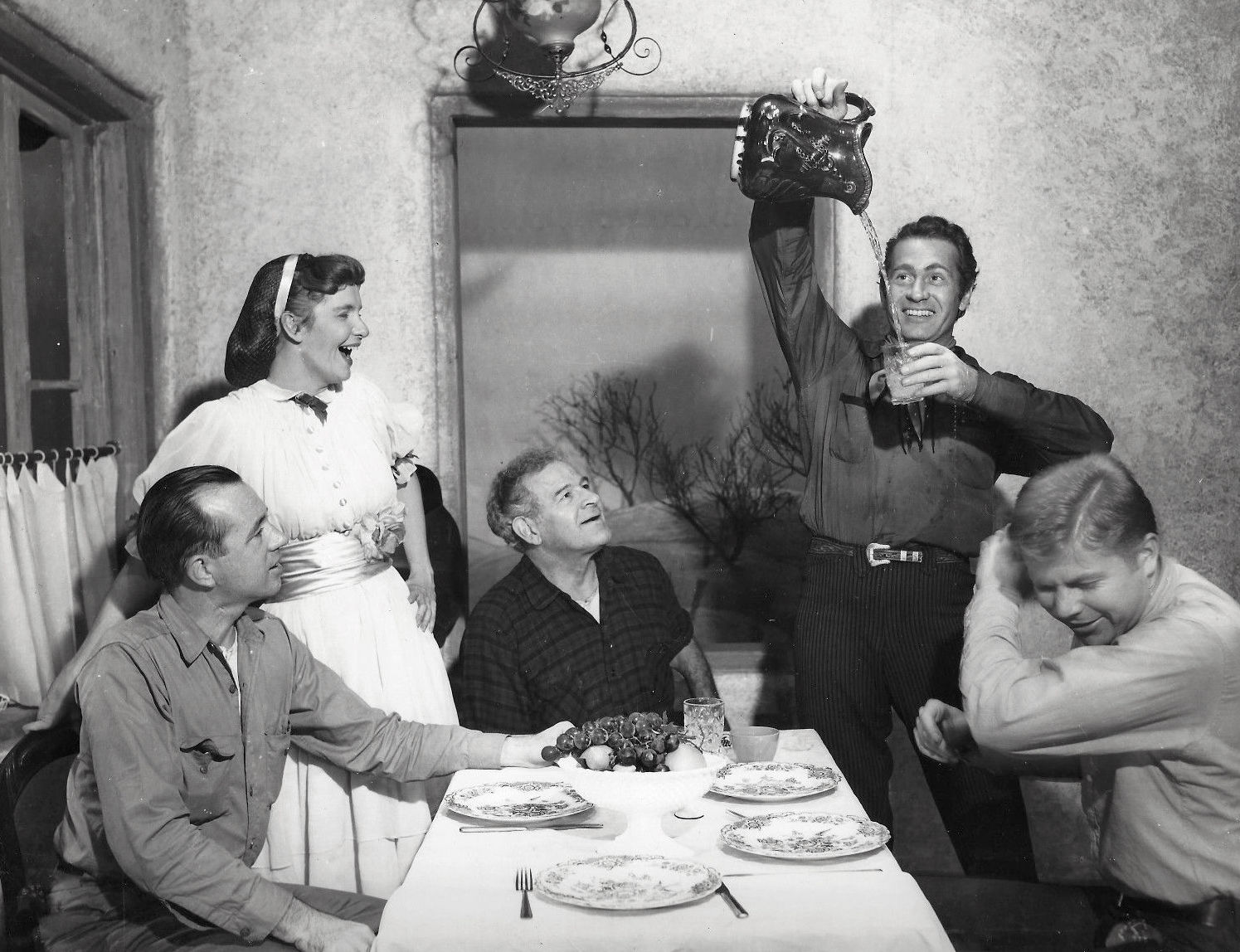
Joseph Sullivan, Geraldine Page, Cameron Prud'homme, McGavin, and Albert Salmi in the Broadway production of The Rainmaker (1954)

While attending the College of the Pacific, McGavin took a side job building scenery for a local theater group. He subsequently dropped out of college, and found work as a painter at Columbia Pictures movie studios in 1945. When an opening became available for a bit part in A Song to Remember, McGavin applied and won his first movie role. Shortly afterwards, he moved to New York City and studied at the Neighborhood Playhouse and the Actors Studio under teacher Sanford Meisner.

In 1949, he joined the cast of a touring production of Death of a Salesman, playing Happy Lohman. He began appearing on Broadway in 1954, in productions of My Three Angels and The Rainmaker (where he created the title role) opposite Geraldine Page.

While in New York, McGavin also appeared on several live theater programs that aired on television, such as Kraft Television Theatre and The U.S. Steel Hour.

McGavin returned to Hollywood in the early 1950s and appeared in the short film A Word to the Wives with Marsha Hunt, and had his first starring roles in the feature films Summertime, opposite Katharine Hepburn, and The Man with the Golden Arm (both 1955).

Also in 1955, McGavin appeared twice in the anthology series Alfred Hitchcock Presents, first in an episode titled "Triggers in Leash" and later in an episode titled "The Cheney Vase", as a scheming caretaker and aspiring art thief, opposite Carolyn Jones, Patricia Collinge, and Ruta Lee. He also later appeared in an episode of The Alfred Hitchcock Hour titled "A Matter of Murder" in 1964.

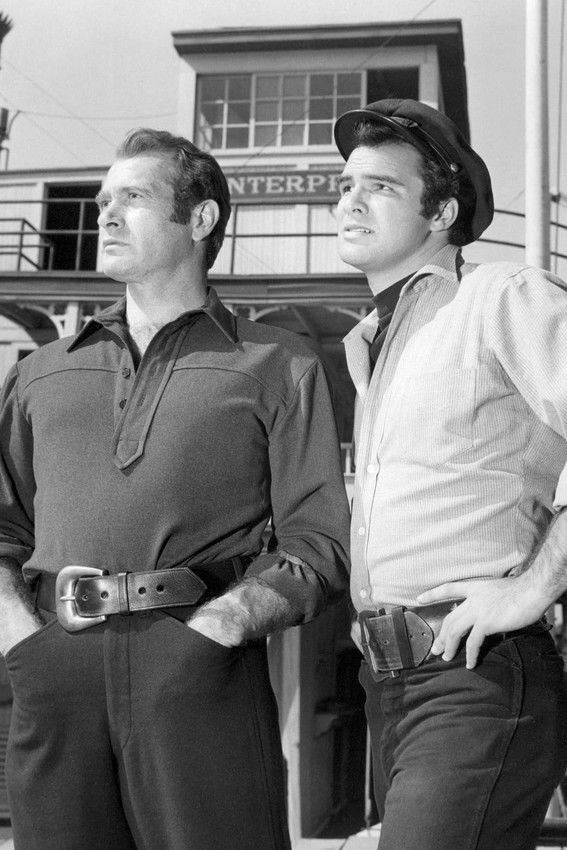
McGavin (left) and Burt Reynolds in Riverboat (1959)

Throughout his career, McGavin starred in seven different TV series and guest-starred in many more; these television roles increased in the late 1950s and early 1960s with leading parts in series such as Mickey Spillane's Mike Hammer, in which he portrayed the title character from 1957 until 1959. He was subsequently cast as Captain Grey Holden opposite Burt Reynolds in the Western series Riverboat, which aired from 1959 until 1961; Reynolds was replaced by Noah Beery Jr. midway through the series due to disputes between Reynolds and McGavin. After his departure, Reynolds told TV Guide: "Darren McGavin is going to be a very disappointed man on the first Easter after his death." Though considered by critics to be among the best actors working in television at the time, in 1960, McGavin told the Vancouver Sun that he disliked most television, likening it to purgatory for a working actor.

When Martin and Lewis broke up, McGavin played the role originally earmarked for Dean Martin in The Delicate Delinquent, Jerry Lewis's first solo film. McGavin was also known for his role as Sam Parkhill in the miniseries adaptation of The Martian Chronicles. He appeared as a fill-in regular in The Name of the Game in an episode entitled "Goodbye Harry" and was featured as a reporter in one of the Gene Barry segments. McGavin returned to theater in 1964, starring in a regional production of A Thousand Clowns, in which his teenaged son, York, also appeared. In 1964, McGavin appeared as Mark Troxel on The Virginian in the episode "The Intruders". In 1968, he starred as David Ross on the short-lived detective series The Outsider.

In 1970, McGavin appeared in Tribes, an ABC Movie of the Week that aired to critical acclaim. Tribes was a ratings success when it first aired November 10, 1970 (which happened to be the Marine Corps' 195th birthday), Tribes was later released theatrically in Britain and Europe under the title The Soldier Who Declared Peace.

=== Kolchak films and series ===
McGavin was cast as the lead in the supernatural-themed television film The Night Stalker (1972). With McGavin playing a reporter who discovers the activities of a modern-day vampire on the loose in Las Vegas, the film became the highest-rated made-for-TV movie in history at that time. The sequel The Night Strangler (1973) was also a strong success, and a subsequent television series was made titled Kolchak: The Night Stalker (1974). In the series, McGavin played Carl Kolchak, an investigative reporter for the INS, a Chicago-based news service, who regularly stumbles upon the supernatural or occult basis for a seemingly mundane crime; although his involvement routinely assisted in dispelling of the otherworldly adversary, his evidence in the case was always destroyed or seized, usually by a public official or major social figure who sought to cover up the incident. He would write his ensuing stories in a sensational, tabloid style, which advised readers that the true story was being withheld from them. McGavin reportedly entered into a verbal agreement with Sid Sheinberg (president of MCA and Universal TV) to produce The Night Stalker as a TV series as a co-production between Universal and McGavin's Taurean Productions. Early promises were never fulfilled, and McGavin expressed concern over script quality and lack of network commitment toward promoting the show. His concerns appeared justified, as the series drifted into camp humor and the production values declined in later episodes.

In 1973, prior to the production of Kolchak: The Night Stalker, McGavin made his directorial debut with the film Happy Mother's Day, Love George, a mystery film starring Cloris Leachman, Ron Howard, and Bobby Darin.

=== Later career and final work ===
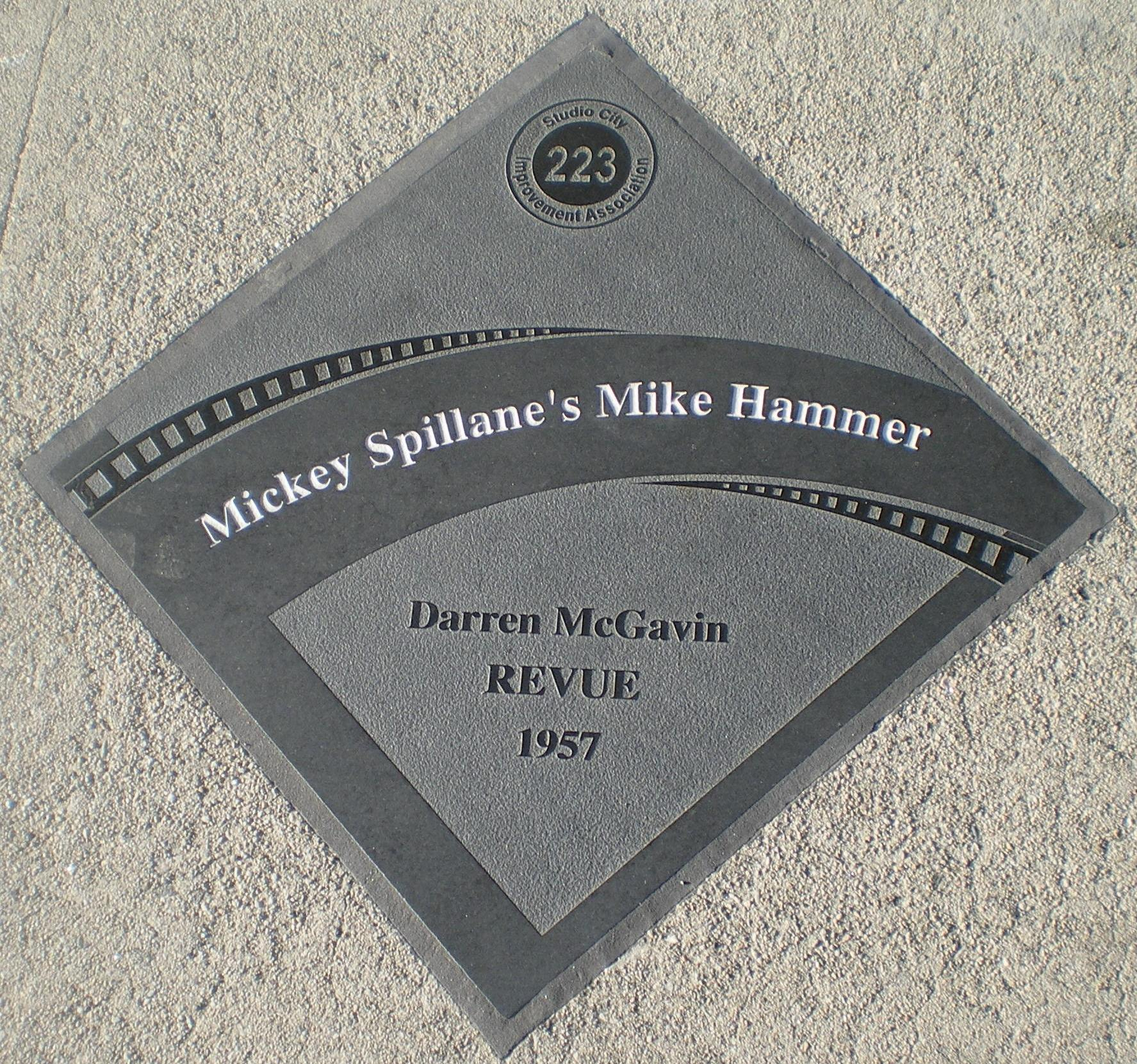
The diamond for McGavin as Mike Hammer on the Studio City Walk of Fame

In 1973, McGavin played Oliver Spencer in the original pilot film The Six Million Dollar Man. Between 1976 and 1978, McGavin also co-starred in several Disney movies, including 1976's No Deposit, No Return and 1978's Hot Lead and Cold Feet. McGavin starred in the comedy Zero to Sixty (1978), produced by his wife, Kathie Browne, in which he portrayed a divorced man attempting to sort out his life. In 1983, he starred as "the Old Man", aka Mr. Parker, the narrator's father, in Bob Clark's seasonal comedy A Christmas Story. He portrayed a middle class father in 1940s Hohman, Indiana, who was endearing despite his use of profanity and unfortunate taste for kitsch. Blissfully unaware of his family's embarrassment by his behavior, he took pride in his self-assessed ability to fix anything in record time, and carried on a tireless campaign against his neighbor's rampaging bloodhounds. The film was a moderate box-office success and went on to become a classic holiday film in the years since its release.

McGavin appeared as gambling bookie Gus Sands in 1984's sports drama The Natural, though he was uncredited. Different explanations for his lack of credit have circulated, ranging from a dispute with producers to McGavin himself requesting he not be credited.

He also appeared on a Christmas episode of the TV drama Millennium, playing the long-estranged father of lead character Frank Black (Lance Henriksen). In 1986, he took a part in John Irvin's Raw Deal, alongside then-rising star Arnold Schwarzenegger; McGavin plays a long time FBI officer who enlists a former colleague to help him unmask a mole within the Bureau working for a Chicago mob family. He won a CableACE Award (for the 1991 TV movie Clara) and received a 1990 Primetime Emmy Award nomination for Outstanding Guest Star in a Comedy Series on Murphy Brown, in which he played Murphy's father, Bill. From 1993 to 1994, he appeared in an off-Broadway production of Tom Dudzick's holiday comedy Greetings!, performed in numerous popular productions in regional and community theaters nationwide.

McGavin co-starred with Adam Sandler in Billy Madison (1995), playing the titular character's hotel-magnate father. In 1998, McGavin was asked to play the role of Arthur Dales in The X-Files, and appeared in two episodes between then and 1999. McGavin also narrated a number of audiobooks, notably the Robert Ludlum Jason Bourne Trilogy and John D. MacDonald's Travis McGee series.

== Personal life ==
McGavin was married three times. He first married Anita Marie Williams in 1942. He later married Melanie York in March 1944; their marriage ended in divorce in 1969, and produced four children, among them, Graeme McGavin, a retired actress who appeared in a string of films during the 1980s, including Angel, My Tutor, and Weekend Pass. His third marriage was to actress Kathie Browne in December 1969, ending with her death in 2003. His granddaughter, Rhiannon McGavin, is a poet and writer.

McGavin was a staunch liberal and an active Democrat.

In 1960, McGavin purchased an Alexander home in the Racquet Club Estates neighborhood of Palm Springs, California.

== Death ==
McGavin died on February 25, 2006, of cardiovascular disease in a Los Angeles hospital, aged 83. He is interred at the Hollywood Forever Cemetery. Wife Kathie Browne-McGavin is buried at another local cemetery just 6 miles away at Forest Lawn Memorial Park (Hollywood Hills) in Los Angeles County, California.

== Sources ==
- Herz, Peggy (1975). TV Close-ups. New York: Scholastic. OCLC 2360608.
- Murphy, Brenda (1995). Miller: Death of a Salesman. Cambridge: Cambridge University Press. ISBN 978-0-521-47865-6.
