= Diane Luby Lane =

American writer and nonprofit executive

- Born: Green Brook, New Jersey, U.S.
- Education: University of South Florida; New York University
- Occupations: Writer, nonprofit executive
- Employer: Get Lit
- Children: 2
- Awards: President's Volunteer Service Award
- Website: www.dianelubylane.com

Diane Luby Lane is an American writer and nonprofit executive, best known as the founder and executive director of the nonprofit Get Lit. In both 2020 and 2023 Luby Lane's organization was a Library of Congress best practice nominee for “doing exemplary, innovative and replicable work that promotes literacy and responds to the needs of our time.” Get Lit was named 2023's “Outstanding Nonprofit Organization” by the Association of Fundraising Professionals – Greater Los Angeles Chapter, and she is also the creator of the Get Lit in-school curriculum.

In 2012, Luby Lane created Get Lit's annual 3-day Classic Slam, a youth poetry slam which she co-produces.

== Career ==
Luby Lane founded the poetry organization Get Lit and remains its executive director.

She was executive producer on the feature film Our Words Collide, a documentary following the lives of five Get Lit poets in Los Angeles that premiered at the Santa Barbara International Film Festival in 2022, where it won the Anti-Defamation League (ADL) Award. She also co-produced the film Summertime, which was written by and starred 27 Get Lit poets and directed by Carlos López Estrada. Summertime opened the Sundance Film Festival in 2020 and was released to theaters in the US in the summer of 2021. In 2006 Lane wrote and starred in a one-woman show, Deep Sea Diving (AKA Born Feet First), which opened in Los Angeles and toured high schools, colleges, and detention centers with Chicano poet Jimmy Santiago Baca.

== Awards and recognition ==
Luby Lane's book Get Lit Rising (Simon & Schuster), is the winner of the 2016 Nautilus Award for young adult non-fiction.

She received the President's Volunteer Service Award from President Barack Obama.

== Personal life ==
Luby Lane lives in Los Angeles with her husband, two children, two dogs, and two cats.

== Bibliography ==
- Words of Women, Samuel French
- Get Lit Rising (with the Get Lit Players), Simon & Schuster, 2016
