= Summertime (2020 film) =

2020 film

- Theatrical release poster
- Directed by: Carlos López Estrada
- Screenplay by: Dave Harris
- Story by: The Summertime Poets
- Produced by: Kimberly Stuckwisch; Jeffrey Soros; Alisa Tager; Simon Horsman; Carlos López Estrada; Diane Luby Lane
- Starring: Tyris Winter; Marquesha Babers; Maia Mayor; Austin Antoine; Bryce Banks; Amaya Blankenship; Bene't Benton; Mila Cuda; Gordon Ip; Jason Alvarez
- Cinematography: John Schmidt
- Edited by: Jonathan Melin
- Music by: John W. Snyder
- Production companies: Los Angeles Media Fund; Little Ugly
- Distributed by: Good Deed Entertainment
- Release dates: January 23, 2020 (Sundance); July 9, 2021 (United States)
- Running time: 95 minutes
- Country: United States
- Language: English
- Box office: $72,012

Summertime is a 2020 American comedy-drama film directed by Carlos López Estrada from a screenplay by Dave Harris, and executive produced by Kelly Marie Tran. It was inspired by a spoken-word showcase with 25 diverse high school performers.

The film premiered in the NEXT section of the Sundance Film Festival on January 23, 2020.

It received a limited theatrical release on July 9, 2021, prior to VOD on September 2, 2021, by Good Deed Entertainment. It received mostly positive reviews from critics.

== Premise ==
Over the course of a hot summer day in Los Angeles, the lives of 25 young Angelinos intersect. A skating guitarist, a tagger, two wannabe rappers, an exasperated fast-food worker, a limo driver—they all weave in and out of each other's stories.

== Release ==
Summertime premiered in the NEXT section of the Sundance Film Festival on January 23, 2020. In June 2020, Good Deed Entertainment acquired North American distribution rights to the film. It was released in select theaters on July 9, 2021, before expanding a week later, on July 16.

== Reception ==
On Rotten Tomatoes, the film holds an approval rating of 80% based on 64 reviews, with an average rating of 7.3/10. The website's critics consensus reads, "Although its conceptual ambitions are muddled by its hopscotching sequences, Summertime's earnest heart beautifully captures what it means to live and breathe in the City of Angels." On Metacritic, has a weighted average score of 66 out of 100, based on 14 critics, indicating "generally favorable reviews".

Tim Grierson of Screen Daily noted that spoken word in film often comes off as pretentious, but the direction here was careful to weave between expectations, and said: "The result is a deeply touching tapestry that celebrates the diversity and cultural richness of LA, while at the same time exploring the hopes and fears of a generation heading into an uncertain adulthood." Peter Debruge of Variety called the film "inspirational" and wrote: "This fleet-footed, kaleidoscopic showcase is all about finding your voice so that the world can start to appreciate what it doesn't know about those it hears from far too seldom."
