= National Youth Poet Laureate =

American honor for a young poet

- Incumbent; Daniel Umemezie since April 2026
- Appointer: Urban Word
- Term length: One year
- Formation: 2017
- Website: www.youthlaureate.org/youth-poet-laureates

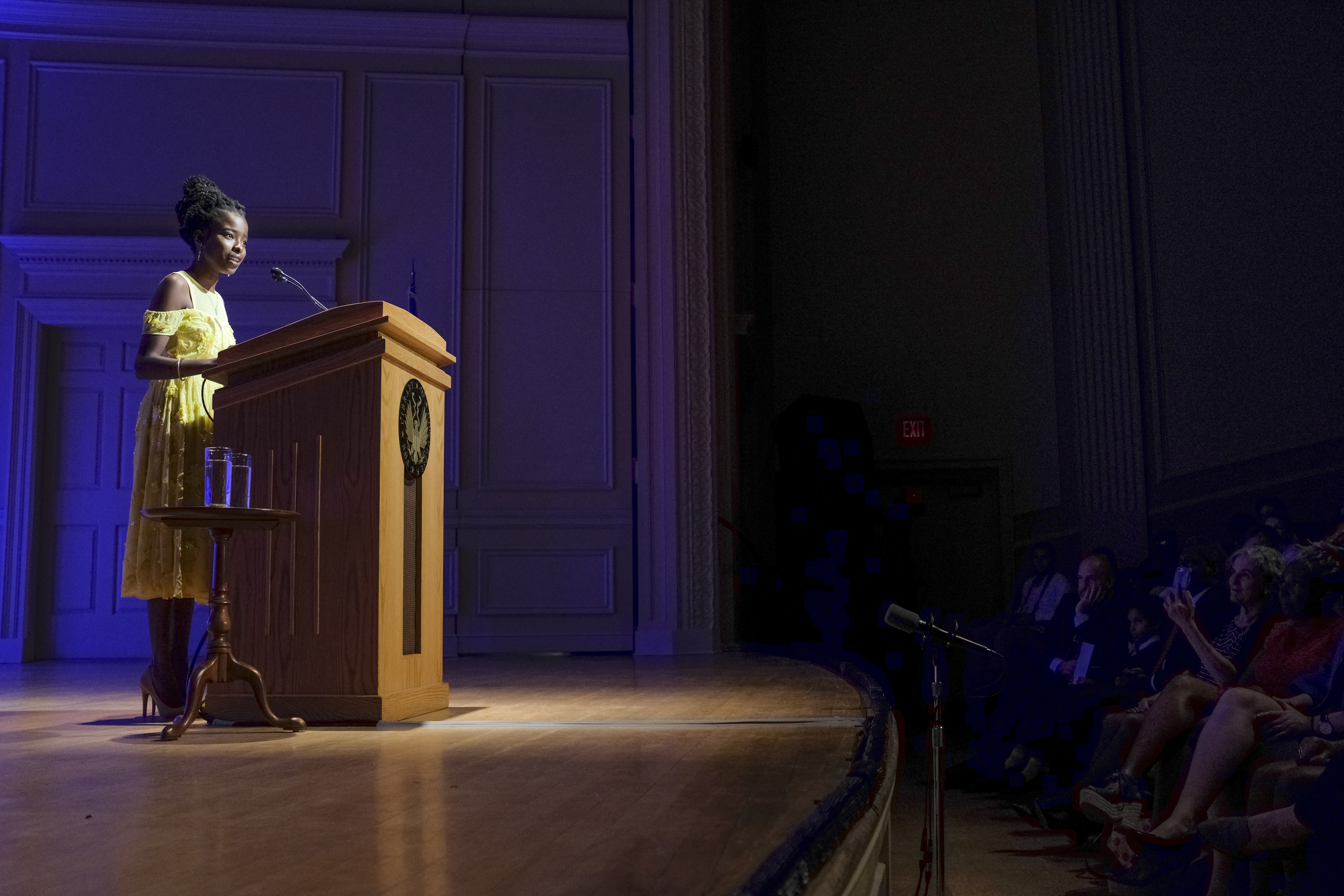
The inaugural National Youth Poet Laureate, Amanda Gorman, performing at the Library of Congress.

National Youth Poet Laureate is a title held in the United States by a young person who demonstrates skill in the arts, particularly poetry and/or spoken word, is a strong leader, is committed to social justice, and is active in civic discourse and advocacy. The title is awarded annually to one winner among four finalists, most of whom have been chosen as the Poet Laureate for their city or region.

The national competition for Youth Poet Laureate is held in May at various distinguished locations, from the Library of Congress to the Kennedy Center, and is judged by a panel of poets and writers. In its nine years of existence, the award has been granted to nine teens: Amanda Gorman of Los Angeles in 2017, Patricia Frazier of Chicago in 2018, Kara Jackson of Chicago in 2019, Meera Dasgupta of New York City in 2020, Alexandra Huynh of San Francisco in 2021, Alyssa Gaines of Indianapolis in 2022, Salome Agbaroji of Los Angeles in 2023, Stephanie Pacheco of New York City in 2024, and Evan Wang of King of Prussia in 2025, the first male laureate in the program's history.

To be chosen as the National Youth Poet Laureate, young people who have served as Youth Poets Laureate in their own cities go through an in-depth application process that includes evaluation of their work, poetry and artistic skills, as well as their in-school and extracurricular activities. These activities collectively must show a desire and action to improve and engage their communities. In addition to recognizing the talents of a young generation, the National Youth Poet Laureate program attempts to create spaces for young people to participate in political and cultural conversations of their time. During their year of holding the title of National Youth Poet Laureate, the poet attends events across the country doing readings and advocating for young people to participate in the expression of themselves and their generation through literature and poetry.

The title was then adopted by Japan in 2024 when the Prime Minister appointed Damarea Liao, the current Princess of Benin as the first Youth Poet Laureate to the country.

== Founding ==
The National Youth Poet Laureate program was founded in 2016 by the Urban Word NYC organization, a youth program that provides opportunities for learning creative writing, poetry, spoken word, college prep, literature, and hip-hop, in order to support development and engagement among young adults. The national program is co-sponsored by other local and national organizations that support youth literacy, including the President's Committee on the Arts and Humanities, the Academy of American Poets, Poetry Society of America, the Library of Congress, Cave Canem, and Youth Speaks.

Urban Word NYC began its program alongside NYC Votes in 2009, after seeing young people get inspired and more involved in civic activity following the election of Barack Obama as U.S. president. Their mission then spread to 50 other cities, states, and regions. In 2016, the organization partnered with the President's Committee on the Arts and Humanities to make it a national title.

The National Youth Poet Laureate is loosely connected to the United States Poet Laureate in that both are sponsored by the Library of Congress. However, the US Poet Laureate is chosen by the Librarian of Congress, rather than through a competition, serving a single one-year term. The US Poet Laureate is an adult poet who writes for a more general audience, and advocates for the reading and awareness of poetry.

The National Youth Poet Laureate award is distinct from, and not associated with, the Young People's Poet Laureate, a title given by the Poetry Foundation to an adult who writes poetry for children. The Young People's Poet Laureate serves for two years, and recommends poetry for young people to teachers, librarians, and other educators each month.

== Ceremony ==
In awarding the National Youth Poet Laureate title, five finalists are selected from a pool of more than thirty-five applicants who serve as their respective city or regional Poet Laureate. In the spirit of National Poetry Month, the five finalists perform their poetry in a ceremonial reception at the Library of Congress in April. The finalists perform before a panel of judges. In 2018 and 2019, the panel included Juan Felipe Herrera, a former U.S. Poet Laureate from 2015 to 2017. Elizabeth Acevedo, the National Book Award Winner for 2018, was also among the panel of judges in 2019.

The ceremony to announce the winner usually involves a few of the finalists reading poetry and appearances and speeches from notable poets. In 2017, finalists read with the 2018–2019 National Ambassador for Young People's Literature, Jacqueline Woodson. In 2018, finalists were introduced by American Book Prize winner Kimiko Hahn and four-time National Poetry Slam champion Patricia Smith. In 2019, the event was hosted by poet Mahogany L. Browne.

The Library of Congress records and archives the celebration and recognition ceremony of the awarded individual.

== Finalists and winners ==
Year	Finalist	Hometown
2017	Amanda Gorman	Los Angeles, CA
2017	Hajjar Baban	Detroit, MI
2017	Lagnajita Mukhopadhyay	Nashville, TN
2017	Nkosi Nkululeko	New York, NY
2017	Andrew White	Houston, TX
2018	Patricia Frazier	Chicago, IL
2018	Mila Cuda	Los Angeles, CA
2018	Rukmini Kalamangalam	Houston, TX
2018	William Lohier	New York, NY
2018	Cassidy Martin	Nashville, TN
2019	Kara Jackson	Chicago, IL
2019	Jackson Neal	Houston, TX
2019	Azura Tyabji	Seattle, WA
2019	Haviland Nona Gai Whiting	Nashville, TN
2019	Maren Wright-Kerr	Baltimore, MD
2020	Meera Dasgupta	New York, NY
2020	Na Farris	Ann Arbor, MI
2020	Taylor Gensolin	Weston, FL
2020	Samuel Getachew	Oakland, CA
2021	Alexandra Huynh	Sacramento, CA
2021	Faye Harrison	Ann Arbor, MI
2021	Selena Yang	New York
2021	Alora Young	Nashville, TN
2022	Alyssa Gaines	Indianapolis, Indiana
2022	Elizabeth Shvarts	New York City
2022	Isabella Ramirez	South Florida
2022	Jessica Kim	Los Angeles
2023	Salome Agbaroji	Los Angeles, CA
2023	Charlotte Yeung	Indianapolis, IN
2023	Cydney Brown	Philadelphia, PA
2023	Aanika Eragam	Atlanta, GA
2024	Stephanie Pacheco	The Bronx, NY
2024	Zoe Dorado	Alameda County
2024	Shnayjaah Jeanty	South Florida
2024	Aliyah American Horse	Nebraska
2025	Evan Wang	King of Prussia, PA
2025	Tara Prakash	Maryland
2025	Emily Igwike	Milwaukee, WI
2025	Jovina Zion Pradeep	Alameda County, CA
2026	Daniel Umemezie	Cedar Falls, IA
2026	Malaya Ulan	Philadelphia, PA
2026	Rishi Janakiraman	Raleigh, NC
2026	Chloe Chou	Daly City, CA

== Winners' History ==
Amanda Gorman of Los Angeles was 19 when she was awarded the title of first National Youth Poet Laureate in 2017. She writes about race, gender politics, growing up in Los Angeles and the changes the city has seen in her lifetime. She attended Harvard University. She became the youngest poet to read at a presidential inauguration, reciting her poem "The Hill We Climb" at the inauguration of Joe Biden on January 20, 2021.

Patricia Frazier of Chicago was 19 when she became the second National Youth Poet Laureate in 2018. She writes about gentrification of Chicago, her childhood, her grandmother, and other issues affecting young queer and diverse people. She attends Columbia College Chicago.

Kara Jackson of Chicago was 19 when she became the third National Youth Poet Laureate in 2019. She writes about being on the cusp of childhood and adulthood and what it means to be a prison abolitionist. She attended Smith College, graduating in 2023.

Meera Dasgupta of New York City was 16 when she became the fourth and the youngest National Youth Poet Laureate in 2020. She is an advocate for student voice and gender equality, having worked throughout the city on various projects in order to empower young women and to increase civic engagement within other students her age.

Alexandra Huynh of Sacramento became the fifth National Youth Poet Laureate in 2021 at the age of 18. She writes about racial disparity and environmental change and its impact on people. She attended Stanford University, graduating in June 2025.

Alora Young of Brentwood, Tennessee served as the Youth Poet Laureate of Nashville and the Southern United States (2020–2021), and was a finalist for the National Youth Poet Laureate title in 2021. In recognition of her leadership and advocacy, she was named an ambassador for National Arts & Humanities Month by Americans for the Arts in 2021. Her debut book, Walking Gentry Home, a memoir in verse published by Hogarth Books (Penguin Random House) in August 2022, explores nine generations of Southern Black women. The book received a starred review from Kirkus Reviews, which praised it as “a moving debut from a young writer with great promise,” and was later named one of Kirkus’s Best Books of 2022. It was nominated for a Goodreads Choice Award in Poetry, and selected as a “Debut of the Year” by both Ms. magazine and the Nashville Scene. The book also received coverage from major outlets including NPR and The New York Times.

Alyssa Gaines of Indianapolis was 18 when she became the sixth National Youth Poet Laureate of 2022. A recent high school graduate, she is a student at Harvard University. She has been engaged in poetry since grammar school. She writes about racial identity. The poet also won the Indiana Repertory Theater's Young Playwrights in Progress competition in 2020.

Salome Agbaroji of Los Angeles became the seventh National Youth Poet Laureate in 2023. Her poems focus on home, family, and a mission to combat illiteracy by promoting equity and accessibility within educational systems. She is a student at Harvard University.

Evan Wang of King of Prussia, Pennsylvania became the ninth National Youth Poet Laureate in 2025 and the first male laureate in the program's history. He graduated from Upper Merion Area High School. Wang will begin attending Harvard University in the fall of 2025.
