= Hadija Haruna-Oelker =

German political journalist

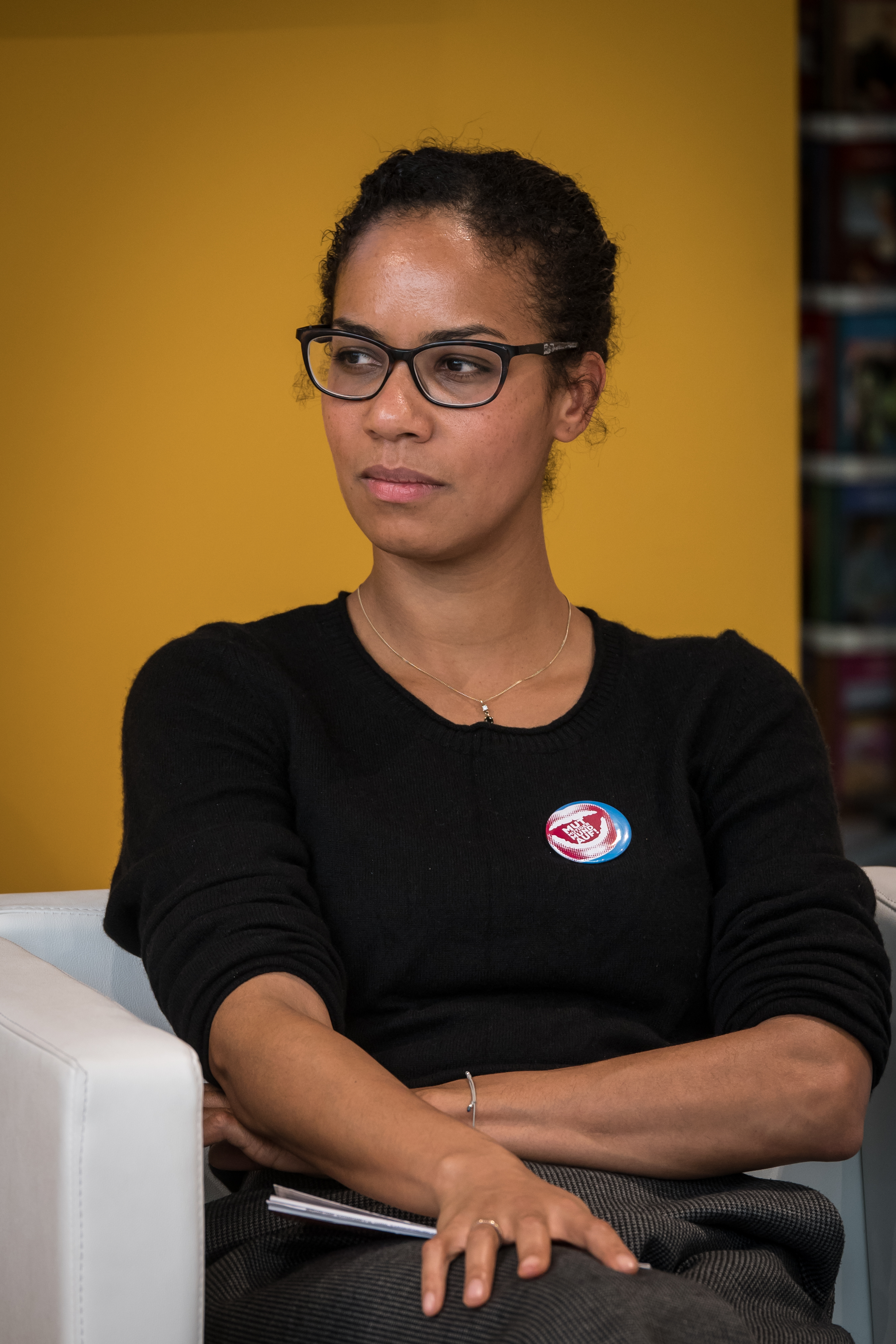
- Education: Goethe University Frankfurt
- Occupations: Politics and culture journalist
- Years active: 2003–present

Hadija Haruna-Oelker is a German journalist, radio news presenter, and political scientist. Her journalism focuses mainly on German youth, immigration to Germany, Afro-German experiences and culture, and the city of Frankfurt. Much of her reporting studies what it means to be German, and who is a prototypical member of German society.

== Education ==
Haruna-Oelker attended the Schillerschule in Frankfurt (de), graduating in 2000. In 2006, she graduated from Goethe University Frankfurt with a degree in political science and minor concentrations in economics, African Studies and Sociology. In 2007 and 2008, Haruna-Oelker was a research assistant in the faculty of political sociology at the Goethe University Frankfurt, focusing on the politics of development and migration studies. From 2008 to 2009, she trained to be a news editor at the Berlin School of Journalism (de), and then in 2014 and 2015 she trained to be a television and radio presenter at the Stuttgart Media University.

== Career ==
=== Positions ===
From 2003 to 2008, Haruna-Oelker was a staff journalist for Frizz, a city news magazine in Frankfurt. In 2008, she became a staff writer at Der Tagesspiegel where she remained until 2015. From 2010 to 2015 she was also a journalist at Fluter (de), a youth magazine published by the German Federal Agency for Civic Education. From 2012 to 2015 she was a reporter for Zeit.

Haruna-Oelker has held several positions in German news radio. In 2009 she was a planning editor for the radio broadcasts of the Hessischer Rundfunk, and in 2015 she worked as an editor for the Hessischer Rundfunk's Der Tag (de) broadcasts. In 2019, she presented original content at Deutschlandfunk Kultur, and was a monthly presenter at the Anne Frank Educational Centre.

=== Topics ===
Haruna-Oelker's journalism has largely focused on youth reporting, social affairs, migration, racism in Germany, and Afro-German culture and experiences. In addition to producing journalism about these topics, Haruna-Oelker has also delivered lectures, moderated panel discussions and workshops, and published reports including policy recommendations.

=== Awards ===
In 2012, Haruna-Oelker was awarded 2nd place in the audio category of the Kausa Media Award, which is granted by the German Federal Ministry of Education and Research to young journalists, particularly for coverage of education and migration in Germany. Haruna-Oelker won the award for her coverage of the 50th anniversary of the 1961 German-Turkish recruitment agreement. In 2015, she won First place in the Kurt Magnus Prize (de), which is awarded annually to several young radio journalists.
