= Headspace Guide to Meditation =

- Genre: Docu-series
- Written by: Tarkan Küçükaksu
- Directed by: Gabriel de Bruin; Katy Wang; Devin Clark
- Country of origin: United States
- Original language: English
- No. of seasons: 1
- No. of episodes: 8

Production
- Producers: Carlos Foglia; Ben Toland
- Editors: Alex Ricciardi; Christopher Kronus
- Running time: 19-24 minutes
- Production companies: Headspace Studios; Vox Media Studios

Original release
- Network: Netflix
- Release: January 1, 2021

Headspace Guide to Meditation is a 2021 animated docuseries created for Netflix in collaboration with Headspace. The series details the benefits of guided meditation and offers viewers techniques to help get started. It premiered on January 1, 2021. Headspace Guide to Meditation won a Daytime Emmy for Outstanding Main Title and Graphic Design in 2022.
