= 68th Scripps National Spelling Bee =

Spelling bee held in the United States in 1995

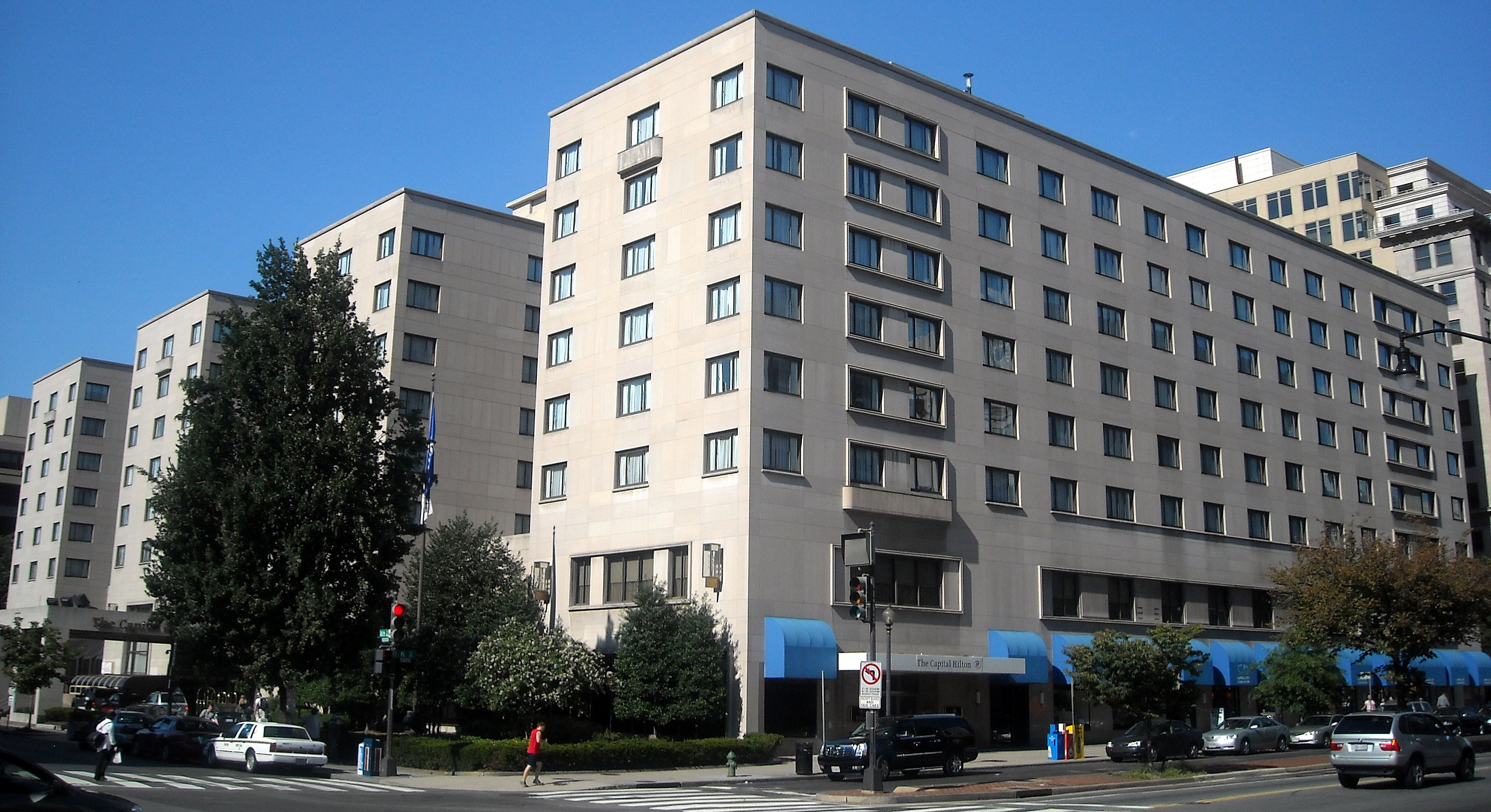
- The Capital Hilton, site of the 68th National Spelling Bee
- Date: May 31 – June 1, 1995
- Location: Capital Hilton, Washington, D.C.
- Winner: Justin Tyler Carroll (14 at time of win)
- Sponsor: The Commercial Appeal
- Sponsor location: Memphis, Tennessee
- Winning word: xanthosis
- No. of contestants: 247
- Pronouncer: Alex Cameron

The 68th Scripps National Spelling Bee was held on May 31 and June 1, 1995, at the Capital Hilton in Washington, D.C., sponsored by the E.W. Scripps Company.

== Top contestants ==
14-year-old Justin Tyler Carroll from Wynne, Arkansas won the competition on June 1 by correctly spelling the word "xanthosis". Carroll was sponsored by the Commercial Appeal in Memphis, Tennessee, after winning the Mid-South Spelling Bee, where he beat a field of contestants from counties covering five states, excluding Shelby County, Tennessee. Carroll was the third ever winner from the Greater Memphis (Mid-South) area to win the national competition, following Irving Belz in 1951 and Geoff Hooper in 1993. To advance to the national Bee, the latter two had won the Memphis-Shelby County Spelling Bee, the other regional spelling bee sponsored by Commercial Appeal specifically for schools in Memphis and Shelby County, Tennessee. (As an aside, singer Justin Timberlake competed in the 1995 Memphis-Shelby County Spelling Bee.)

Marjory Lavery, a 13-year-old home schooler from Copley, Ohio, placed second after failing to correctly spell "cappelletti" in the 10th round. There was a three-way tie for third place that included Jenelle Jindal, 13, of Princeton, New Jersey, Ryan M. Burke, 13, of Orange, Connecticut (who finished 21st the prior year), and 12-year-old Vauhini Vara of Edmond, Oklahoma.

== Competition ==
The Bee had 247 contestants, which was the largest group of spellers up to that time. Contestants ranged from age nine (three contestants) to 15, and included 45 repeat entrants. Sisters Wendy Guey (who finished 27th), age 11, and Emily Guey (who finished 59th), 13, were the first siblings to reach the same finals. Wendy would go on to win the Bee in her fourth consecutive competition the next year.

Thirty-eight spellers were eliminated on their opening words, which were drawn from the 1995 Paideia, a list of 3,000 words provided to the contestants, and the Additional Words section of the 1995 Regional Word List, also provided to the contestants. Beginning with Round 2, all words were drawn from Webster's Third New International Dictionary and its Addenda Section, copyright 1993. After the first day of competition, the number of spellers was reduced to 135. Once the field had been narrowed to 45 spellers in Round 5 on the second day of competition, ESPN2 aired the remainder of the Bee live. A total of 835 words were used in the competition.

The competition was held at the Capital Hilton, where it had been held since 1980. The competition moved to the larger Grand Hyatt Washington the next year.

The 1994–95 school year was the first year the Paideia study list (which categorized words into themes such as "birds" and "musical instruments") was used in the local and national bees. Before then, the Words of the Champions study list (which categorized words alphabetically into three difficulty levels: "Beginning Words", "Intermediate Words", and "Advanced Words") had been used annually since 1950.

== In popular culture ==
The word “xanthosis” prominently features in the film Akeelah and the Bee as a direct reference to the championship word from the 1995 Bee.
