= Dual-purpose =

Dual-purpose is a noun and adjective referring to things serving two purposes. It can specifically refer to:

- Dual-use technology
  - Dual-purpose gun, a naval artillery mounting designed to engage both surface and air targets
  - Dual-Purpose Improved Conventional Munition
  - Dual-purpose motorcycle, designed for both on- and off-road use
  - Dual Purpose Ladder (London Fire Brigade), a standard type of firefighting vehicle used by the London Fire Brigade
  - Fighting knife
  - Viaduct, a road bridge-aqueduct
- Dual-purpose breed, an animal or plant breed that provide at least two types of resources, for example, dual-purpose chicken breeds, bred for meat and egg production

== See also ==
- Dual (disambiguation)
- Purpose (disambiguation)
- Hybrid (disambiguation)
- Multi-purpose (disambiguation)
- Single-purpose (disambiguation)
