= 65th Scripps National Spelling Bee =

Spelling bee held in the United States in 1992

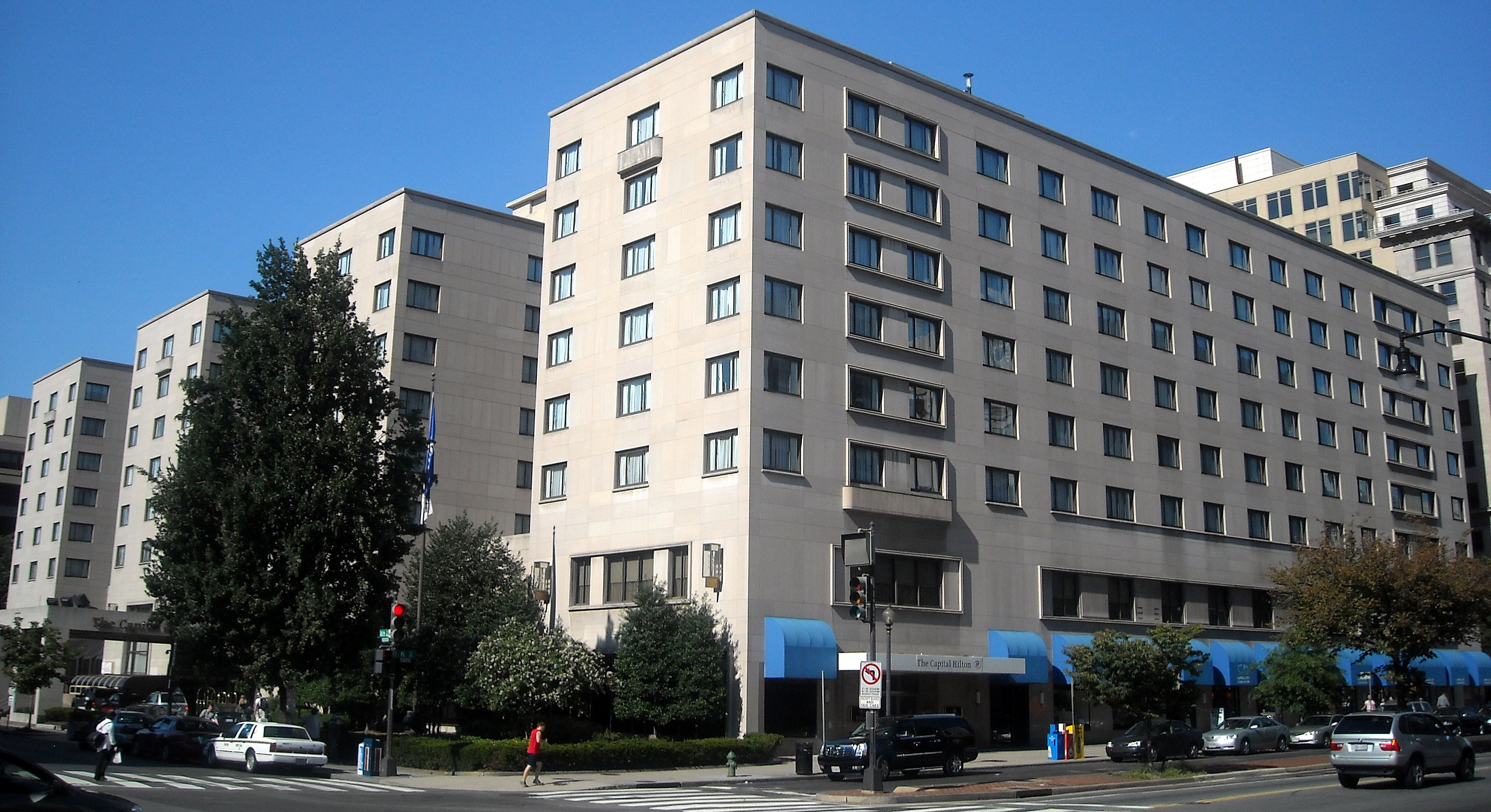
- The Capital Hilton, site of the 65th National Spelling Bee
- Date: May 27–28, 1992
- Location: The Capital Hilton in Washington, D.C.
- Winner: Amanda Goad (13 at time of win)
- Sponsor: The Richmond News Leader
- Sponsor location: Richmond, Virginia
- Winning word: lyceum
- No. of contestants: 227
- Pronouncer: Alex Cameron

The 65th Scripps National Spelling Bee was held in Washington, D.C. at the Capital Hilton on May 27–28, 1992, sponsored by the E.W. Scripps Company.

The winner was 13 year old Amanda Goad of Richmond, Virginia, spelling "lyceum" for the win. Goad had tied for fourth-place in the prior year's bee. Second place went to Todd Erik Wallace from Blackfoot, Idaho, a 14 year old in his fourth consecutive Bee, and who had finished third the prior year.

There were 227 spellers this year (the same as the prior year), 117 girls and 110 boys. 134 survived into the second day of competition. The first place prize was $5,000.

Goad later won $31,200 on the Jeopardy! Teen Tournament in 1996, and graduated from Harvard Law School in 2005.
