= 67th Scripps National Spelling Bee =

Spelling bee held in the United States in 1994

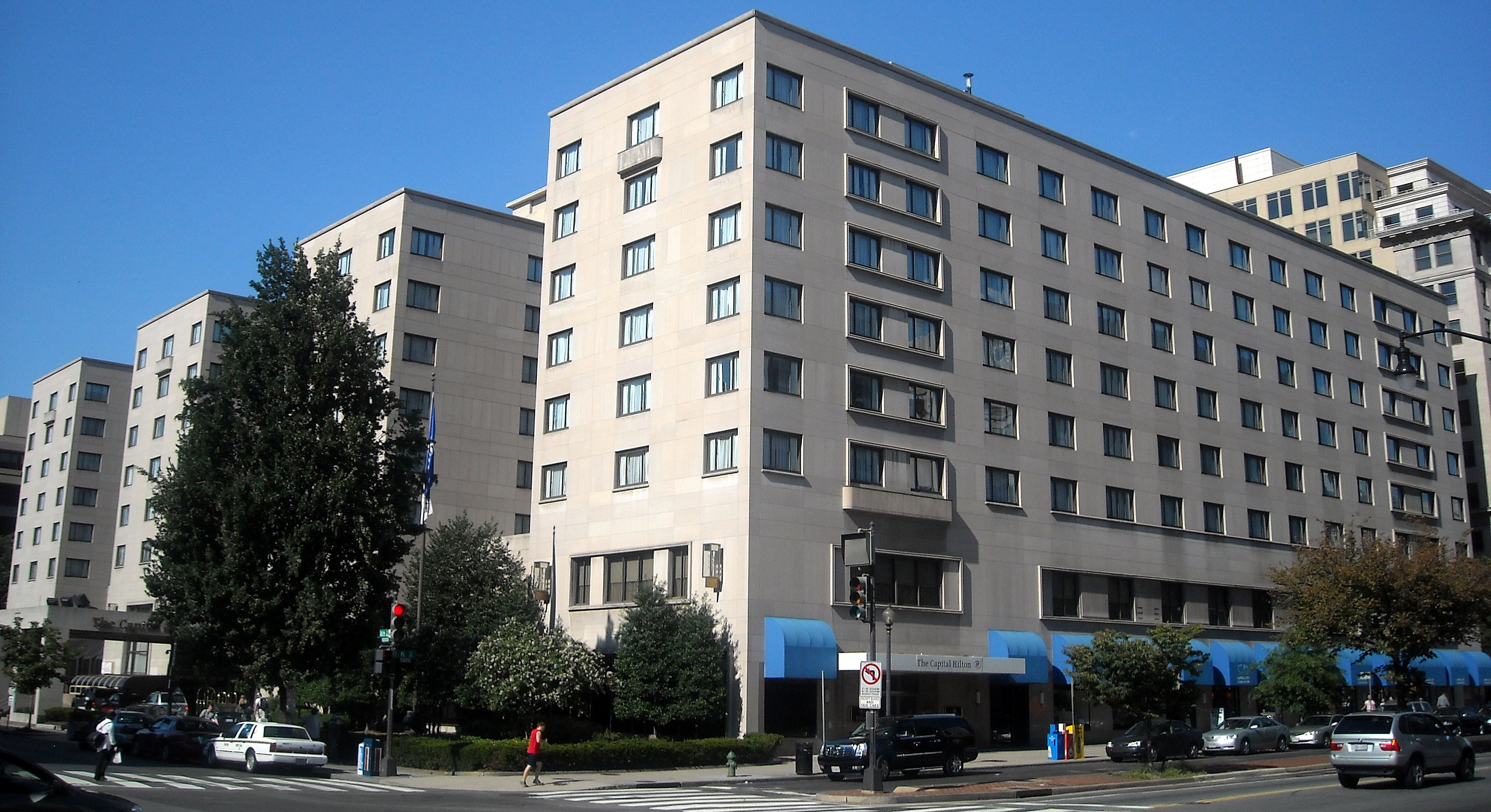
- The Capital Hilton, site of the 67th National Spelling Bee
- Date: June 1–2, 1994
- Location: Capital Hilton in Washington, D.C.
- Winner: Ned G. Andrews (13 at time of win)
- Sponsor: The Knoxville News-Sentinel
- Sponsor location: Knoxville, Tennessee
- Winning word: antediluvian
- No. of contestants: 238
- Pronouncer: Alex Cameron

The 67th Scripps National Spelling Bee was held at the Capital Hilton in Washington, D.C. on June 1–2, 1994, sponsored by the E.W. Scripps Company.

The winner was 13-year-old Ned G. Andrews from Knoxville, Tennessee, who correctly spelled "antediluvian". Brian Kane Lee, a 12-year-old from Minot, North Dakota took second, falling with "parvenuism". Both were participating in the competition for the third straight year; Andrews' previous highest finish had been 14th. Anthony Chuang, 14, of Fort Worth, Texas, took third place, misspelling "psalmodist". Wendy Guey finished 9th (and 4th the previous year), but would go on to win two years later.

The competition started with 238 contestants age 10 to 14, from all U.S. states except Delaware and Vermont, and also from Washington, D.C., Guam, Puerto Rico, and the U.S. Virgin Islands. 152 spellers survived the first day of competition. After almost nine hours on day two, the field was down to 20, and the winner was declared by 6:30 p.m. 1,068 words were used. First place won $5,000, with $4,000 for second, and $2,500 for third. A total of 1,068 words were used.

This was the first year that ESPN provided television coverage, requiring commercial breaks.
