= For John F. Kennedy His Inauguration =

Poem by Robert Frost for inauguration of John F. Kennedy

- by Robert Frost
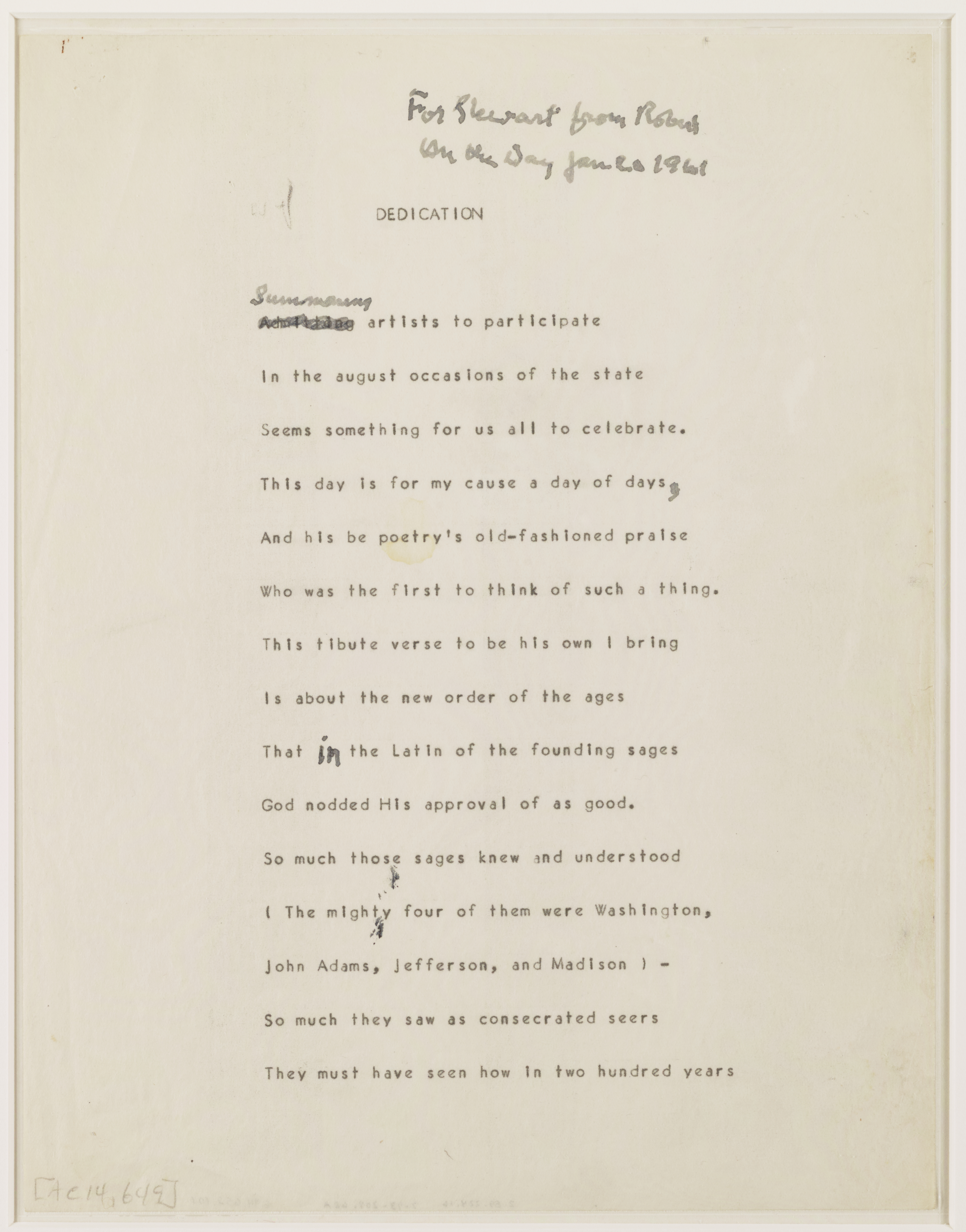
- First page of the original typescript of "Dedication", donated to the Library of Congress in 1969 by Stewart Udall.
- Written: 1961
- First published in: In the Clearing
- Country: United States
- Subject: Inauguration of John F. Kennedy
- Publication date: 1962
- OCLC: 8086198

"For John F. Kennedy His Inauguration" (originally titled "Dedication") is a poem written by the American poet Robert Frost for the presidential inauguration of John F. Kennedy on January 20, 1961.

== Background ==
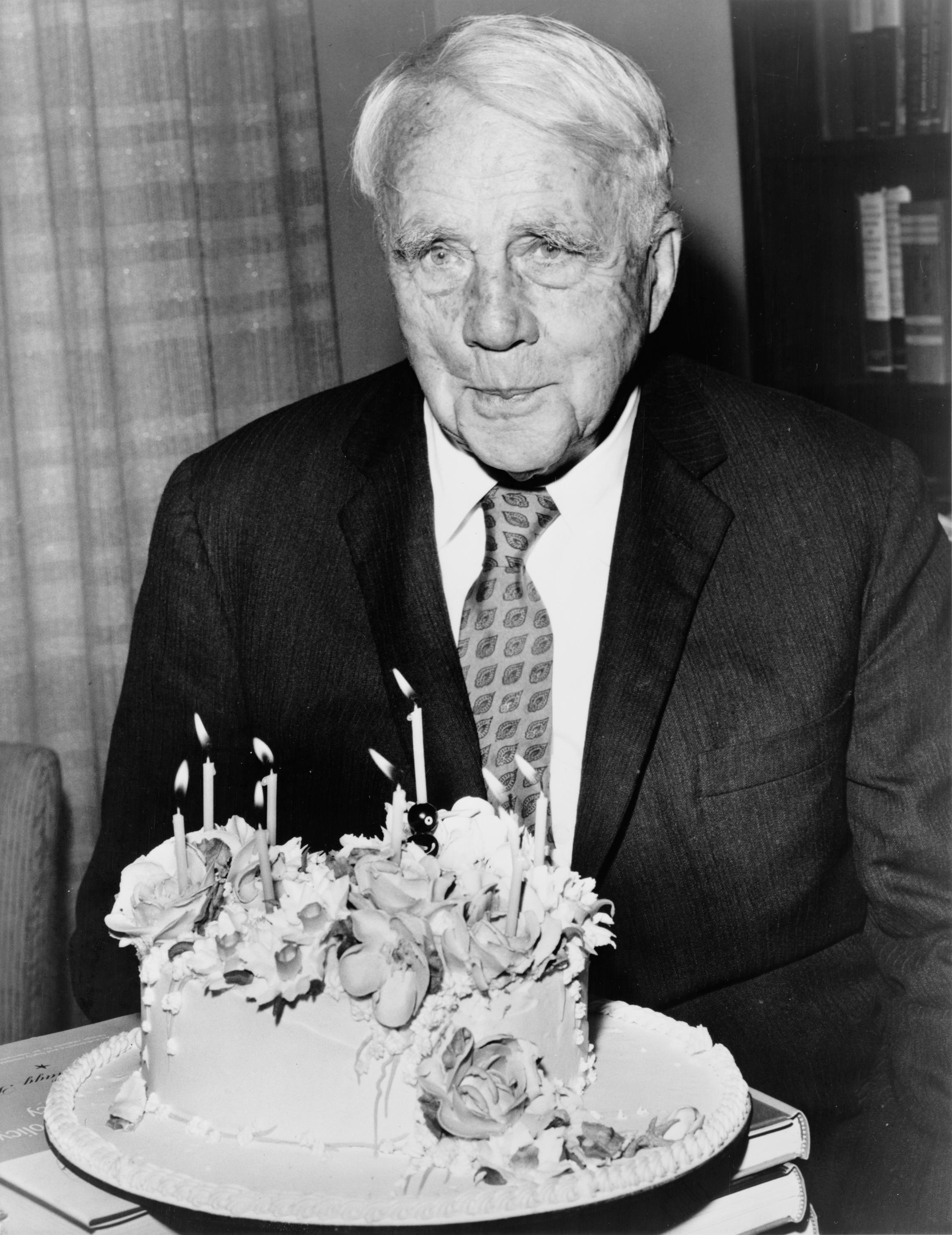
Frost on his 85th birthday

Robert Frost was an American poet born in San Francisco, California, in 1874. His poems were initially published in the United Kingdom before being published in the United States. He was a four-time recipient of the Pulitzer Prize, and was widely referred as an esteemed poet.

Kennedy had asked Frost to read "The Gift Outright" and Frost had agreed, but upon viewing the arrangements for the inauguration, spent the evening before the ceremony composing this new poem as preamble to the requested poem. However, in the bright sunshine of the event he had difficulty reading his new poem and resorted to reciting "The Gift Outright" alone.

Frost's handwritten copy was framed with a note from Jacqueline Kennedy written in pencil upon its back: "For Jack. First thing I had framed to be put in your office. First thing to be hung there." This copy was donated to the John F. Kennedy Presidential Library, arriving unannounced through the mail, April 2006 via bequest of a will of a former Kennedy Administration staff member who died in 2005.

== Analysis ==
Titled "Dedication", the poem discussed many of the same patriotic themes as "The Gift Outright", but with explicit references to contemporary events such as the close presidential election of 1960: "The greatest vote a people ever cast, / So close yet sure to be abided by".

Frost noted that this was the first time a poem had been read at a presidential inauguration, a trend which would continue. This was an historical milestone because it united poetry with politics. He made allusion to Kennedy's book Profiles in Courage as indicative of the courageous political leader that Kennedy exemplified.

A major theme was that a "new order of the ages" had been created. France, Spain, and Holland had engaged in a rivalry for control of the New World that Christopher Columbus had discovered. "Heroes" had emerged. England had won. The American Founding Fathers, George Washington, John Adams, Thomas Jefferson, and James Madison had envisioned a country that would nurture democratic principles which would serve as inspiration to all the peoples of the world.

The Wright Brothers were cited as examples of American innovation and discovery which lifted up all of humanity.

The Declaration of Independence had resulted in a model for the world to follow. The fundamental principle was democracy. Courage was required to sustain it. A new "Augustan age" was now emerging: "A golden age of poetry and power."

== Works cited ==
- "'Dedication,' Robert Frost's presidential inaugural poem, 20 January 1961". Steward L. Udall Collection. Library of Congress.
- Burnshaw, Stanley (2000) [1999]. "Frost, Robert". American National Biography. Oxford University Press. doi:10.1093/anb/9780198606697.article.1600598. ISBN 978-0-19-860669-7.
