= GPSI =

GPSI may refer to:

- GTP diphosphokinase, an enzyme
- General Purpose Serial Interface
