= General-purpose =

General-purpose may refer to:

- General-purpose technology
- General-purpose alternating current, AC electric power supply
- General-purpose autonomous robots
- General-purpose heat source

== Law and government ==
- General-purpose administrative subdivision
- General-purpose criterion, in international law
- General-purpose district

== Military ==
- A popular false etymology for the Willys MB "Jeep"
- General-purpose bomb
- General-purpose machine gun
- General-purpose mask, M50 Joint-Service
- General-purpose vessel, Explorer class in the Royal Australian Navy

== Computing ==
- General-purpose computer
- General-purpose DBMS
- General-Purpose Graphics Processing Unit (GPGPU)
- General-purpose input/output (GPIO)
- General-purpose macro processor
- General-purpose markup language
- General-purpose modeling
- General-purpose operating system
- General-purpose macro processor or general-purpose preprocessor
- General-purpose programming language
- General-purpose register
- General-Purpose Serial Interface (GPSI)

== See also ==
- General (disambiguation)
- Purpose (disambiguation)
- Jeep (disambiguation)
- GP (disambiguation)
