= Purpose =

Purpose is the end for which something is done, created or for which it exists. Purpose is an abiding intention to achieve a long-term goal that is both personally meaningful and makes a positive mark on the world. It is part of the topic of intentionality and goal-seeking behavior.

Related concepts and subjects:

- Goal, a desired result or possible outcome
- Intention, the state of intending something or the action intended
- Motivation, a driving factor for actions, willingness, and goals
- Determination or resolve
- Meaningful life — a life of purpose
- Purpose clause, in grammar a dependent adverbial clause expressing purpose
- Purpose of life, questions regarding the significance of living or existence in general
- Teleology, the philosophical attempt to describe things in terms of their apparent purpose or goal
- Teleonomy, the apparent purposefulness of structures and functions in living organisms

== Music ==
- Purpose (Curtis Lundy album), 2002
- Purpose (Algebra album), 2008
- Purpose (Justin Bieber album), or the title song, 2015
- Purpose (Taeyeon album), 2021
- "Purpose", song from the musical Avenue Q

== Film ==
- Purpose (film), a 2001 American independent drama thriller film

== People ==
- Darryl Purpose, American singer-songwriter

== See also ==
- Accidentally on Purpose (disambiguation)
- All-purpose (disambiguation)
- Dual-purpose (disambiguation)
- General-purpose (disambiguation)
- Multi-purpose (disambiguation)
- On Purpose (disambiguation)
- Single-purpose (disambiguation)
- Goal (disambiguation)
- Target (disambiguation)
