= A Witness Tree =

1942 collection of poems by Robert Frost

- Author: Robert Frost
- Language: English
- Genre: Poetry
- Publisher: Henry Holt and Company
- Publication date: 1942
- Publication place: U.S.
- Pages: 68
- Awards: Pulitzer Prize for Poetry (1943)

A Witness Tree is a poetry collection by Robert Frost, most of which are short lyric, first published in 1942 by Henry Holt and Company in New York. The collection was awarded the Pulitzer Prize for Poetry in 1943.

== Background ==
This collection was published after several unfortunate tragedies had occurred in Frost's personal life, including his daughter Marjorie's death in 1934, his wife's death in 1938, and his son Carol's suicide in 1940. Despite these losses, Frost continued to work on his poetry and eventually fell in love with his secretary Kay Marrison, who became the primary inspiration of the love poems in this collection. This collection is the last of Frost's books that demonstrates the seamless lyric quality of his earlier poems. The most popular poem of this volume is "The Gift Outright", which was recited at the presidential inauguration of John F. Kennedy in 1961. The book is 42 poems in length, and it is broken into five sections "One or Two," "Two or More," "Time Out," "Quantula," and "Over Back." In the book, Frost is interested in race, mortality, religion, science, and philosophy. The imagery is drawn from the natural world and from the ordinary, as is the case in "All Revelation," in which Frost demonstrates the revelation inside a head-tilt ("a head thrusts" (14)). Something small, a rock, a leaf, a head-tilt, inspires epiphanic turns in the poems, which often utilize the form and rhyme of a sonnet. For example, three of the five sections begin with a sonnet. Another form Frost uses is the heroic couplet, which is often down-played through the use of enjambment, understatement, and conversational language. It gives an ironic, satirical tone to many of the voices in the collection. Frost uses racist language, including racial slurs and white supremacist ideology, in the book.

== See also ==
- The Witness Tree
