= Throop Mill =

Grade II listed mill in Throop, Dorset

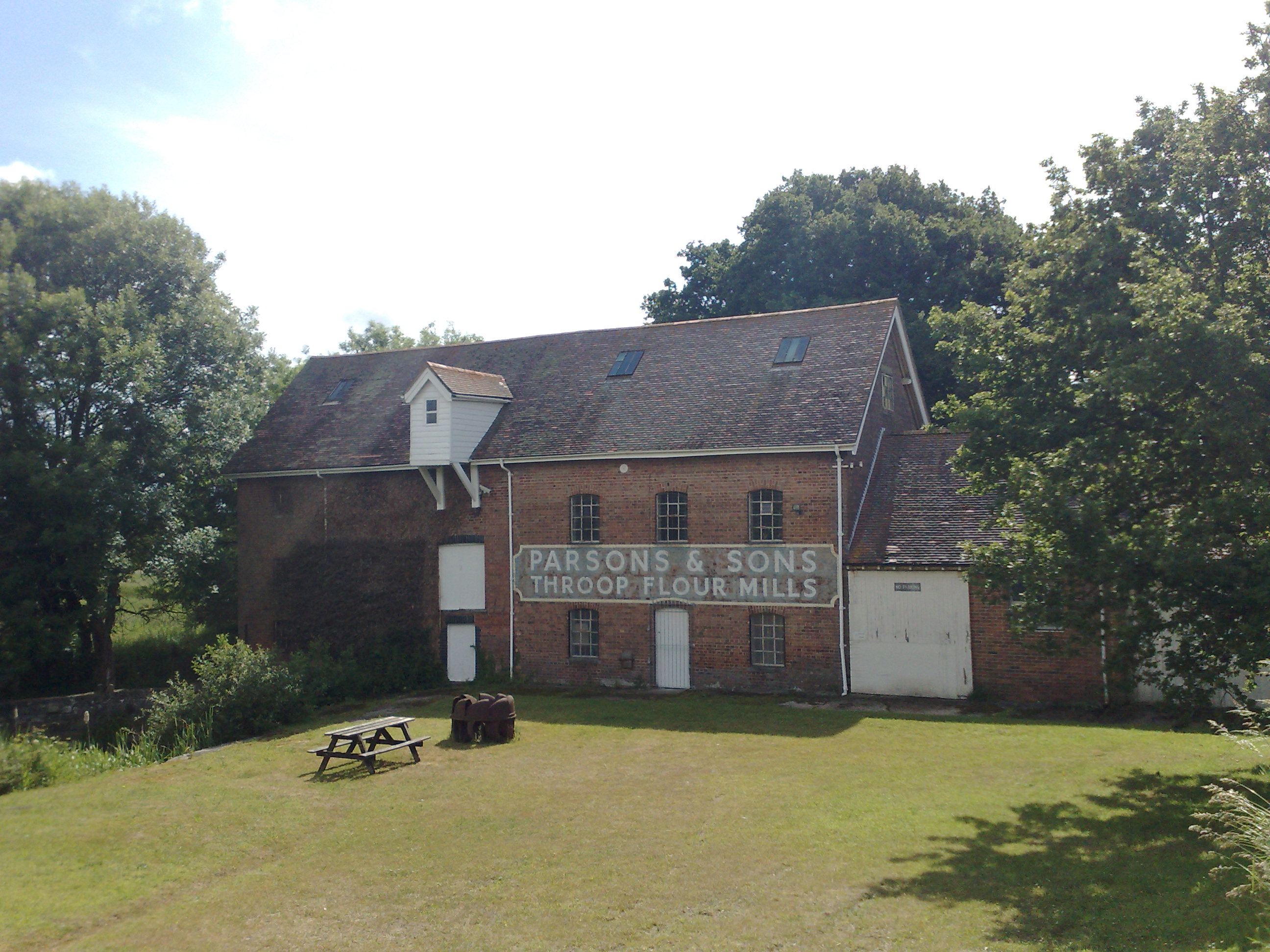
- Throop Mill in 2009

- Location within Dorset
- Current status: Disused
- Location: Throop, Bournemouth
- Owner: Heygate & Sons (1957–present)
- Further ownership: William the Conqueror (c. 1066–1087); Quarr Abbey (1200–1321); Parsons and Sons (1925–1957)
- Coordinates: 50.7607°N 1.8398°W

Construction
- Built: c. 1000s (original building) 1912 (current building)
- Employees: Richard Parsons (1925–1957); Cecil Biles (1929–1981)
- Floor count: 4

Throop Mill is a Grade II listed former water-powered flour mill located on the River Stour in the village of Throop on the north-eastern edge of Bournemouth, Dorset.

== History ==
Throop Mill has been present in some regard since at least the 11th century. (Note: It has been speculated that the original mill may have existed prior to the 11th century, possibly as far back as Anglo-Saxon England.) Originally located on land owned by Earl Tostig Godwinson, an estate which was, at the time, worth £44, it was seized in 1066 after the Norman Conquest. The land was briefly gifted to Hugh de Port by William the Conqueror before being transferred back under ownership by The Crown.

Throop Mill was subsequently recorded in William the Conqueror's Domesday Book in 1086, in which it was named Holdenhurst Mill, although it is unclear whether it was in its current location or nearby. The mill was worth fifteen shillings at the time, though the value of the land itself had gone from £44 to £24 as William the Conqueror had carved three and a half hides of the land to add to the New Forest as his hunting ground. It was originally located on the edge of a marshland swamp, which provided fish, eels and wild duck to local people. Pigs were also farmed at the mill, and reeds and rushes were harvested from the marsh. It is also thought the mill was involved with illegal smuggling throughout the 11th century in order to avoid high royal taxes. In the 1100s, the mill, along with the manor, was gifted by Henry I to Richard de Redvers, and from that point onward was passed down through the de Redvers' family line.

In 1200, monks from Quarr Abbey rented the mill out and began working inside of it, intending to provide education and healthcare to local villagers. In 1282, following a combination of high taxes and a poor harvest, the monks left the mill, and it was leased to Christchurch Priory. By 1321, the mill was generating only four shillings a year, and as a result Quarr Abbey completely severed ownership ties with it, leaving the mill to be managed by the Manor of Christchurch. The mill was passed down between tenants over time and throughout generations. During the Tudor period, the mill was used to produce hardtack for naval ships.

In 1539, after Henry VIII ordered the Dissolution of the Monasteries, the ownership of the mill was transferred from Christchurch Priory back to The Crown. The mill and the Manor of Westover were subsequently granted to Catherine Parr as part of her dower estate, and later the Earls of Clarendon. Subsequently, the mill became involved with international trade, and biscuits made at the mill were exported to Newfoundland. In the 1700s the estate was purchased by George Ivison Tapps and was absorbed into the Tapps-Gervis-Meyrick baronetcy.

With the more modern four storey mill having been built in the mid 19th century, in the 1890s, the mill's old cob walls were replaced with bricks to prevent it from falling into disrepair. This was completed in 1900. In the same year, the mill commissioned local Ringwood firm Armfield Engineering to install a 50" turbine at a cost of £165. Additionally, a belt and pulley system powered by water, which included augers and bucket elevators to transport grain, was installed. The current building was finally modernised in 1912. The mill's sluice gates, conversely, were manufactured by two different firms. The three southern gates were manufactured by the Dorset Iron Foundry Company based in Poole, and the northern three had been manufactured by Dorchester based company Lott & Warne Ltd and installed in 1936.

The mill in 2020. Parsons & Sons' branding is still visible on the front of the structure.

In 1925, the mill was acquired by Parsons and Sons Throop Flour Mills, a family business that was run by Richard Parsons. In 1944, following renovations to the mill, the foundations of an earlier mill's structure were found underneath it, and coins dating to the reigns of George III and George IV were found in the mill's stream. (Note: Spanish and Portuguese coins have also been found in the adjacent bodies of water to the mill, implying that it was involved in illegal smuggling long after the 11th century, possibly as recent as the 17th and 18 centuries.) Parsons and Sons used the mill until selling it in 1957 to Heygate & Sons, who continued to operate the mill under the Parsons and Sons name. The name of the business still remains on the outside of the mill. In 1972, the mill closed but was kept in use to store flour, bran and animal feed. Additionally, the mill's workings were removed and transported to Northamptonshire to repair another mill. In 1974, Heygate & Sons ceased operations entirely due to water drying up with the creation of a flood relief scheme further up the River Stour. Although not in use, the early 20th-century milling machinery still remained inside of the building. Examples of this can still be seen, notably the 50" turbine, which is now located on the grass outside the mill.

In 1975, the mill was granted Grade II listed status by Historic England. This was due to its sluice gates, with Historic England stating "despite the mid-C20 date of the machinery, the structure is remarkably complete and an increasingly rare survival of its type".

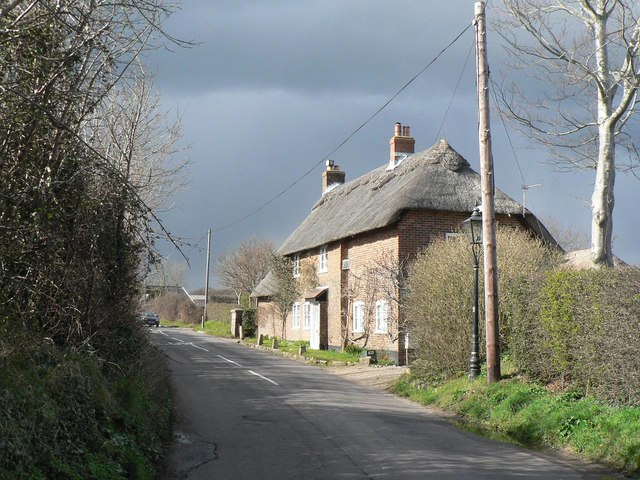
Throop Mill Cottage, where the owner of the mill traditionally resided.

The final miller of the mill, Cecil "Cis" Biles, had remained devoted to the mill after it had closed, and he ultimately wished to pass away inside the mill and be carried out of it by his sons. In 1981, this wish came true, and Biles died inside the mill on the fourth floor. A plaque was later placed in the mill car park to commemorate Biles. Throop Mill was subsequently left abandoned under the ownership of Heygate & Sons. The building began to slowly deteriorate as it was not maintained, leading the council to issue repair notices to Heygate on multiple occasions as it fell into disrepair. Maintenance was eventually forced in 2010 as the mill was in a state of severe disrepair, and its sluice gates were repaired to allow the flow of the stream to continue to be controlled. The site was later the subject of further repairs following public campaigns and a petition for Heygate & Sons to maintain it. The mill's nearby original wooden weir bridge was also closed in 2012 and later demolished in 2013 due to severe rotting in its beams, being replaced in that same year.

Throop Mill stream, situated behind the mill. Coins dating back to the reigns of George III and George IV have been discovered in it.

=== Present day ===
For decades, campaigners have advocated for the mill's restoration as a visitor centre, museum, or cafe. In 2012, the council intended to turn the mill into a visitor centre, but Heygate & Sons expressed that the presence of original milling equipment, which is still sealed inside of the mill, "suppressed the potential value of the site" and have kept the building mothballed. In October 2024, Throop Mill was put up for sale by Heygate and Sons. The property has been listed with a guide price in excess of £500,000.

=== Folklore ===
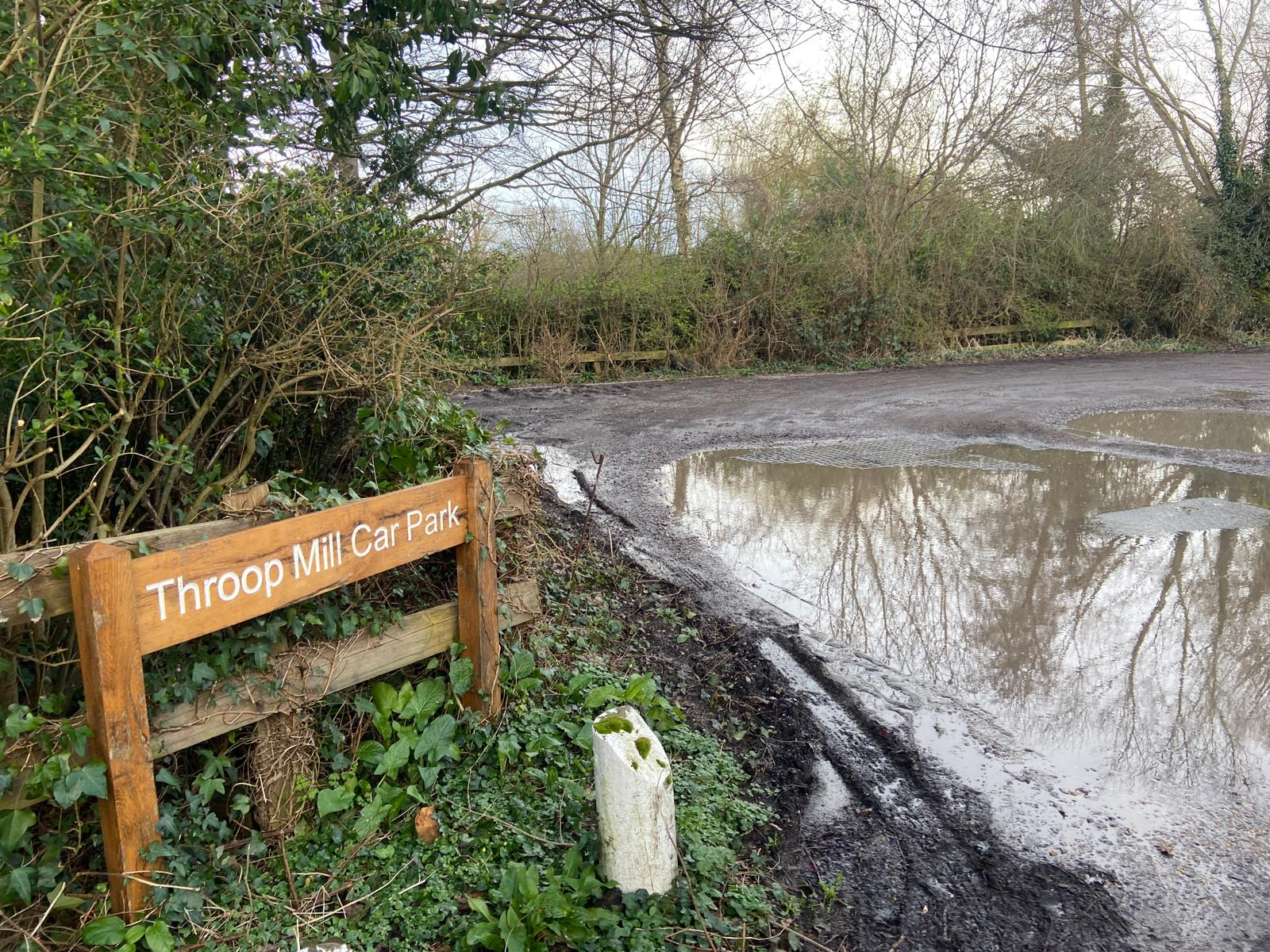
Throop Mill Car Park, where the plaque commemorating Cecil 'Cis' Biles is located.

Throop Mill has been the subject of local folklore alleging that the building and its surrounding area is haunted. One tale alleges that, in the 1800s, a group of local children had gone down to the mill on a Sunday afternoon to play and subsequently drowned in an adjacent body of water, possibly the mill pond, after an accident. The ghosts of these children are said to appear in "their Sunday best" along the riverbank laughing and singing during the day, and sobbing inside the mill at night. In some stories these children are conversely referred to as "tormented children with no faces". Additionally, in other tales the children who perished had actually been employed by the mill or had simply gone missing having been last seen by the mill.

A second well-known tale alleges the sightings of black figures resembling medieval monks pacing around the riverbanks watching over their old land.

There is a tale passed down between local fishermen that there is a World War II Army jeep sunken at the bottom of the mill pond, though no evidence of this has ever been found.

== See also ==
- Throop
- River Stour (Dorset)
- Quarr Abbey
