= In the Clearing =

Poetry collection

1962 first edition.

In the Clearing is a 1962 poetry collection by Robert Frost. It contains the poem "For John F. Kennedy His Inauguration", much of which Frost had composed to be read at President Kennedy's inauguration but could not. The book is also known for "Kitty Hawk", the book's longest poem, which muses on the Wright Brothers' accomplishment in manned flight.

== Preparation ==
Invited to recite "The Gift Outright" at the inauguration of President John F. Kennedy, Frost composed a new, prefatory poem that became "For John F. Kennedy His Inauguration". At the actual event Frost wasn't able to read the latter poem, but recited the former from memory.

After the Kennedy inauguration, Frost had "high hopes" of finishing the collection of poems he had been promising Holt for the past several years. As of 1954, the title was "The Great Misgiving". It had been Frost's misgivings about the quality of his later poetry that had prevented him from putting it into print much earlier.

== Publication ==
Published by Holt, Rinehart and Winston in New York on his 88th birthday, March 26, 1962, ten months before his death, it was the last volume of his poetry published in his lifetime.

== Contents ==
- "But God's Own Descent" (Note: Frontispiece poem, excerpted from "Kitty Hawk".)
- "Pod of the Milkweed"
- "Away!"
- "A Cabin in the Clearing" (Note: From which poem title the book title is taken.)
- "Closed for Good"
- "America Is Hard to See"
- "One More Brevity"
- "Escapist - Never"
- "For John F. Kennedy His Inauguration" (Note: Expansion of the poem Frost meant to deliver at the JFK inaugural, instead of "The Gift Outright".)

- CLUSTER OF FAITH* (Note: Boldface, all-capitals headings denote sections of several poems to be considered together and whose titles are similarly indented in book's table of contents as they are here.)

- "Accidentally on Purpose"
- "A Never Naught Song"
- "Version"
- "A Concept Self-Conceived"
- "Forgive, O Lord" (Note: Poem is not properly titled. Its title is taken from the poem's first line.)

- "Kitty Hawk"
- "Auspex"
- "The Draft Horse"
- "Ends"
- "Peril of Hope"
- "Questioning Faces"
- "Does No One at All

Ever Feel This Way in the Least?"

- "The Bad Island - Easter"
- "Our Doom to Bloom"
- "The Objection to Being Stepped On"
- "A-Wishing Well"
- "How Hard It Is to Keep from Being King

When It's in You and in the Situation"

- "Lines Written in Dejection

on the Eve of Great Success"

- "The Milky Way Is a Cowpath"
- "Some Science Fiction"

- QUANDARY

- "Quandary"
- "A Reflex"
- "In a Glass of Cider"
- "From Iron"
- "Four-Room Shack Aspiring High"
- "But Outer Space"
- "On Being Chosen Poet of Vermont"
- "We Vainly Wrestle with the Blind Belief"
- "It Takes All Sorts of In and Outdoor Schooling"
- "In Winter in the Woods Alone"
