= Accidentally on Purpose =

Accidentally on Purpose may refer to:

- Accidentally on Purpose (TV series), an American sitcom starring Jenna Elfman
- Accidentally on Purpose (Ian Gillan and Roger Glover album), 1988
- Accidentally on Purpose (The Shires album), 2018
- Accidentally on Purpose (song), a song by George Jones
- Accidentally on Purpose (EP), a 2025 EP by Seulgi
- Accidentally on Purpose, a 2005 short film featuring Joey Diaz
- Accidentally on Purpose, a 1991 autobiography by Michael York
- Accidentally on Purpose: Reflections on Life, Acting and the Nine Natural Laws of Creativity, a book by John Strasberg
- "Accidentally on Purpose", a poem by Robert Frost published in his 1962 compilation In the Clearing
