= Geep =

Geep or geeps may refer to:

- Sheep–goat hybrid, a hybrid offspring of a sheep and a goat
- A nickname for the EMD GP series of diesel locomotives
- Zips, slang term used by Italian American mobsters to refer to newer immigrant Italian mobsters

== See also ==
- Jeep (disambiguation)
