= 64th Scripps National Spelling Bee =

Spelling bee held in the United States in 1991

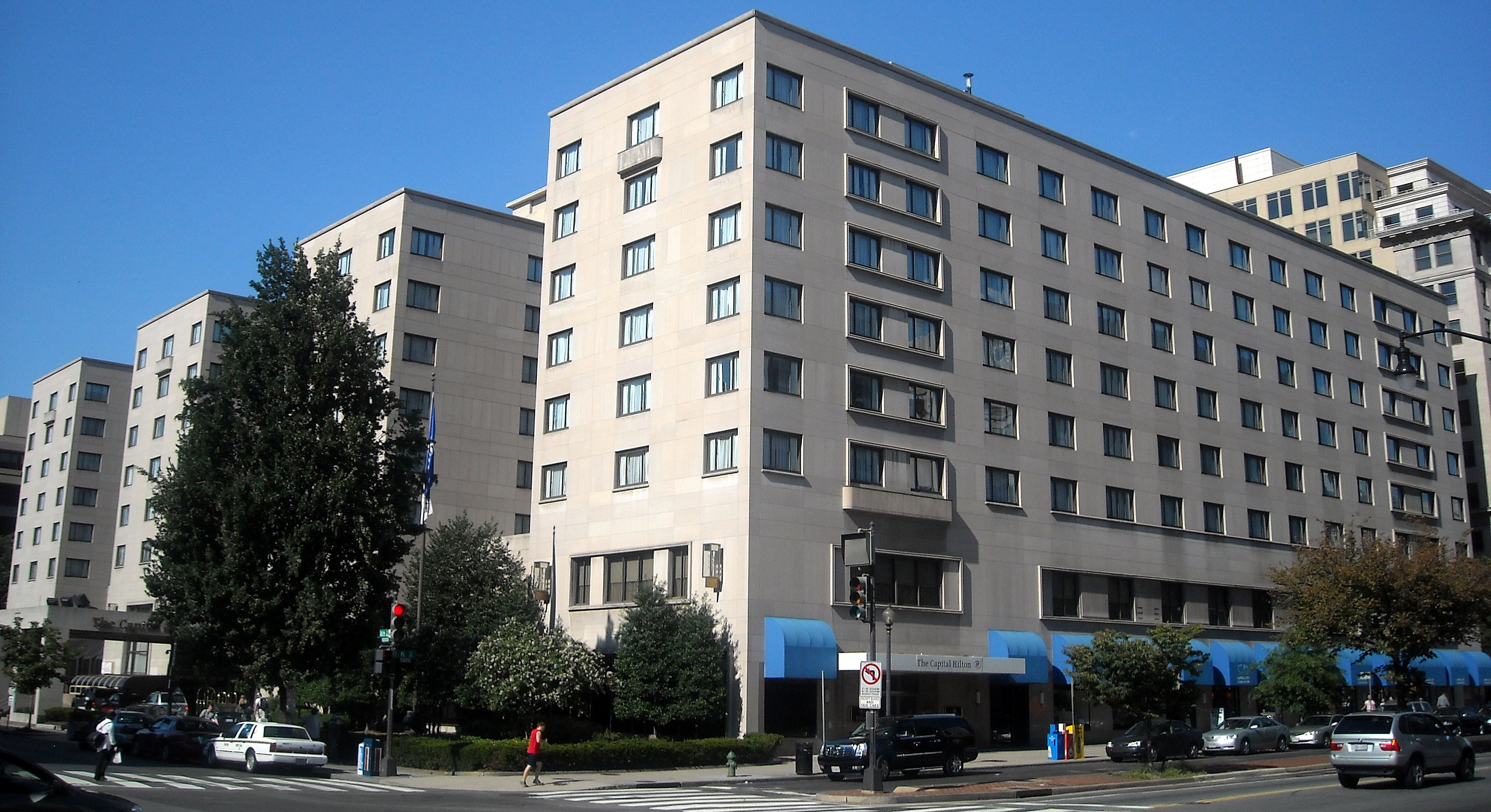
- The Capital Hilton, site of the 64th National Spelling Bee
- Date: May 29–30, 1991
- Location: The Capital Hilton in Washington, D.C.
- Winner: Joanne Lagatta (13 at time of win)
- Sponsor: Wisconsin State Journal
- Sponsor location: Madison, Wisconsin
- Winning word: antipyretic
- No. of contestants: 227
- Pronouncer: Alex Cameron

The 64th Scripps National Spelling Bee was held in Washington, D.C. at the Capital Hilton on May 29–30, 1991, sponsored by the E.W. Scripps Company.

The winner was 13-year-old Joanne Lagatta of Clintonville, Wisconsin, spelling "antipyretic" for the win. Second place went to 11-year-old Maria Mathew of Sterling, Illinois, who missed "inappeteance." The final two girls competed against each other for almost 90 minutes before a winner was crowned.

There were 227 spellers, 113 girls and 114 boys, from age 10-15. Six were appearing for at third time, and 35 were appearing for a second time. Also competing was eighth-grader Dan Feyer from San Francisco, California, who went on to a prolific career as a crossword puzzle solver and editor, winning the American Crossword Puzzle Tournament a record nine times between 2010 and 2023.

The first place prize (in addition to non-cash prizes) was $5,000. Second place received $4,000.

As of 2026, Lagatta is the only Bee winner from Wisconsin.
