= 66th Scripps National Spelling Bee =

Spelling bee held in the United States in 1993

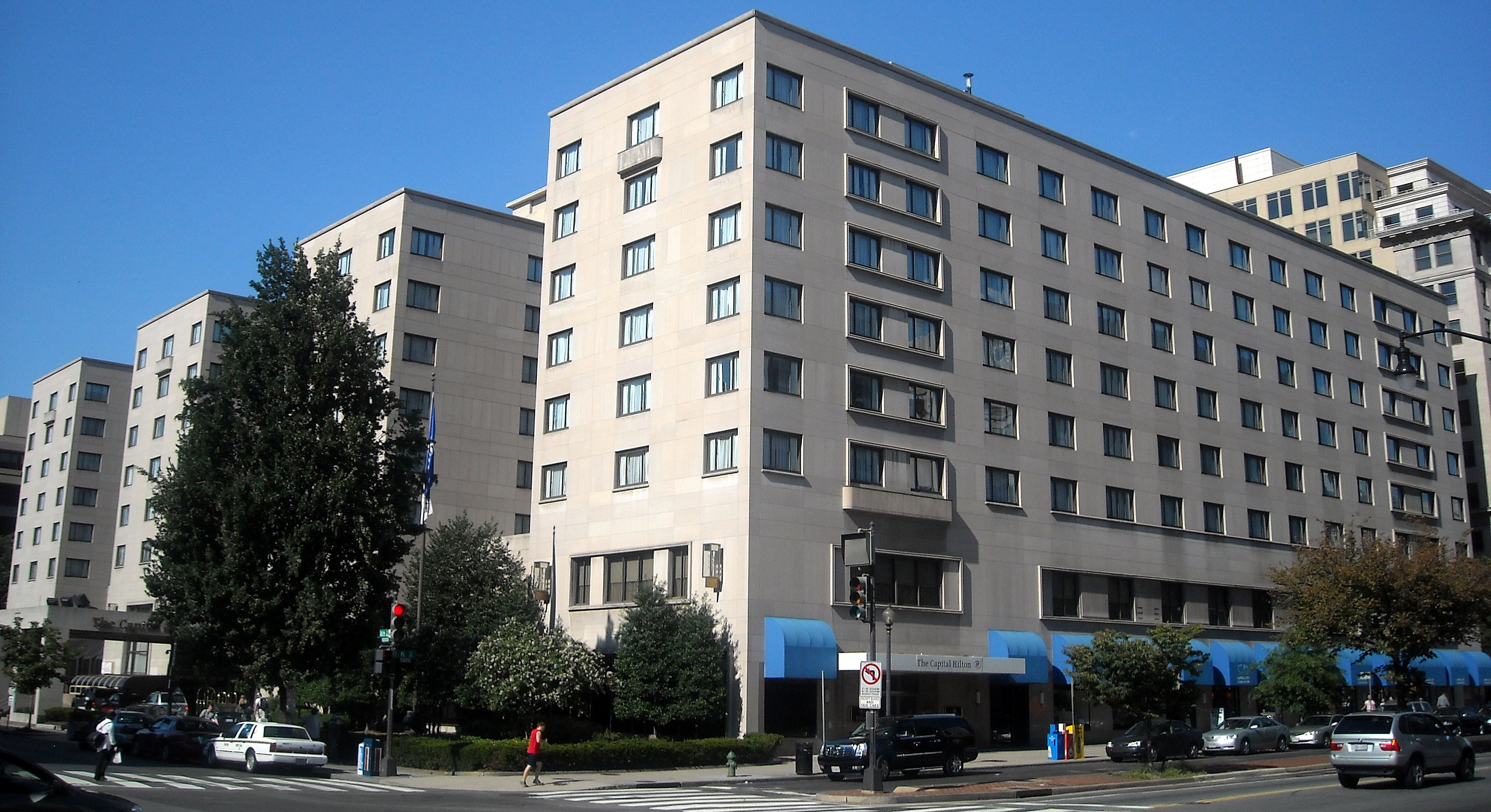
- The Capital Hilton, site of the 66th National Spelling Bee
- Date: June 2–3, 1993
- Location: Capital Hilton in Washington, D.C.
- Winner: Geoff Hooper (14 at time of win)
- Sponsor: The Commercial Appeal
- Sponsor location: Memphis, Tennessee
- Winning word: kamikaze
- No. of contestants: 235
- Pronouncer: Alex Cameron

The 66th Scripps National Spelling Bee was held at the Capital Hilton in Washington, D.C., on June 2–3, 1993, sponsored by the E.W. Scripps Company.

The winner was 14-year-old Geoff Hooper of Arlington, Tennessee, winning with the word "kamikaze" in the 16th round.

Second place went to David Urban, 13, of Amarillo, Texas, who misspelled "renascent" and had finished 66th the prior year, followed by Yuni Kim, 12, of Pottsville, Pennsylvania, in third, who went out on "apotheosize".

Fourth-place went to 9-year-old Wendy Guey, who went on to win three years later.

This year's contest had 235 entrants, including 131 girls and 104 boys, from 49 states as well as the Virgin Islands, Guam, Mexico, Puerto Rico, the District of Columbia, and one entrant from Germany where her father was stationed with the military.

After the first day and three rounds, the competition was reduced by 101 spellers. 69 spellers made it to sixth round, a "killer round" which then eliminated 31 more. 19 spellers were then eliminated in the seventh round. A total of 963 words were used.

The first place prize was $5000, second was $4000, third paid $2500, and fourth $1000.

CNN provided live coverage of the final rounds.
