= All-purpose =

All-purpose may refer to:

- All-purpose cleaner, such as hard-surface cleaner
- All-purpose flour
- All-purpose lightweight individual carrying equipment (ALICE), United States Army standard system of load-carrying equipment
- All-purpose programming language, such as BASIC (Beginners All-purpose Symbolic Instruction Code) and Perl
- All-purpose road, in the United Kingdom, any road that is not a special road
- All-purpose room, such as a family room or living room
- All-purpose yardage, in American football

== See also ==
- All (disambiguation)
- Purpose (disambiguation)
