= 24th Scripps National Spelling Bee =

Spelling bee held in the United States in 1951

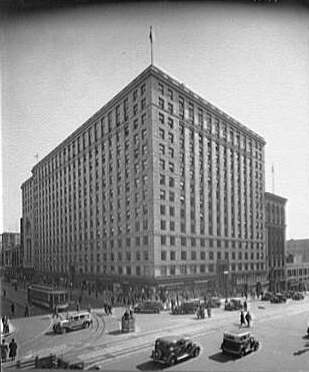
- National Press Building
- Date: May 25, 1951
- Location: Auditorium of the National Press Building, Washington, D.C.
- Winner: Irving Belz (13 at time of win)
- Sponsor: Memphis Press-Scimitar
- Sponsor location: Memphis, Tennessee
- Winning word: insouciant
- No. of contestants: 51
- Pronouncer: Benson S. Alleman

The 24th Scripps National Spelling Bee was held in Washington, District of Columbia on May 25, 1951, sponsored by the E.W. Scripps Company, at the National Press Club.

The winner was 13-year-old Irving Belz of Memphis, Tennessee, sponsored by the Memphis Press-Scimitar, correctly spelling the word insouciant. Michael Aratingi, also 13, of Brooklyn, New York placed second, misspelling cuisine. Mary Anne Bechkowiak (13) of Akron, Ohio placed third, misspelling grosgrain. The top prizes where $500, $300, and $100.

There were 51 contestants this year, 33 girls and 18 boys—4 at age 11, 11 at age 12, 28 at age 13, and 8 at age 14. Three contestants were repeat participants. The competition started at 9:10 am and ended at 3:15 pm, with a 45-minute lunch break and three 5-minute breaks, with a total of 26 rounds and 394 words used.

The winner received $500 and trip to New York (and a stay at the Hotel New Yorker); second place received $300; third got $100; the next 20 spellers received $50, and the last 28 spellers received $40.

Benson S. Alleman was the pronouncer.
