= GTP diphosphokinase =

Class of enzymes

Identifiers
- EC no.: 2.7.6.5
- CAS no.: 63690-89-1

Databases
- IntEnz: IntEnz view
- BRENDA: BRENDA entry
- ExPASy: NiceZyme view
- KEGG: KEGG entry
- MetaCyc: metabolic pathway
- PRIAM: profile
- PDB structures: RCSB PDB PDBe PDBsum
- Gene Ontology: AmiGO / QuickGO
Search
- PMC: articles
- PubMed: articles
- NCBI: proteins

GTP diphosphokinase (EC 2.7.6.5) is an enzyme that catalyzes the chemical reaction

guanosine triphosphate
ATP
AMP
ATP
AMP
guanosine 3'-diphosphate 5'-triphosphate

The enzyme characterised from species of Bacillus converts guanosine triphosphate (GTP) to guanosine 3'-diphosphate 5'-triphosphate by transferring a pyrophosphate group from the cofactor, adenosine triphosphate (ATP), which is converted to adenosine monophosphate (AMP).

== Nomenclature ==
This enzyme is a transferase, specifically one transferring two phosphorus-containing groups (diphosphotransferases). The systematic name of this enzyme class is ATP:GTP 3'-diphosphotransferase. Other names in common use include stringent factor, guanosine 3',5'-polyphosphate synthase, GTP pyrophosphokinase, ATP-GTP 3'-diphosphotransferase, guanosine 5',3'-polyphosphate synthetase, (p)ppGpp synthetase I, (p)ppGpp synthetase II, guanosine pentaphosphate synthetase, GPSI, and GPSII.

== Structural studies ==
As of late 2007, 4 structures have been solved for this class of enzymes, with Protein Data Bank accession codes PDB: 1E3H, PDB: 1E3P, PDB: 1VJ7, and PDB: 2BE3.
