= Single-purpose =

Single-purpose may refer to:

- Singleness of Purpose, principle derived from the Fifth Tradition of Alcoholics Anonymous
- Single-purpose software
- Single-purpose knife, such as fighting knives
- Single-purpose weapon mount, for 5"/38 caliber gun

== See also ==
- Multi-purpose (disambiguation)
- Single (disambiguation)
- Purpose (disambiguation)
- Wikipedia:Single-purpose account
- Single-use
