= Jeep (disambiguation) =

Jeep is a trademarked automotive brand, currently owned by Stellantis.

Jeep or jeep may also refer to:

== Jeep-like vehicles ==
Vehicle concepts

- Four-wheel drive vehicles in general
- Off-road vehicles in general
- Military light utility vehicles in general, or of the 1/4-ton variety more specifically
- In the Philippines, Jeepneys are colloquially referred to as "jeeps."

Specific jeep-type vehicles

- U.S. military jeeps (list)
- Willys MB / Ford GPW jeep and pre-production equivalents – the World War II U.S. four-wheel drive military utility vehicle, manufactured from 1941 to 1945
  - Willys M38, the U.S. military jeep produced from 1949 to 1952
  - Willys M38A1, the U.S. military jeep produced from 1953 to 1971
  - Willys M606, M606A2 and -A3 — military Jeep versions for U.S. allied nations, from 1953 onwards
- Ford GTB 'Burma jeep' / G-622 – a compact, 1 1/2-ton, 4x4, U.S. military truck, from WW II
- Ford Pygmy, Ford's first prototype for the U.S. Army's requirement for the World War II light reconnaissance vehicle
- Ford M151, the replacement for the U.S. military Willys jeeps, produced from 1959 to 1988, and used through the 1990s
- M422 Mighty Mite, a U.S. military jeep small enough to be lifted by men or helicopters, produced from 1959 to 1962
- Dodge ½-ton VC and WC series – at least in some U.S. military branches, these were initially called "jeeps", before the quarter-ton Willys MB and Ford GPW
- Jeep CJ (originally Willys CJ, or Civilian Jeep), civilian version of the U.S. military Jeep
- Jeep Wrangler, a successor to the Jeep CJ
- Jeeps built by other companies, either by joint-venture, or with or without a license from Jeep

== Other vehicles and craft ==
- Curtiss-Wright AT-9 Jeep, a WWII American military aircraft
- Escort carrier – a small, anti-submarine, escort aircraft carrier was called a "jeep carrier" in the U.S. Navy in WW II
- Minneapolis-Moline UTX and NTX 4x4 tractors (1940–1944) were called 'jeeps'
- NCC Class WT, a Northern Irish locomotive class; nicknamed 'jeeps'

== People ==
- Glenn Davis (athlete) (1934–2009), American Olympic athlete and NFL wide receiver nicknamed "Jeep"
- Jeep Swenson (1957–1997), an American wrestler and actor
- Johnny Hodges (1906–1970), an American jazz saxophonist nicknamed "Jeep"

== Other uses ==
- Just Enough Education to Perform, an album by Stereophonics
- Jeep cap, a US Army issued wool knit cap generally like a toboggan cap
- Eugene the Jeep, a fictional character in the Thimble Theatre and Popeye comic strips
- Joint Emergency Evacuation Plan (to guarantee Continuity of government)

== See also ==
- Geep (disambiguation)
- General purpose (disambiguation)
- GP (disambiguation)
