= Multi-purpose =

Multi-purpose may refer to:

== Buildings ==
- Arena
- Auditorium
- Civic center
- Coliseum
- Convention center
- Facility
- Gymnasium, also called "Multi-Purpose Room" (MPR)
- Multi-purpose stadium
- Music venue
- Sports venue

== Vehicles ==
- Multi-Purpose Crew Vehicle, spacecraft
- Multi-purpose helicopter
- Multi-Purpose Logistics Module, Space Shuttle cargo container
- Multi-purpose vehicle, minivan
- Multi-purpose vessel, cargo ship/freighter

== Other uses ==
- Multi-Purpose Food
- Multi-purpose reef
- Multi-purpose tool
- Multipurpose tree
- Multi-Purpose Viewer, a software program
- Raufoss Mk 211, armor-piercing ammunition commonly known as Multipurpose.

== See also ==
- Single-purpose (disambiguation)
- Purpose (disambiguation)
