= Inauguration of John F. Kennedy =

44th United States presidential inauguration

Presidential inauguration of John F. Kennedy
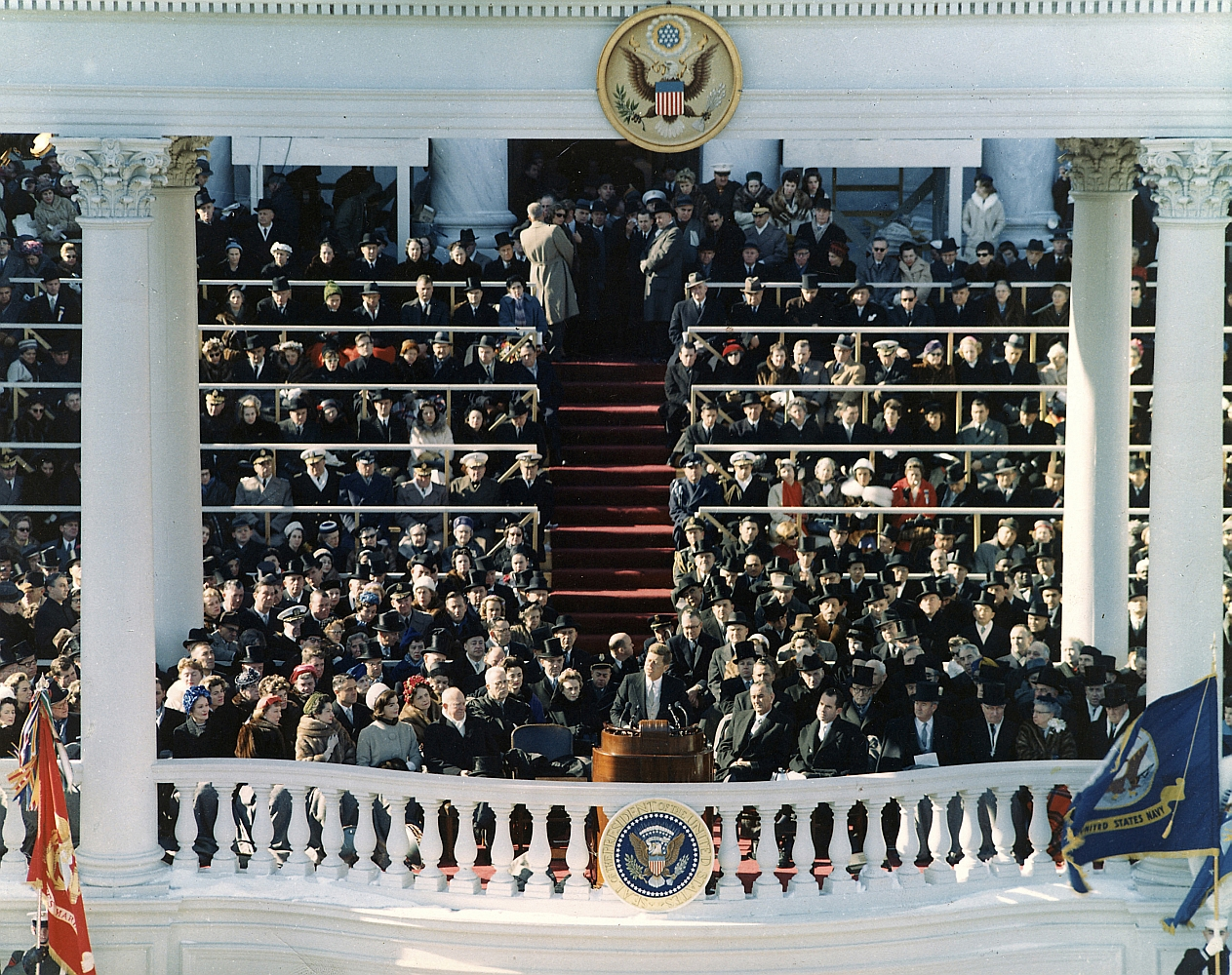
- Date: January 20, 1961; 65 years ago
- Location: United States Capitol, Washington, D.C.
- Organized by: Joint Congressional Committee on Inaugural Ceremonies
- Participants: John F. Kennedy; 35th president of the United States — Assuming office Earl Warren; Chief Justice of the United States — Administering oath Lyndon B. Johnson; 37th vice president of the United States — Assuming office Sam Rayburn; Speaker of the United States House of Representatives — Administering oath

The inauguration of John F. Kennedy as the 35th president of the United States was held on Friday, January 20, 1961, at the East Portico of the United States Capitol in Washington, D.C. This was the 44th inauguration and marked the commencement of the only term of both Kennedy as president and Lyndon B. Johnson as vice president.

Kennedy had narrowly defeated Richard Nixon, the incumbent vice president, in the presidential election. Kennedy was the first Catholic to become president, the youngest person elected to the office, and the first person born in the 20th century to serve as U.S. president.

His inaugural address encompassed the major themes of his campaign and would define his presidency during a time of economic prosperity, emerging social changes, and diplomatic challenges. This inauguration was the first in which a poet, Robert Frost, participated in the program.

For this inauguration, the Joint Congressional Committee on Inaugural Ceremonies was chaired by Senator John Sparkman, and included Senators Carl Hayden and Styles Bridges, and Representatives Sam Rayburn, John W. McCormack, and Charles A. Halleck.

== Sinatra inaugural ball ==
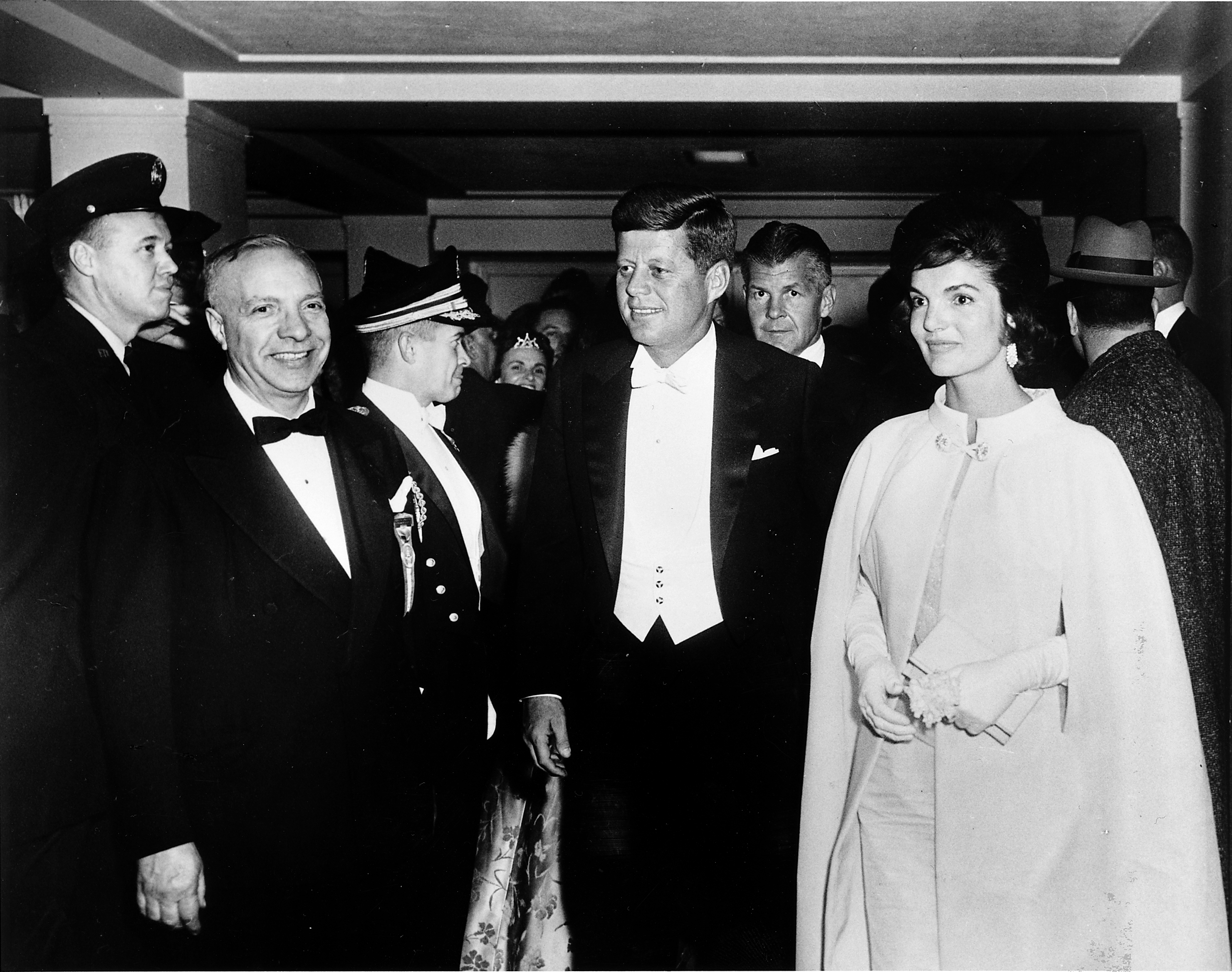
President John F. Kennedy and First Lady Jacqueline Kennedy, wearing a gown designed by Ethel Franken of Bergdorf Goodman, arrive at inaugural ball on the evening of Inauguration Day.

[Sinatra's ball] may have marked the moment when popular entertainment became an indispensable part of modern politics.

— Todd S. Purdum, Vanity Fair, Feb. 2011

Frank Sinatra and Peter Lawford organized and hosted a pre-inaugural ball at the D.C. Armory on the eve of Inauguration day, January 19, 1961, considered one of the biggest parties ever held in the history of Washington, D.C. Sinatra recruited many Hollywood stars who performed and attended, and went as far as convincing Broadway theatres to suspend their shows for the night to accommodate some of their actors attending the gala. With tickets ranging from $100 per person to $10,000 per group, Sinatra hoped to raise $1.7 million ($18.3 million in today's dollars) for the Democratic Party to eliminate its debt brought on by a hard-fought campaign. Many Hollywood stars gave brief speeches or performed acts, rehearsed by Kay Thompson and directed by Roger Edens, and stayed at the Statler-Hilton Hotel where preparations and rehearsals were photographed by Phil Stern. Performances and speeches included Fredric March, Sidney Poitier, Nat King Cole, Ella Fitzgerald, Gene Kelly, Tony Curtis, Janet Leigh, Bill Dana, Milton Berle, Jimmy Durante, Harry Belafonte, and Sinatra himself.

Sammy Davis Jr., a long-time friend of Sinatra, supporter of the Democratic Party, and member of the Rat Pack, was asked by John F. Kennedy not to attend the gala at the behest of his father Joseph, fearing that his interracial marriage to Swedish actress May Britt was too controversial for the time and occasion, much to Sammy's and Sinatra's dismay. Davis had already postponed his wedding to Britt until after the election, also at the request of the Kennedy campaign via Sinatra. Davis eventually switched his support to the Republican Party and Richard Nixon in the early 1970s. Harry Belafonte expressed sadness at the controversy, stating "It was the ambassador, [but] we didn't know that until after. Sammy not being there was a loss."

At the end of the ball, Kennedy spoke to thank Sinatra on the festivities and his support of the Democratic Party throughout his life and the 1960 campaign, adding "The happy relationship between the arts and politics which has characterized our long history I think reached culmination tonight." Jacqueline retired to the White House before the ball ended at 1:30 am (ET), and John went to a second pre-inaugural ball hosted by his father Joseph Kennedy, and would finally return to the White House at around 3:30 am.

== The inaugural nor'easter ==
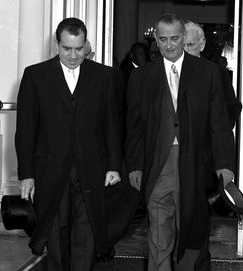
Nixon and successor Johnson on Inauguration Day

A major winter storm occurred the day before the inauguration, with temperatures at 20 °F (−7 °C) and snowfall at 1–2 inches (2.5–5.1 cm) per hour and a total of 8 inches (20 cm) during the night, causing transportation and logistical problems in Washington and serious concern for the inauguration.

On inauguration day, January 20, 1961, the skies began to clear but the snow created chaos in Washington, almost canceling the inaugural parade. The U.S. Army Corps of Engineers was put in charge of clearing the streets during the evening and morning before the inauguration, and were assisted by more than 1,000 District of Columbia employees and 1,700 Boy Scouts. This task force employed hundreds of dump trucks, front-end loaders, sanders, plows, rotaries, and flamethrowers to clear the route. Over 1,400 cars which had been stranded due to the conditions and lack of fuel had to be removed from the parade route along Pennsylvania Avenue.

The snowstorm dropped visibility at Washington National Airport to less than half a mile, preventing former president Herbert Hoover from flying into Washington and attending the inauguration.

== Inauguration proceedings ==
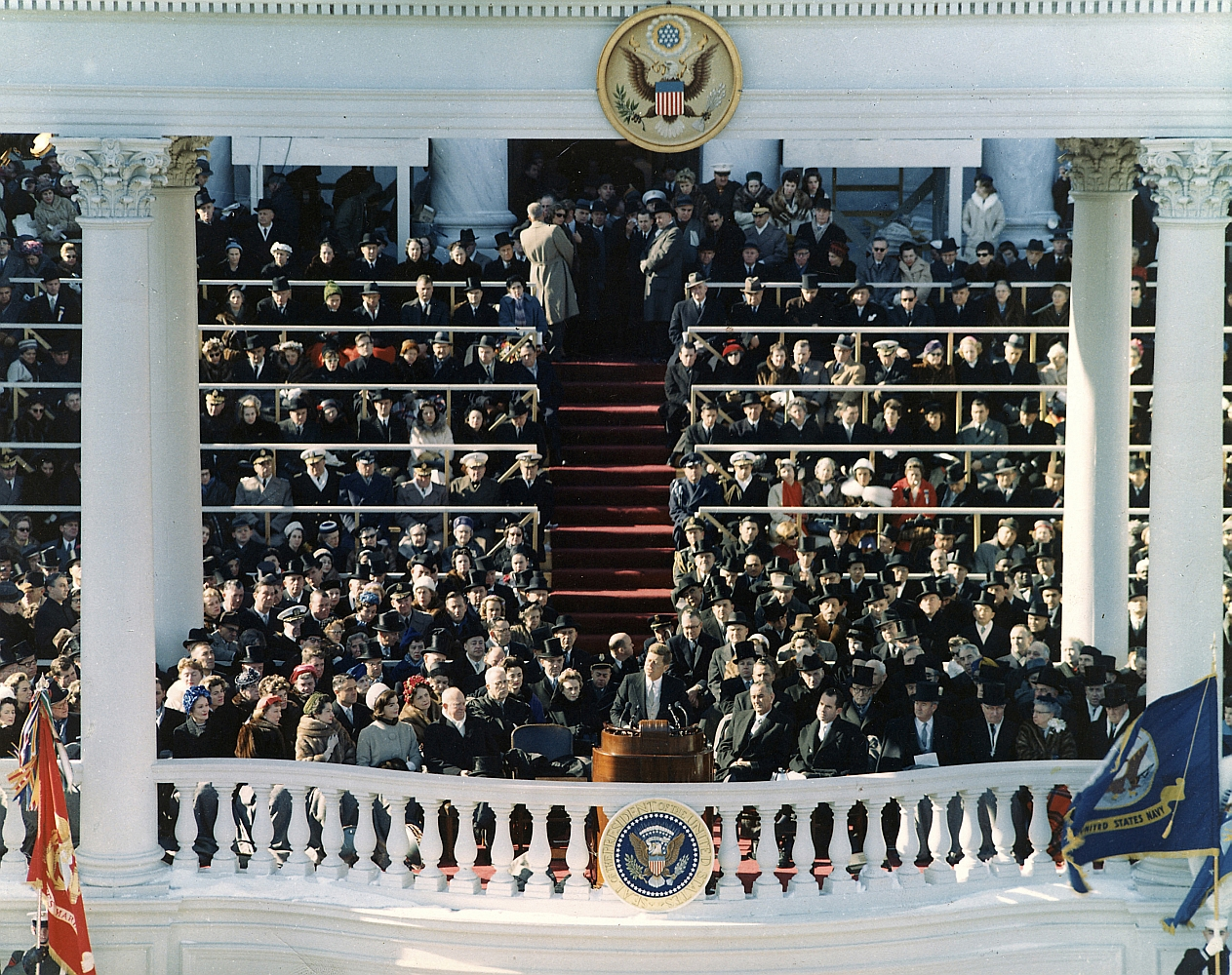
View of the extended East Front of the Capitol where the inauguration was held. President Kennedy is in the center delivering his inaugural address, with Vice President Johnson and official and invited guests sitting behind him.

President Kennedy's was the last inauguration that had a fully formal dress code. And despite his personal aversion to hats, Kennedy opted to wear the then customary black top hat. As of 2025, this was the last time a president has worn one to the inaugural ceremony.

Before proceeding to the Capitol in company with outgoing president Dwight D. Eisenhower, Kennedy went to a morning Mass at Holy Trinity Catholic Church in Georgetown. Cardinal Richard Cushing gave the invocation at the inaugural which lasted for 12 minutes. Additional prayers were recited by Archbishop Iakovos of the Greek Orthodox Church and Reverend Dr. John Barclay of the Central Christian Church of Austin, Texas, and a blessing was offered by Rabbi Nelson Glueck. The invocation and prayers lasted a total of 28 minutes. Marian Anderson sang "The Star-Spangled Banner", and a composition by Leonard Bernstein titled "Fanfare for the Inauguration of John F. Kennedy" was played.

The oath of office for vice president was administered by Speaker of the House of Representatives Sam Rayburn to Lyndon Johnson. This marked the first time a House speaker administered the oath, which had been given in previous inaugurations by either the president pro tempore of the United States Senate, the outgoing vice president, or a United States senator.

Robert Frost, then 86 years old, recited his poem "The Gift Outright". Kennedy requested Frost to read a poem at the inauguration, suggesting "The Gift Outright", considered an act of gratitude towards Frost for his help during the campaign. Kennedy would later state that he admired the "courage, the towering skill and daring" of Frost, and adding that "I've never taken the view the world of politics and the world of poetry are so far apart. I think politicians and poets share at least one thing, and that is their greatness depends upon the courage with which they face the challenges of life." American poet William Meredith would say that the request "focused attention on Kennedy as a man of culture, as a man interested in culture."

For John F. Kennedy His Inauguration

The glory of a next Augustan age
Of a power leading from its strength and pride,
Of young ambition eager to be tried,
Firm in our free beliefs without dismay,
In any game the nations want to play.
A golden age of poetry and power
Of which this noonday's the beginning hour.

— Closing seven lines from Robert Frost's poem
"For John F. Kennedy His Inauguration",
the expanded version of "Dedication".

Frost composed a new poem titled Dedication specifically for the ceremony as a preface to the poem Kennedy suggested, to the surprise of Kennedy's friends. On the morning of the inauguration, Frost asked Stewart Udall, Kennedy's future Secretary of the Interior, to have his handwritten draft type scripted for easier reading, to which Udall obliged.

Once at the presidential podium, however, the glare of the sun and snow prevented him from reading his papers. When Frost started reading, he stumbled on the first three lines, squinting at his papers in view of the crowd and cameras. Vice President Johnson tried to assist by using his top hat as a shade, however Frost waved the offer aside, took the hat and jokingly said "I'll help you with that", sparking laughter and applause from the crowd and President Kennedy. Understanding the immediacy of the situation, Frost stated to the microphones that "this [the poem] was to have been a preface to a poem which I do not have to read", and began to recite "The Gift Outright" from memory before the "nearly one million people in the nation's capital". This marks the first time a poem was read at a presidential inauguration, a feature repeated by future presidents Bill Clinton (1993 and 1997), Barack Obama (2009 and 2013), and Joe Biden (2021) at their respective ceremonies.

Frost gave the type scripted version of the undelivered "Dedication" poem to Udall after the ceremony, who eventually donated the document to the Library of Congress where it is stored today. The original manuscript version, personally dedicated by Frost, was provided to the president and currently held by the John F. Kennedy Presidential Library. Kennedy's wife Jacqueline framed this manuscript version, writing on the back of the frame: For Jack. First thing I had framed to be put in your office. First thing to be hung there. Frost officially presented the poem, retitled to For John F. Kennedy His Inauguration and expanded from 42 to 77 lines, to Kennedy in March 1962. The unread poem (published in 1962 as part of Frost's In the Clearing poetry collection) was finally recited at the U.S. Capitol by Chaplain Daniel P. Coughlin during the 50th anniversary celebrations of Kennedy's inauguration.

=== Oath of office ===
The oath of office of the president was administered to Kennedy by Chief Justice Earl Warren using a closed family Bible at 12:51 (ET) although he officially became president at the stroke of noon. Kennedy did not wear an overcoat when taking the oath of office and delivering the inaugural address, despite the cold conditions of 22 °F (−6 °C) with windchill at 7 °F (−14 °C) at noon.

== Inaugural address ==
Video of John F. Kennedy being sworn in as thirty-fifth president of the United States, and delivering his inaugural address.

Inaugural address of John F. Kennedy
Audio of John F. Kennedy giving his inaugural address. (Duration:14 minutes)

Immediately after reciting the oath of office, President Kennedy turned to address the crowd gathered at the Capitol. His 1366-word inaugural address, the first delivered to a televised audience in color, is considered one of the best presidential inaugural speeches in American history.

Let the word go forth from this time and place, to friend and foe alike, that the torch has been passed to a new generation of Americans—born in this century, tempered by war, disciplined by a hard and bitter peace, proud of our ancient heritage—and unwilling to witness or permit the slow undoing of those human rights to which this nation has always been committed, and to which we are committed today at home and around the world.

And so, my fellow Americans: ask not what your country can do for you—ask what you can do for your country.

=== Drafting ===
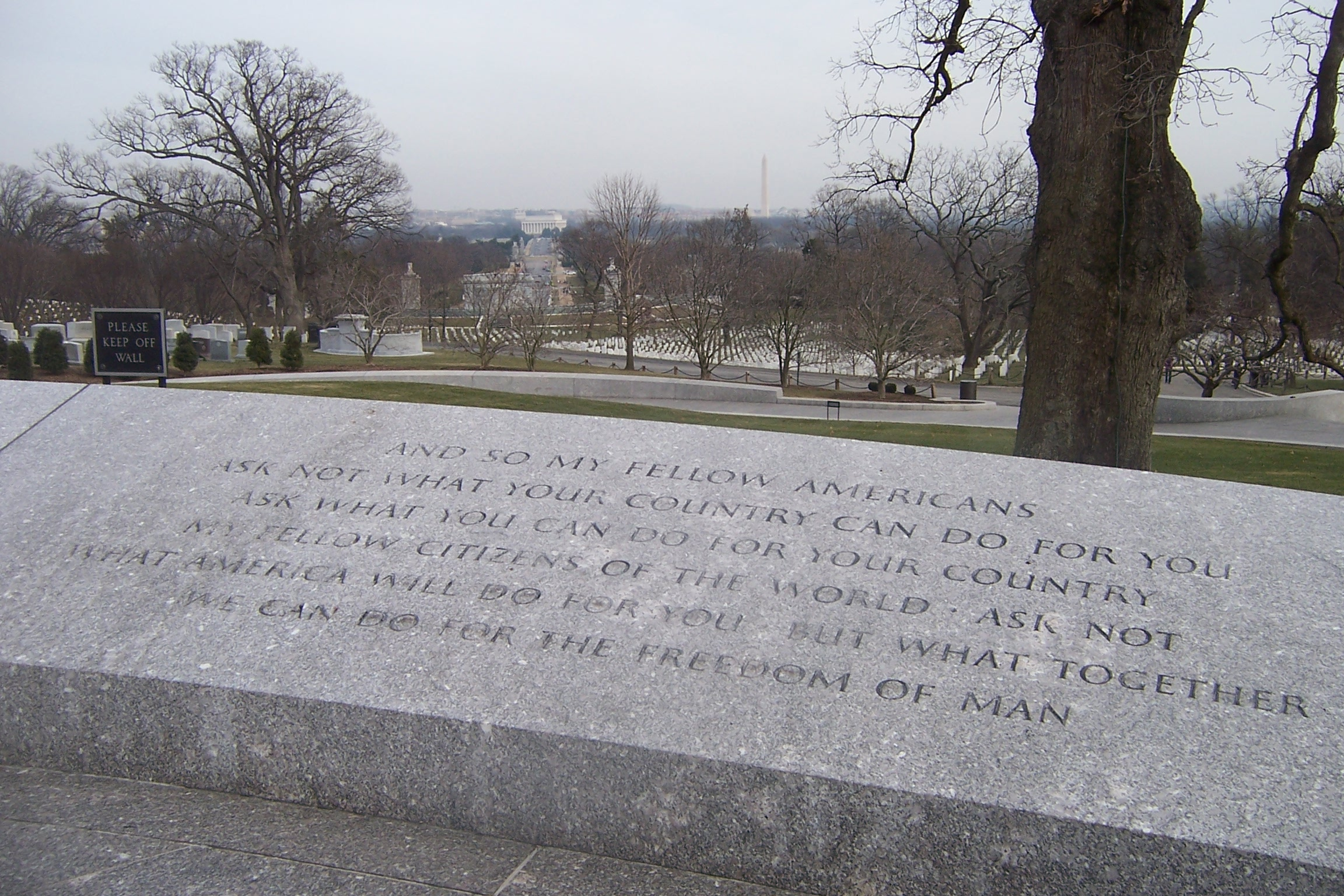
The most famous passage from the inaugural address is etched in stone at Kennedy's gravesite in Arlington National Cemetery, with the Lincoln Memorial and Washington Monument in the background.

The speech was crafted by Kennedy and his speech writer Ted Sorensen. Kennedy had Sorensen study President Abraham Lincoln's Gettysburg Address as well as other inaugural speeches. Kennedy began collecting thoughts and ideas for his inauguration speech in late November 1960. He took suggestions from various friends, aides and counselors, including suggestions from clergymen for biblical quotations. Kennedy then made several drafts using his own thoughts and some of those suggestions. Kennedy included in his speech several suggestions made by Harvard economist John Kenneth Galbraith and by the former Democratic presidential candidate Adlai Stevenson II. Kennedy's line "Let us never negotiate out of fear. But let us never fear to negotiate." is nearly identical to Galbraith's suggestion "We shall never negotiate out of fear. But we shall never fear to negotiate." Stevenson's suggestion "if the free way of life doesn't help the many poor of this world it will never save the few rich." was the basis for Kennedy's line "If a free society cannot help the many who are poor, it cannot save the few who are rich."

=== Main ideas of the speech ===
Kennedy came into power at the height of the Cold War with the difficult goals of maintaining peaceful international relations and representing the United States as a strong global force. These themes dominated his inaugural address. Kennedy highlighted the newly discovered dangers of nuclear power and the accelerating arms race, making the point that a focus on firepower should be replaced with a focus on international relations and helping the impoverished of the world. According to speechwriter Ted Sorensen, the most important sentence in the speech, expressing the core of Kennedy's policy, was: "For only when our arms are sufficient beyond doubt can we be certain beyond doubt that they will never be employed." Sorensen revealed in 2007 that John F. Kennedy had five objectives in mind with his speech, all of which, according to Sorensen, were achieved. Sorensen called Kennedy's speech "wise and courageous" and concluded: "Kennedy's inaugural address was world-changing, heralding the commencement of a new American administration and foreign policy determined upon a peaceful victory in the west's long cold war struggle with the Soviet Union over the world's future direction. [...] It was a statement of core values - his and the nation's at that time - that he very much believed needed to be conveyed."

=== Rhetorical elements ===
The central theme of the speech is the relationship between duty and power. This is emphasized by the strong use of juxtaposition in the first part of the speech: "... Man holds in his mortal hands the power to abolish all forms of human poverty and all forms of human life". Similarly, in the fifth passage, he says: "United there is little we cannot do in a host of cooperative ventures. Divided there is little we can do." Both passages appeal to the idea of refocusing international values. Again, after exhorting "both sides" to action, he calls on all of "us" "to bear the burden of a long twilight struggle ... against the common enemies of man: tyranny, poverty, disease, and war itself," though the phrase "long twilight struggle" came to be associated with the Cold War struggle against communism.

Kairos – to say or do what is fitting in a given situation – is a main component of classical rhetoric and is used prominently in this address. Kennedy recognized the American people's anxiety about the Cold War and chose an optimistic tone. He accomplishes this by talking about the future, and repeats the phrase "Let both sides ..." to indicate a way to deal with strained relations while appealing to the goal of international unity. He also phrases negative ideas as opportunities—a challenge, appealing to innately American ideals. In the fourth from last passage he states, "In the long history of the world, only a few generations have been granted the role of defending freedom in its hour of maximum danger".

It was also in his inaugural address that John F. Kennedy spoke his famous words, "ask not what your country can do for you, ask what you can do for your country." This use of antimetabole can be seen even as a thesis statement of his speech—a call to action for the public to do what is right for the greater good. This may be an elegant rephrasing of Franklin D. Roosevelt's acceptance speech at the 1936 Democratic National Convention: "To some generations much is given. Of other generations much is expected. This generation of Americans has a rendezvous with destiny." It is also similar to Supreme Court justice Oliver Wendell Holmes' 1884 Memorial Day speech, in which Holmes said, "[Memorial Day] is now the moment when by common consent we pause to become conscious of our national life and to rejoice in it, to recall what our country has done for each of us, and to ask ourselves what we can do for the country in return."

== Invited guests ==
Approximately 125,000 calligraphic invitations were prepared by a team led by Fay King Imhoff. Along with official presidential guests and honorees, including former presidents, vice presidents, cabinet members, and other Washington officials, the Kennedys invited famous men and women of the arts, including Carl Sandburg, John Steinbeck, Ernest Hemingway, Brendan Behan, Mark Rothko, and fashion icon and future Vogue editor Diana Vreeland.

Congressman Tip O'Neill sat next to wealthy Boston businessman George Kara:

O'Neill recalled that Kara had nudged him and said, "Years from now, historians will wonder what was on the young man's mind as he strode to take his oath of office. I bet he's asking himself how George Kara got such a good seat." That night, O'Neill and his wife danced over to the president's box at the ball in the Mayflower Hotel to congratulate him, and sure enough, Kennedy asked, "Was that George Kara sitting beside you?" O'Neill told Kennedy what Kara had said, and J.F.K. replied, "Tip, you'll never believe it. I had my left hand on the Bible and my right hand in the air, and I was about to take the oath of office, and I said to myself, 'How the hell did Kara get that seat?'"

=== Former presidents and first ladies in attendance ===
- Dwight and Mamie Eisenhower
- Harry and Bess Truman
- Eleanor Roosevelt
- Edith Wilson

== Parade to the White House ==
A vast parade along Pennsylvania Avenue followed the inauguration ceremony, bearing the new president from Capitol Plaza to the White House. Upon his arrival, Kennedy mounted a reviewing stand shared with honored guests such as former president Harry Truman and former first ladies Edith Wilson and Eleanor Roosevelt. Throngs of onlookers and millions of television viewers also watched the procession; it took three hours to pass by. Sixteen thousand members of the US armed forces marched with displays of modern weaponry like the Minuteman missile and the supersonic B-70 bomber. A further sixteen thousand marchers were civilians ranging from federal and state officials to high school bands and Boy Scouts, accompanied by forty floats.

== Impact ==
Kennedy's inauguration marked many firsts for the United States. Kennedy was the first Catholic inaugurated as commander-in-chief. At the inauguration, Kennedy, then 43, was the youngest elected president and was replacing the oldest president in American history at that time, Eisenhower. The age difference and visual impact of the turnover from Eisenhower's presence to Kennedy's was noticeable at the inauguration. In addition, Kennedy was the first person born in the 20th century to have been inaugurated as president.

The claim that Kennedy did not wear a hat to his inauguration, and so single-handedly killed the men's hat industry, is false. Kennedy wore a top hat to the inauguration and to the balls in the evening, removing it only to be sworn in and give his address. He in fact restored the tradition, after Eisenhower broke with it by wearing a homburg instead of a top hat to both of his inaugurations. Johnson, at his inauguration in 1965, was the first president to go completely hatless.

== Bibliography ==
- Clarke, Thurston (2004). Ask Not: The Inauguration of John F. Kennedy and the Speech That Changed America. New York: Henry Holt and Co. ISBN 0-8050-7213-6.
- Rhetorical Terms and Techniques of Persuasion from Kennedy’s Inaugural Address . United States Department of Education and Public Programs, John F. Kennedy Presidential Library and Museum.
