= On Purpose =

On Purpose may refer to:

- On Purpose (album), by Clint Black
- "On Purpose", a song by Sabrina Carpenter from the 2016 album Evolution
- "On Purpose", a song by Chris Brown from the 2017 album Heartbreak on a Full Moon
- On Purpose, a podcast hosted by Jay Shetty
