= GP =

GP may refer to:

== Arts, entertainment, and media ==
=== Gaming ===
- Gameplanet (New Zealand), a New Zealand video game community
- GamePolitics.com, a blog about the politics of computer and video games
- GamePro, a monthly video game magazine
- Gold Piece, the currency unit in many role-playing games
- Mario Kart Arcade GP, a 2005 arcade game

=== Music ===
- GP (album), the first solo album by Gram Parsons
- General Public, a UK band of the 1980s and 1990s
- a stave annotation denoting a rest for the entire orchestra
- Government Plates, 2013 studio album by hip-hop band Death Grips
- "On GP", a song on The Powers That B by hip-hop band Death Grips
- General principle, a term used in hip hop

=== Other media ===
- GP, a rating for films in the early 1970s, eventually changed to "PG" by the MPAA
- G.P., 1989-1996, an Australian television medical drama series
- Göteborgs-Posten, a daily Swedish newspaper

== In business and finance ==
=== Terminology ===
- General partner, one with equal responsibility and liability for an enterprise
- Gross profit, an accounting term
- General practice, a term used in construction surveying

=== Businesses and brands ===
- Model GP, for General Purpose tractor, built by Deere & Company
- Georgia-Pacific LLC, a manufacturer, and marketer of tissue, packaging, paper, pulp, and building products
- Girard-Perregaux, a luxury brand of Swiss watches
- Gold Peak, a manufacturer of batteries and portable solar chargers
- Google+, a social media service by Google
- Grameenphone, a telecommunications service provider in Bangladesh
- Jeep, an automobile marque

== Mathematics, science, and technology ==
=== Biology, biochemistry, and medicine ===
- GP (journal), a journal now known as American Family Physician
- Gastroparesis, a medical condition
- General practitioner, in medicine, a doctor who treats acute and chronic illnesses and provides preventive care and health education to patients
- Glans penis, the sensitive bulbous structure at the distal end of the penis
- Globus pallidus, a subcortical structure of the brain
- Glycerate 3-phosphate, a 3-carbon molecule
- Glycoprotein, proteins that contain oligosaccharide chains (glycans) covalently attached to polypeptide side-chains
- Gutta-percha, used in endodontic treatment to obturate root canals
- Glecaprevir/pibrentasvir, medication used to treat hepatitis C

=== Computing ===
- .gp, the Internet top-level domain for Guadeloupe
- Genetic programming, an algorithmic technique in computer science
- Geometric programming, an algorithmic technique in engineering and optimization
- Gigapixel image, a unit of computer graphic resolution
- Goal programming, a branch of multiple objective programming
- Grandparent post, a reference to the message two levels up in a threaded message board
- Guitar Pro, a music composing program
- Gurupa, Amazon.com's content delivery infrastructure
- Microsoft Dynamics GP, part of Microsoft Dynamics accounting software Great Plains
- PARI/GP, a computer algebra system

=== Weapons ===
- GP-25 or GP-30, two series of Russian under-barrel grenade launchers
- Grande Puissance (French for "High Power"), original Belgian name for the Browning Hi-Power
- L98A1 Cadet GP rifle

=== Other uses in maths, science, and technology ===
- Gaussian process, a stochastic process associated with the Gaussian probability distribution
- Geometric progression, a sequence of numbers in mathematics
- Poorly graded gravels, in the Unified Soil Classification System
- Ground plane, in electrical engineering
- Guide Point, on Ordnance Survey maps

== Places ==
=== United States ===
- Grand Prairie, Texas
- Grants Pass, Oregon
- Grosse Pointe, Michigan

=== Elsewhere ===
- Garrison of Porsanger, a military garrison in Finnmark, Norway
- Gauteng, a province in South Africa
- Göppingen, a city in Germany (license plate prefix)
- Grande Prairie, a city in Alberta, Canada
- Guadeloupe, a French island in the Caribbean (by international country code)
- Rajgangpur railway station (station code: GP), Odisha, India

== Politics ==
- Civic Platform (Građanska platforma), a political organization in Serbia
- Green party, a formally organized political party based on the principles of Green politics
- Young Party (Genç Parti), a Turkish political party

== Sport ==
- Games played, in sports statistics
- Gary Payton (born 1968), nine-time NBA All-Star point guard, nicknamed "The Glove"
- GlobalPort Batang Pier, a team in the Philippine Basketball Association
- Grand Prix (disambiguation), French for "Grand Prize", used in several sports
- Guinness Premiership, an English rugby competition
- Gianpiero Lambiase, often known as GP, a British race engineer in Formula 1

== Other uses ==
- Garden-path sentence, a linguistic concept
- Great Pyrenees, a dog breed used as livestock guardians
- General Paper, a GCE 'A' Level examination subject in Singapore

== See also ==
- PG (disambiguation)
- Jeep (disambiguation)
