= 69th Scripps National Spelling Bee =

Spelling bee held in the United States in 1996

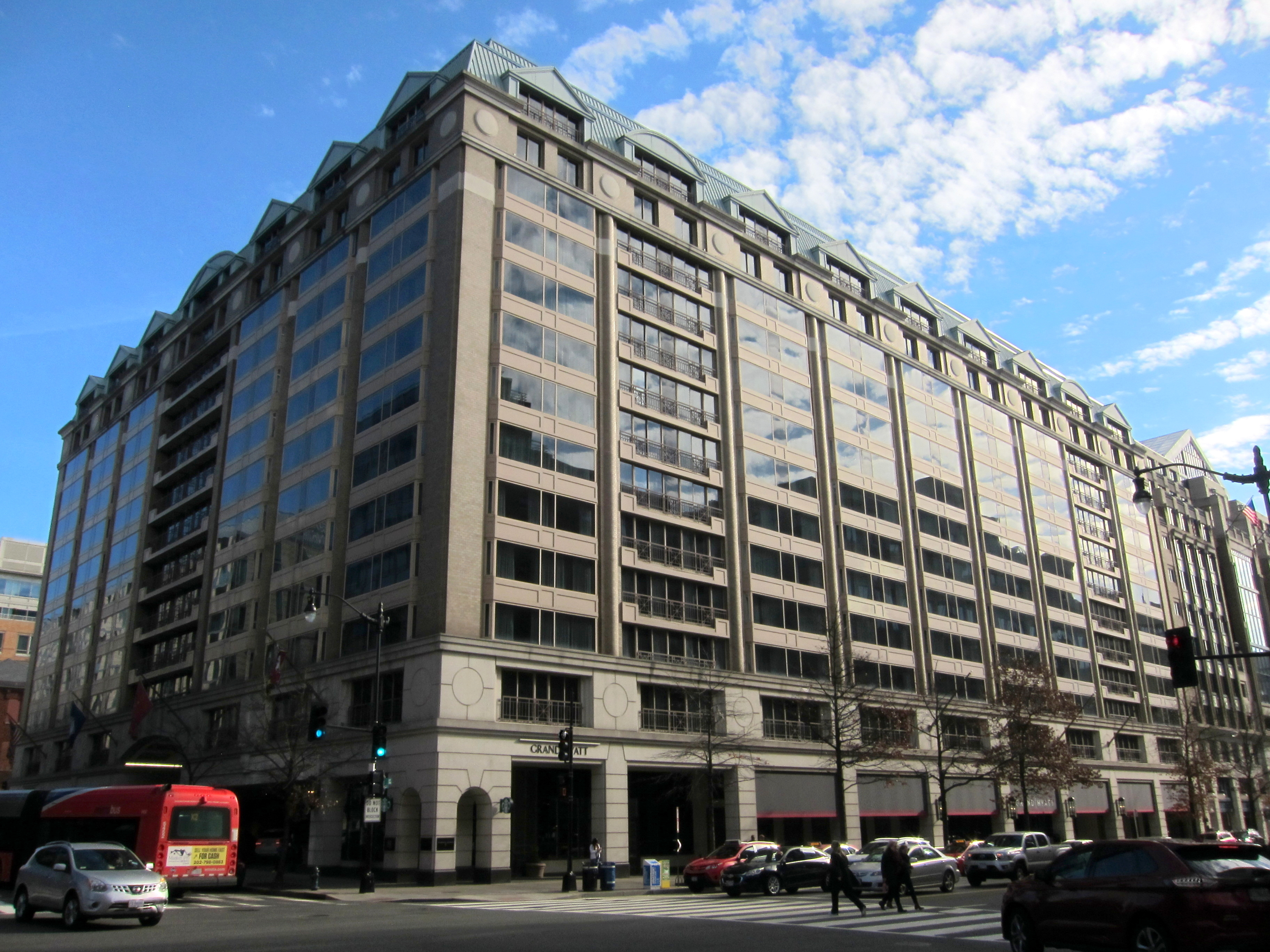
- The Grand Hyatt Washington in Washington, D.C., hosted the Scripps National Spelling Bee.
- Date: May 29–30, 1996
- Location: Grand Hyatt Washington in Washington, D.C.
- Winner: Wendy Guey (12 at time of win)
- Sponsor: The Palm Beach Post
- Sponsor location: West Palm Beach, Florida
- Winning word: vivisepulture
- No. of contestants: 247
- Pronouncer: Alex Cameron

The 69th Scripps National Spelling Bee was held at Grand Hyatt Washington in Washington, D.C., on May 29–30, 1996, sponsored by the E.W. Scripps Company.

Twelve-year-old Wendy Guey, from West Palm Beach, Florida, won the competition by correctly spelling the word "vivisepulture." This was Guey's fourth Bee; her previous best was fourth place in the 1993 Bee. Second place went to 13-year-old Nikki Dowdy of Houston, Texas, who missed "cervicorn."

There were 247 participants, 51% of them female, with about one-fourth coming from a private or parochial school, and 12 from a home-schooling environment.

The Bee featured two spellers marking firsts for the competition: Amanda Burke of Gate City, Virginia, became the Bee's first ever five-year repeater, and Jimmy McCarthy of Land O'Lakes, Florida, was its first deaf competitor.
