= The Gift Outright =

Poem

"The Gift Outright" is a poem written by Robert Frost. Frost originally recited it at the College of William & Mary in 1941, but its most famous recitation occurred at the inauguration of John F. Kennedy in 1961.

== Publication ==
The poem was first published in the Virginia Quarterly Review in Spring of 1942. It was collected in Frost's volume A Witness Tree in 1943. According to Jeffrey S. Cramer the poem may have been written as early as 1936. Frost was a big lover of his country, and wrote many poems about American life, culture, beliefs, etc. "His poem, ‘The Gift Outright', reveals his patriotic fervor and presents the history of his country since the days of colonialism." Frost meant this poem to be a symbol of patriotism in hard times. Surrounding current events in the world may have contributed to the creation of the poem, such as the Great Depression and World War II. The poem may have been written as a tribute to the country's worth and the hopefully growing economy.

== Interpretation and reception ==
Interpretations of “The Gift Outright” have changed drastically throughout the 20th and 21st centuries. The poem was recited at John F. Kennedy's inauguration, and was met with cheering and applause. Some critics would later form a very different view than that of the onlooking crowds.

=== Positive reception ===
Several readers of Robert Frost’s work applaud him for his patriotism. Philip Booth, an American poet, highlights the patriotic nature of Frost’s work. Booth states “we became a free nation not in surrender to a parent-state, but by giving ourselves outright to the revolutionary impulse,” making reference to America gaining independence from Britain.

=== Criticism ===
Described as a “history of the United States” by Robert Frost himself, the poem states that Americans and their kinship are of belonging to the American lands, insinuating that native peoples did not already inhabit substantial amounts of land. Siobhan Philips directly criticizes this aspect of the poem, mentioning “the poem’s racist assumption of a white, European, landowning “we” and its racist ignorance of how the same Europeans worked to eradicate Native American culture and perpetuate slavery.” Lionel Trilling’s criticism of the poet was perceived to be an attack not only on the values of the poet but on the American myth overall.

=== Interpretation ===
Within the first lines of the poem, multiple critics have connected the poem to the Frontier myth. Frost is “provoking readers’ thought” by using words to create the idea that before North America was populated by Europeans, the land was uninhabited and uncivilized. Hamida Bosmajian believes that the entirety of the poem “can be seen as a joke at the expense of negligible folk”, implying that uneducated people are unable to understand what the poet is saying. Furthermore, she interprets the poem as a way to describe how America tries to reconcile its past, while on the other hand not fully understanding itself at the present. She also identifies that the further on the reader delves into the poem, the more ambiguous the lines seem. When Frost uses the word "unenhanced", this hints at the idea that the final lines should deliver the idea that while America in the past was unrefined, the future may also bring forth an indefinite present. Furthermore, Frost weaves in criticisms within the second half of the poem. For example, the line "(The deed of many gifts was many deeds of war)" contradicts the word "surrender" in the line above. It is up to the reader to whether or not the include the parenthetical line, but whether they do so will also determine the meaning of the poem. This contributes to its ambiguity. When these details are overlooked, the reader may become wrapped up in the aura of the poem, which relays a nationalistic vibe.

== Inaugural recitation ==
“The Gift Outright” was not originally intended to be read by itself at Kennedy’s inauguration. The poem titled “For John F. Kennedy’s Inauguration” was a poem meant to lead up to “The Gift Outright” to encourage nationalism within the crowd during the new beginnings of the Kennedy Administration. During the ceremony, Frost was unable to read his own work because of the sun’s reflection on the paper making the words illegible, so he recited “The Gift Outright” which he had written and published years earlier by memory. Kennedy later stated that Frost’s work was “the deepest source of our national strength”. “The Gift Outright”, an evidently patriotic piece, had the last line of the original poem, “such as she will become”, altered by the request of Kennedy in order to demonstrate how the Kennedy administration will uplift America and make it better. During his reading Frost says “Such as she would become, has become, and I– and for this occasion let me change that to– what she will become”. “The Gift Outright” tells a story about how Europeans came to what would become The Americas, an “unstoried, artless, [and] unenhanced” land, and supposedly turned it into something more enhanced and full of history. Frost emphasizes what Kennedy will do to the United States by including all three variations of the last line of the poem, and saying that whatever America became in the past, Kennedy will continue to make improvements.

== See also ==
- List of United States presidential inaugural poems
- Poems at United States presidential inaugurations
