= General-Purpose Serial Interface =

7 wire communications interface, used as an interface between Ethernet MAC and PHY blocks

General-Purpose Serial Interface, also known as GPSI, 7-wire interface, or 7WS, is a 7 wire communications interface. It is used as an interface between Ethernet MAC and PHY blocks.

Data is received and transmitted using separate data paths (TXD, RXD) and separate data clocks (TXCLK, RXCLK). Other signals consist of transmit enable (TXEN), receive carrier sense (CRS), and collision (COL).

GPSI signals
Signal name	Direction	Description
TXD	MAC > PHY	Transmit Data (driven on rising edge of TXCLK)
TXEN	MAC > PHY	Transmit Data Enable (indicates valid TXD)
... etc. ...	...	...

== See also ==
- Media-independent interface (MII)
