= Capital Hilton =

Hotel in Washington D.C., United States

Coordinates: 38.903°N 77.036°W

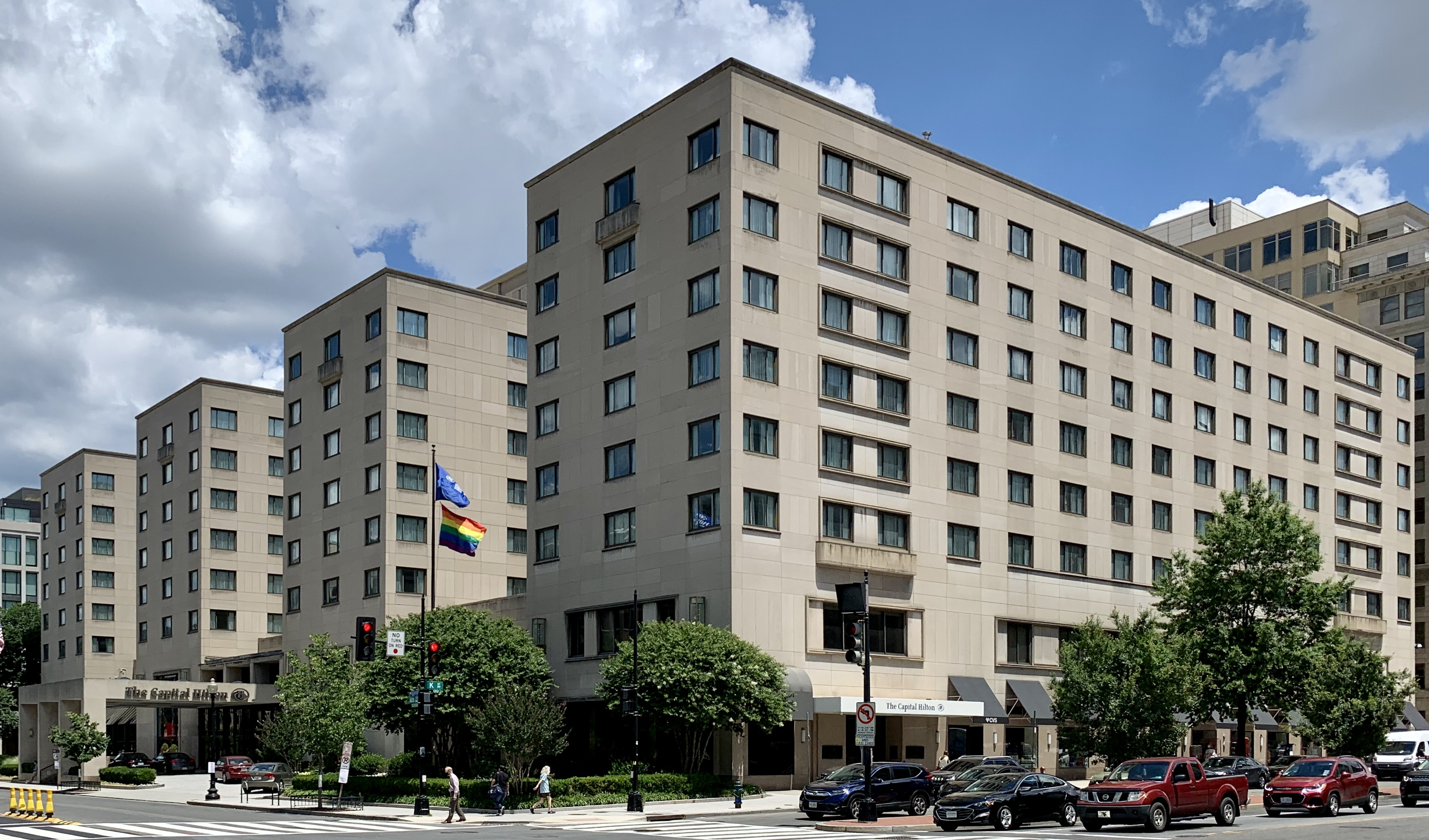
- Capital Hilton in 2020
- Interactive map of the Capital Hilton area
- Hotel chain: Hilton Hotels & Resorts

General information
- Location: United States, 1001 16th Street Northwest Washington, D.C. 20001, United States
- Opening: January 18, 1943
- Owner: Braemar Hotels & Resorts
- Operator: Hilton Hotels & Resorts

Technical details
- Floor count: 14

Design and construction
- Architects: Holabird & Root LLC, A.R. Clas Associates

Other information
- Number of rooms: 544

Website
- Capital Hilton

The Capital Hilton, originally named the Hotel Statler, is a historic hotel located just north of the White House on 16th Street in Washington, D.C. The hotel was inducted into Historic Hotels of America in 2014.

== History ==
The hotel was built by Statler Hotels and began construction in 1940. It opened on January 18, 1943, in the middle of World War II, as the Hotel Statler. Upon its completion, the building rose 150 feet (46 m), comprising 13 floors. The architect of the early modern style building was Holabird & Root LLC, A.R. Clas Associates.

In 1947, Larry Doby, the first black baseball player to integrate the American League, became the hotel's first black guest when the Cleveland Indians were in town to play against the Washington Senators.

Scenes from the classic 1950 film Born Yesterday were filmed outside the hotel and in its lobby, and much of the film is set in one of the hotel's luxury suites, which was reproduced on a soundstage.

The Statler Hotels chain was sold to Hilton Hotels in 1954 and the hotel was renamed The Statler Hilton in 1958. On January 15, 1977, the hotel was renamed The Capital Hilton. CNL Financial Group began co-owning the property with Hilton in 2003. In 2007, the Capital Hilton was among the properties sold by CNL to Ashford Hospitality Trust. In 2013, Ashford Hospitality Trust spun off the Capital Hilton and seven other hotels as a separate company, Ashford Hospitality Prime. In 2018, the parent company was renamed from Ashford Hospitality Prime to Braemar Hotels & Resorts.

The National Trust for Historic Preservation accepted the Capital Hilton to be part of the Historic Hotels of America in 2014.

== See also ==
- List of tallest buildings in Washington, D.C.
- Sixteenth Street Historic District
