= List of hospitals in Illinois =

This is a list of hospitals in Illinois, sorted by name:

== A ==
- Advocate Children's Hospital, Park Ridge and Oak Lawn campuses
- Advocate Christ Medical Center, Oak Lawn
- Advocate Condell Medical Center, Libertyville
- Advocate Good Samaritan Hospital, Downers Grove
- Advocate Good Shepherd Hospital, Barrington
- Advocate Illinois Masonic Medical Center, Chicago
- Advocate Lutheran General Hospital, Park Ridge
- Advocate Sherman Hospital, Elgin
- Advocate South Suburban Hospital, Hazel Crest
- Advocate Trinity Hospital, Chicago
- Alexian Brothers Behavioral Health Hospital, Hoffman Estates
- Alexian Brothers Medical Center, Elk Grove Village
- Anderson Hospital, Maryville
- Prime Healthcare Holy Family Medical Center, Des Plaines
- Prime Healthcare Mercy Medical Center, Aurora
- Ascension Health Rehabilitation Hospital in partnership with Shirley Ryan AbilityLab, Elk Grove Village
- Prime Healthcare Resurrection Medical Center, Chicago
- Ascension Health St. Alexius Medical Center, Hoffman Estates
- Prime Healthcare Saint Francis Hospital, Evanston
- Ascension Health Saint Joseph Hospital - Chicago, Chicago
- Prime Healthcare Saint Joseph Hospital - Elgin, Elgin
- Ascension Health Saint Joseph Medical Center, Joliet
- Ascension Health Saints Mary and Elizabeth Medical Center Chicago–Saint Elizabeth Campus, Chicago
- Ascension Health Saints Mary and Elizabeth Medical Center Chicago–Saint Mary Campus, Chicago
- Ascension Health Women & Children's Hospital, Hoffman Estates
- Community Memorial Hospital, Staunton

== B ==
- BJC HealthCare
  - Alton Memorial Hospital, Alton
  - Memorial Hospital Belleville, Belleville
  - Memorial Hospital Shiloh, Shiloh
- Blessing Health System
  - Blessing Hospital, Quincy
  - Illini Community Hospital, Pittsfield
- Thomas H. Boyd Memorial Hospital, Carrollton

== C ==
- Carle Health
  - Carle BroMenn Medical Center, Normal
  - Carle Eureka Hospital, Eureka
  - Carle Foundation Hospital, Urbana
  - Carle Methodist Medical Center of Illinois, Peoria
  - Carle Pekin Memorial Hospital, Pekin
  - Carle Proctor Hospital, Peoria
  - Carle Richland Memorial Hospital, Olney
- Carlinville Area Hospital, Carlinville
- Cook County Health
  - Provident Hospital of Cook County, Chicago
  - John H. Stroger, Jr. Hospital of Cook County, Chicago
- CGH Medical Center, Sterling
- Chicago Behavioral Hospital, Des Plaines
- City of Hope, Chicago
- Clay County Hospital, Flora
- Community First Medical Center, Chicago
- Crawford Memorial Hospital, Robinson
- Sarah D. Culbertson Memorial Hospital, Rushville

== E ==
- Endeavor Health
  - Edward Hospital, Naperville
  - Elmhurst Memorial Hospital, Elmhurst
  - Evanston Hospital, Evanston
  - Glenbrook Hospital, Glenview
  - Highland Park Hospital, Highland Park
  - Linden Oaks Hospital, Naperville
  - Northwest Community Hospital, Arlington Heights
  - Plainfield Emergency Center, Plainfield
  - Skokie Hospital, Skokie
  - Endeavor Swedish Hospital, Chicago

== F ==
- Fairfield Memorial Hospital, Fairfield
- Fayette County Hospital, Vandalia
- Ferrell Hospital, Eldorado
- FHN Memorial Hospital, Freeport
- Franciscan Health Olympia Fields, Olympia Fields
- Franklin Hospital, Benton

== G ==
- Garfield Park Behavioral Hospital, Chicago
- Genesis Medical Center - Aledo, Aledo
- Genesis Medical Center - Silvis, Silvis
- Gibson Area Hospital, Gibson City

== H ==
- Hamilton Memorial Hospital, Mc Leansboro
- Hammond-Henry Hospital, Geneseo
- Hardin County General Hospital, Rosiclare
- Harrisburg Medical Center, Harrisburg
- Hartgrove Hospital, Chicago
- Hillsboro Area Hospital, Hillsboro
- Holy Family Hospital, Greenville
- Holy Cross Hospital, Chicago
- Hoopeston Community Memorial Hospital, Hoopeston
- Hopedale Hospital, Hopedale
- Hospital Sisters Health System
- Good Shepherd Hospital, Shelbyville
- Humboldt Park Health, formerly Norwegian American Hospital, Chicago

== I ==
- Alton Mental Health Center, Alton
- Chester Mental Health Center, Chester
- Chicago-Read Mental Health Center, Chicago
- Choate Mental Health and Developmental Center, Anna
- Elgin Mental Health Center, Elgin
- Kankakee State Hospital, Kankakee
- Mabley Developmental Center, Dixon
- Madden Mental Health Center, Hines
- McFarland Mental Health Center, Springfield
- Insight Hospital and Medical Center, Chicago
- Iroquois Memorial Hospital, Watseka

== J ==
- Jackson Park Hospital & Medical Center, Chicago
- Jersey Community Hospital, Jerseyville

== K ==
- Katherine Shaw Bethea Hospital, Dixon
- Kindred Chicago Central Hospital, Chicago
- Kindred Hospital - Chicago, Chicago
- Kindred Hospital - Northlake, Northlake
- Kindred Hospital - Sycamore, Sycamore
- Kirby Medical Center, Monticello

== L ==
- La Rabida Children's Hospital, Chicago
- Lawrence County Memorial Hospital, Lawrenceville
- Lincoln Prairie Behavioral Health Center, Springfield
- Loretto Hospital, Chicago
- Captain James A. Lovell Federal Health Care Center, North Chicago
- Loyola Medicine:
  - Gottlieb Memorial Hospital, Melrose Park
  - Loyola University Medical Center, Maywood
  - MacNeal Hospital, Berwyn
- Ann & Robert H. Lurie Children's Hospital of Chicago, Chicago

== M ==
- Marshall Browning Hospital, Du Quoin
- Mason District Hospital, Havana
- Massac Memorial Hospital, Metropolis
- McDonough District Hospital, Macomb
- Memorial Health
  - Decatur Memorial Hospital, Decatur
  - Lincoln Memorial Hospital, Lincoln
  - Springfield Memorial Hospital, Springfield
  - Jacksonville Memorial Hospital, Jacksonville
  - Taylorville Memorial Hospital, Taylorville
- Memorial Hospital of Carthage, Carthage
- Memorial Hospital of Chester, Illinois, Chester
- Mercyhealth:
  - Javon Bea Hospital - Riverside, Rockford
  - Javon Bea Hospital - Rockton, Rockford
  - Mercyhealth Hospital and Medical Center - Harvard, Harvard
- Midwest Medical Center, Galena
- Montrose Behavioral Health Hospital, Chicago
- Morris Hospital and Health Care Centers, Morris
- Morrison Community Hospital, Morrison
- Mount Sinai Medical Center, Chicago

== N ==
- Northwestern Medicine:
  - Central DuPage Hospital, Winfield
  - Delnor Hospital, Geneva
  - Huntley Hospital, Huntley
  - Kishwaukee Hospital, DeKalb
  - Lake Forest Hospital, Lake Forest
  - Marianjoy Rehabilitation Hospital, Wheaton
  - McHenry Hospital, McHenry
  - Northwestern Memorial Hospital, Chicago
  - Northwestern Medicine Palos Hospital, Palos Heights
  - Valley West Hospital, Sandwich
  - Woodstock Hospital, Woodstock

== O ==
- Children's Hospital of Illinois, Peoria
- OSF Heart of Mary Medical Center, Urbana
- OSF Holy Family Medical Center, Monmouth
- OSF Little Company of Mary Medical Center, Evergreen Park
- OSF Sacred Heart Medical Center, Danville
- OSF Saint Anthony Medical Center, Rockford
- OSF Saint Anthony's Health Center, Alton
- OSF Saint Clare Medical Center, Princeton
- OSF Saint Elizabeth Medical Center, Ottawa
- OSF Saint Francis Medical Center, Peoria
- OSF Saint James - John W. Albrecht Medical Center, Pontiac
- OSF St. Joseph Medical Center, Bloomington
- OSF Saint Luke Medical Center, Kewanee
- OSF St. Mary Medical Center, Galesburg
- OSF Saint Paul Medical Center, Mendota
- OSF HealthCare Transitional Hospital, Peoria

== P ==
- Pana Community Hospital, Pana
- Paris Community Hospital, Paris
- The Pavilion Behavioral Health System, Champaign
- Pinckneyville Community Hospital, Pinckneyville

== Q ==
- Crossroads Community Hospital, Mt. Vernon
- Galesburg Cottage Hospital, Galesburg
- Gateway Regional Medical Center, Granite City
- Heartland Regional Medical Center, Marion
- Red Bud Regional Hospital, Red Bud
- Union County Hospital, Anna

== R ==
- Resilience Healthcare
  - Louis A. Weiss Memorial Hospital, Chicago
  - West Suburban Medical Center, Oak Park
- Riveredge Hospital, Forest Park
- Riverside Medical Center, Kankakee
- RML Specialty Hospital - Chicago, Chicago
- RML Specialty Hospital - Hinsdale, Hinsdale
- Rochelle Community Hospital, Rochelle
- Roseland Community Hospital, Chicago
- RUSH Health
  - RUSH Copley Medical Center, Aurora
  - RUSH Oak Park Hospital, Oak Park
  - RUSH University Medical Center, Chicago
- Shirley Ryan AbilityLab, Chicago

== S ==
- Saint Anthony Hospital, Chicago
- Saint Bernard Hospital, Chicago
- Saint Anthony's Memorial Hospital, Effingham
- Saint Elizabeth's Hospital, O'Fallon
- Saint Francis Hospital, Litchfield
- Saint John's Hospital, Springfield
- Saint Joseph's Hospital - Breese, Breese
- Saint Joseph's Hospital - Highland, Highland
- Saint Mary's Hospital, Centralia
- Saint Mary's Hospital, Decatur
- Saint Mary's Hospital, Kankakee
- Salem Township Hospital, Salem
- Sarah Bush Lincoln Health Center, Mattoon
- Shriners Hospital for Children - Chicago, Chicago
- Silver Cross Hospital, New Lenox
- Schwab Rehabilitation Center, Chicago
- South Shore Hospital, Chicago
- Southern Illinois Healthcare
- SIH Herrin Hospital, Herrin
- SIH Memorial Hospital of Carbondale, Carbondale
- SIH Saint Joseph Memorial Hospital, Murphysboro
- Sparta Community Hospital, Sparta
- SSM Health Care
- Clay County Hospital, Flora
- Good Samaritan Hospital - Mt. Vernon, Mt. Vernon
- Streamwood Hospital, Streamwood

== T ==
- Thorek Memorial Hospital, Chicago
- Thorek Memorial Hospital Andersonville, Chicago
- Touchette Regional Hospital, Centreville

== U ==
- UnityPoint Health - Trinity
  - UnityPoint Health - Trinity Moline, Moline
  - UnityPoint Health - Trinity Rock Island, Rock Island
- University of Chicago Medicine
  - The Center for Care and Discovery, Chicago
  - Bernard A. Mitchell Hospital, Chicago
  - Comer Children's Hospital, Chicago
  - UChicago Medicine AdventHealth (joint venture in which University of Chicago Medicine has a controlling interest)
    - UChicago Medicine AdventHealth Bolingbrook, Bolingbrook
    - UChicago Medicine AdventHealth GlenOaks, Glendale Heights
    - UChicago Medicine AdventHealth Hinsdale, Hinsdale
    - UChicago Medicine AdventHealth La Grange, La Grange
  - UChicago Medicine Ingalls Memorial Hospital, Harvey
- UI Health
  - Children's Hospital University of Illinois (CHUI), Chicago
  - Illinois Eye and Ear Infirmary, Chicago
  - University of Illinois Hospital, Chicago
- UW Health
  - Belvidere Hospital, Belvidere
  - Heart Hospital, Rockford
  - SwedishAmerican Hospital, Rockford
  - Women and Children's Hospital, Rockford

== V ==
- Van Matre Encompass Health Rehabilitation Hospital, Rockford
- Veterans Health Administration
  - Jesse Brown VA Medical Center, Chicago
  - Edward Hines Jr. Veterans Administration Hospital, Hines
  - Marion Veterans Affairs Medical Center, Marion
- Vista Health System
  - Vista Freestanding Emergency Center, Lindenhurst
  - Vista Medical Center East, Waukegan

== W ==
- Wabash General Hospital District, Mt. Carmel
- Warner Hospital, Clinton
- Washington County Hospital, Nashville

== Defunct and/or renamed ==
- American Hospital, Chicago
- Augustana Hospital, Chicago
- Burnham City Hospital, Champaign
- Cancer Treatment Centers of America, Chicago
- Central Community Hospital, Chicago
- Chicago Center Hospital, Chicago
- Chicago Municipal Tuberculosis Sanitarium, Chicago
- Chicago Union Hospital, Chicago
- Children's Memorial Hospital, Chicago
- Columbus Hospital, Chicago
- Doctor's Hospital, Springfield
- Doctor's Hospital of Hyde Park, Chicago
- Douglas Park Hospital, Chicago
- Edgewater Medical Center, Chicago
- Englewood Hospital, Chicago
- Fairbury Hospital, Fairbury
- Forest Hospital, Des Plaines
- Frank Cuneo Memorial Hospital, Chicago
- Garfield Park Hospital, Chicago
- Grant Hospital, Chicago
- Hahnemann Hospital, Chicago
- Henrotin Memorial Hospital, Chicago
- HD Singer Hospital, Rockford
- Jacksonville Developmental Center, Jacksonville
- Jefferson Park Hospital, Chicago
- John B. Murphy Hospital, Chicago
- Lakeside Community Hospital, Chicago
- Lewis Memorial Maternity Hospital, Chicago
- Lincoln Park Hospital, Chicago
- Lutheran Deaconess Hospital, Chicago
- Manteno State Hospital, Manteno
- Marine Hospital, Chicago
- Martha Washington Hospital, Chicago
- Mary Thompson Hospital for Women and Children, Chicago
- Mercy Hospital, Urbana
- Michael Reese Hospital, Chicago
- MetroSouth Medical Center, Blue Island
- Mound City Civil War Naval Hospital, Mound City
- Neurologic & Orthopedic Hospital of Chicago, Chicago
- North Chicago Hospital, Chicago
- Oak Forest Hospital of Cook County, Oak Forest
- Passavant Hospital, Chicago
- Peoria State Hospital, Bartonville
- Prentice Women's Hospital Building, Chicago
- Presbyterian Hospital, Chicago
- Ravenswood Hospital, Chicago
- Royal Arch Memorial Hospital, Sullivan
- Salvation Army Booth Hospital, Chicago
- South Chicago Hospital, Chicago
- St. Anne's Hospital, Chicago
- St. Cabrini Hospital, Chicago
- St. George Hospital, Chicago
- St. Luke's Hospital, Chicago
- Saint Margaret's Health - Peru, Peru
- Saint Margaret's Health - Spring Valley, Spring Valley
- St. Mary's Hospital, Quincy
- St. Mary’s Hospital, Streator
- Streeter Hospital, Chicago
- Tabernacle Community Hospital and Health Center, Chicago
- Vibra Hospital of Springfield
- Vista Medical Center West, Waukegan
- Walther Memorial/University Hospital, Chicago
- Washington Park Hospital, Chicago
- Wesley Memorial Hospital, Chicago
- West Side Hospital, Chicago
- Woodlawn Hospital, Chicago
