= Northwestern Medicine McHenry Hospital =

Northwestern Medical Hospital - McHenry
- Northwestern Medicine

Geography
- Location: McHenry, Illinois, United States
- Coordinates: 42.3433548°N 88.2661980°W

Organization
- Care system: Private
- Type: Community

Services
- Emergency department: Level II Trauma Center
- Beds: Over 200

History
- Opened: 1956

Links
- Website: Official website
- Lists: Hospitals in Illinois

Northwestern Medicine McHenry Hospital is a hospital in McHenry, Illinois. Previously, the hospital was called Northern Illinois Medical Center and later Centegra Hospital - McHenry. The hospital is a division of Northwestern Medicine since 2018 when Northwestern Medicine partnered with Centegra Health System.

== History ==
In 1956, Dr. Lee Gladstone built a clinic on Green Street in the city of McHenry. The first and second floor included an emergency room, operating room, reception areas and offices for outpatient physician care. The ground floor provided 22 beds for new born, pediatric and adult patients. A McHenry Hospital addition was soon built near the clinic on Waukegan Avenue. With the rapid growth of population, a new McHenry Hospital was built in 1984 on Illinois Route 31 and Bull Valley Road and was named Northern Illinois Medical Center.
