= OSF HealthCare Sacred Heart Medical Center – Urbana =

Sacred Heart Medical Center – Urbana
- OSF HealthCare

Geography
- Location: Urbana, Illinois, United States
- Coordinates: 40.11792°N 88.22746°W

Organization
- Care system: Not-for-profit
- Type: General

Services
- Emergency department: Level II trauma center
- Beds: 210

History
- Founded: 1894

Links
- Website: https://www.osfhealthcare.org/hospitals/sacred-heart-urbana
- Lists: Hospitals in Illinois

Sacred Heart Medical Center – Urbana is owned by OSF HealthCare, formerly OSF Heart of Mary Medical Center and Provena Covenant Medical Center is a 210-bed non-profit hospital in Urbana, Illinois, USA. It is part of the OSF HealthCare System, headquartered in Peoria. The facility is accredited by the Joint Commission and the Commission on Accreditation of Rehabilitation Facilities (CARF).

== History ==
The hospital was formed by the merging of two hospitals, Burnham City Hospital and Mercy Hospital, in 1989. Burnham City Hospital was founded in 1894 and Mercy Hospital was founded by the Servants of the Holy Heart of Mary in 1919. In 1997, the medical center became part of the Provena Health system and was renamed Provena Covenant Medical Center. In 2026, the hospital expanded behavioral health services and facility was renamed OSF Sacred Heart Medical Center – Urbana.

== Services ==
Key services include regional emergency medical services, in-patient psychiatry, home health, home care and hospice services, with outpatient cardiovascular, obstetrics and gynecology and pediatric clinics.

== Awards ==
As Heart of Mary Medical Center, the facility was recognized by HealthGrades for total knee replacement and joint replacement surgery.

== Tax-exempt case ==
In 2002, the Champaign County Board of Review challenged Provena Covenant's tax-exempt status based on debt-collection tactics and the amount of charity care offered. Ultimately, the Illinois Department of Revenue denied Provena Covenant's status, which led to the matter being considered by the circuit court of Sangamon County, Illinois, which sided with Provena Covenant. The matter was then considered by the Appellate Court and, later, the Illinois Supreme Court which both rendered decisions against Provena Covenant's tax-exempt status. In a March 18, 2010, judgment by the Illinois Supreme Court (Provena Covenant Medical Center vs. the (Illinois) Department of Revenue), the Court agreed that the Department of Revenue had acted properly in denying charitable and religious property tax exemptions requested by Provena Hospitals. In the judgment, the Court noted that "a mere 302 of its (Provena Covenant's) 110,000 admissions received reductions in their bills based on charitable considerations." The court added, "uninsured patients were charged PCMC’s “established” rates, which were more than double the actual costs of care. When patients were granted discounts at the 25 and 50 percent levels, the hospital was therefore still able to generate a surplus." In response, Jon Sokolski, Chair of the Board of Provena Covenant Medical Center, said, "We are deeply disappointed that the Illinois Supreme Court has denied the property tax exemption of Provena Covenant Medical Center. Provena…cares for all in our community who need our health services regardless of their ability to pay. In 2008, we provided more than $38 million in free care and other community benefits."
