= OSF St. Joseph Medical Center =

- OSF Healthcare System
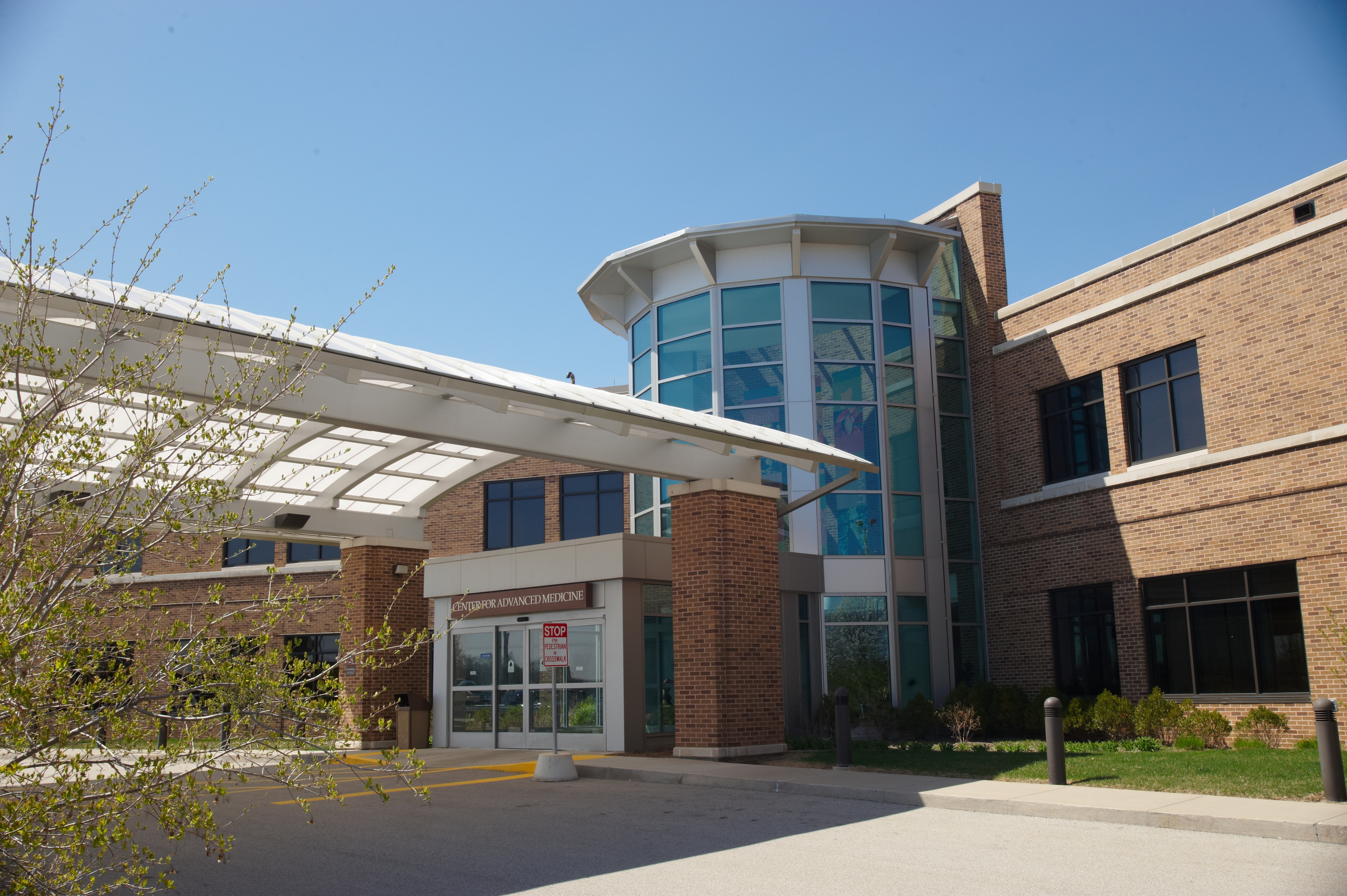
- Center for Advanced Medicine at OSF St. Joseph

- Location within Illinois

Geography
- Location: 2200 E. Washington St., Bloomington, Illinois, United States
- Coordinates: 40.4828°N 88.9561°W

Organization
- Type: General

Services
- Standards: Joint Commission (#7248)
- Emergency department: Level II trauma center
- Beds: 149

History
- Founded: March 22, 1880

Links
- Website: http://www.osfstjoseph.org/
- Lists: Hospitals in Illinois

OSF St. Joseph Medical Center is a 149-bed Level II trauma center hospital complex in Bloomington, Illinois, USA, and is part of the OSF Healthcare System.

St. Joseph Hospital accepted its first patient on 1880. The original hospital was a two-story brick mansion on Jackson Street. The current site on East Washington Street was opened in the 1960s.

Among the hospital's claims of firsts in central Illinois were the first successful Caesarian section birth; the 1929 first blood transfusion; first successful radiation therapy in the 1940s; the 1990 first open heart surgery; and first "beating heart surgery", in which the heart is not stopped, in 2000.
