= Northwestern Medicine Woodstock Hospital =

Coordinates: 42°18′45″N 88°27′22″W

- Northwestern Medicine

Geography
- Location: Woodstock, McHenry County, Illinois, United States

Organization
- Care system: Private
- Type: Community

Services
- Emergency department: Level II Trauma Center
- Beds: 135

History
- Opened: 1914

Links
- Website: Centegra Hospital - Woodstock
- Lists: Hospitals in Illinois

Northwestern Medicine Woodstock Hospital (formerly Centegra Hospital - Woodstock) is a hospital in Woodstock, Illinois. The hospital is a division of Northwestern Medicine since 2018 when Northwestern Medicine partnered with Centegra Health System.

== History ==
In 1914, a group of physicians obtained a charter for a hospital in the home and office of Hyde West. The success of this hospital was such that a second hospital was built on South Street in the city. This hospital was named Woodstock Memorial Hospital. The hospital was named Centegra Hospital - Woodstock until 2018 when it was renamed Northwestern Medicine Woodstock Hospital after Northwestern Medicine's takeover.
