= Children's Hospital of Illinois =

Hospital in Peoria, Illinois, US

OSF HealthCare Children’s Hospital of Illinois
- OSF Healthcare

Geography
- Location: 530 NE Glen Oak Avenue, Peoria, Illinois, United States
- Coordinates: 40.703374°N 89.590703°W

Organization
- Type: Children's Hospital
- Religious affiliation: Catholic
- Affiliated university: University of Illinois College of Medicine

Services
- Emergency department: Level 1 Pediatric Trauma Center
- Beds: 144

Helipads
- Helipad: FAA LID: LL37 (Shared with OSF Saint Francis)

History
- Former name: Saint Francis Children's Hospital
- Constructed: 2007
- Founded: 2010

Links
- Website: www.osfhealthcare.org/hospitals/childrens
- Lists: Hospitals in Illinois
- Other links: List of hospitals in Illinois

OSF HealthCare Children's Hospital of Illinois known simply as Children's Hospital of Illinois is a nationally ranked pediatric acute care children's hospital located within OSF Saint Francis Medical Center in Peoria, Illinois. The hospital has 144 pediatric beds. It is affiliated with The University of Illinois College of Medicine, and is a member of OSF HealthCare.

The hospital provides comprehensive pediatric specialties and subspecialties to infants, children, teens, and young adults aged 0–21 throughout Central Illinois. Children's Hospital of Illinois also sometimes treats adults that require pediatric care. Children's Hospital of Illinois features the only pediatric Level 1 Trauma Center in the region, and 1 of 4 in the state.

== History ==
Pediatric specialization in Peoria dates back to 1934, when the new pediatrics floor at St. Francis opened with 35 beds. In 1952, construction started on the St. Francis Children's Hospital, which opened in 1954, and occupied two floors of the new three-story building. The new hospital had 114 pediatric beds.

On January 30, 1990, the new Children's Hospital of Illinois was announced and preliminary plans were being made for a new stand-alone building for Children's Hospital.

Discussions for the Milestone Project began in 2002, and construction began in 2007. As a result, the new Children's Hospital of Illinois opened in August 2010, featuring a new Level I pediatric and a Level III neonatal intensive care unit (the only one in Central Illinois) and an emergency room. The Milestone Project was the largest expansion in the hospital's history, which added 440,000 square feet and cost $280 million.

In 2011, the hospital expanded their congenital heart program, in a merger with local clinics.

The hospital has an American Academy of Pediatrics verified Level III NICU, the highest in the state.

=== Groundbreaking surgery ===
The hospital made national and international headlines in the healthcare field on April 9, 2013. Surgery was performed on Hannah Warren, a two-year-old toddler, from South Korea (born to a Canadian father and South Korean mother) who was born without a trachea (a windpipe), also known as tracheal agenesis, a rare and usually fatal birth defect. She received an artificial trachea that incorporated, "nanofiber mesh coated with Hannah's own bone marrow cells". Because the transplant did not contain cells from another person (donor), it would free Hannah from a "lifetime of immunosuppressant drugs". This was the first bioengineered transplant on a child in the U.S. and the first bioengineered trachea transplant in the world. It was the first stem cell procedure of any kind at the Catholic medical center. The major 11-hour surgical procedure was led by Dr. Paolo Macchiarini of Sweden's's Karolinska Institute, along with top surgical and medical officials from OSF. Although the trachea implant was successful, she was unable to overcome her other health issues, and her lung function continued to deteriorate. Hannah Warren died three months after surgery, due to complications pertaining to her lung function. Her family stated that "She is a pioneer in stem-cell technology and her impact will reach all corners of our beautiful Earth".

== Patient Care Units ==
CHOI features all private rooms, with sleeping accommodations for parents. Each floor containing a pediatric unit also contains a playroom and a teen room for entertainment.

- 40-bed General Pediatrics - General Inpatient Care
- 32-bed Pediatric Critical Care Unit (PCCU) - Care For Critical Pediatric Patients
- 40-bed Neonatal Intensive Care Unit (NICU) - Intensive Care For Neonates
- 32-bed Neonatal Intermediate Care Unit - Care For Newborns Not Critical

== Community support ==
Located near the Children's Hospital of Illinois is the Ronald McDonald House of Central Illinois, Peoria. It features 22 rooms to accommodate the families of children (21 years or younger) who are being treated in the hospital.

== Rankings ==
- In 2017–18, the hospital ranked #29 in pediatric urology and #49 in neonatology on the U.S. News & World Report: Best Children's Hospitals rankings.
- In 2018–19, CHOI dropped two places and placed #31 in pediatric urology on the U.S. News & World Report.
- In 2020-21 the hospital ranked nationally in Pediatric Nephrology on the U.S. News & World Report: Best Children's Hospitals, and the 4th best children's hospital in Illinois after Lurie Children's, Comer Children's, and Advocate Children's.

== See also ==
- List of children's hospitals in the United States
- Lurie Children's Hospital
- OSF Healthcare
