= La Rabida Children's Hospital =

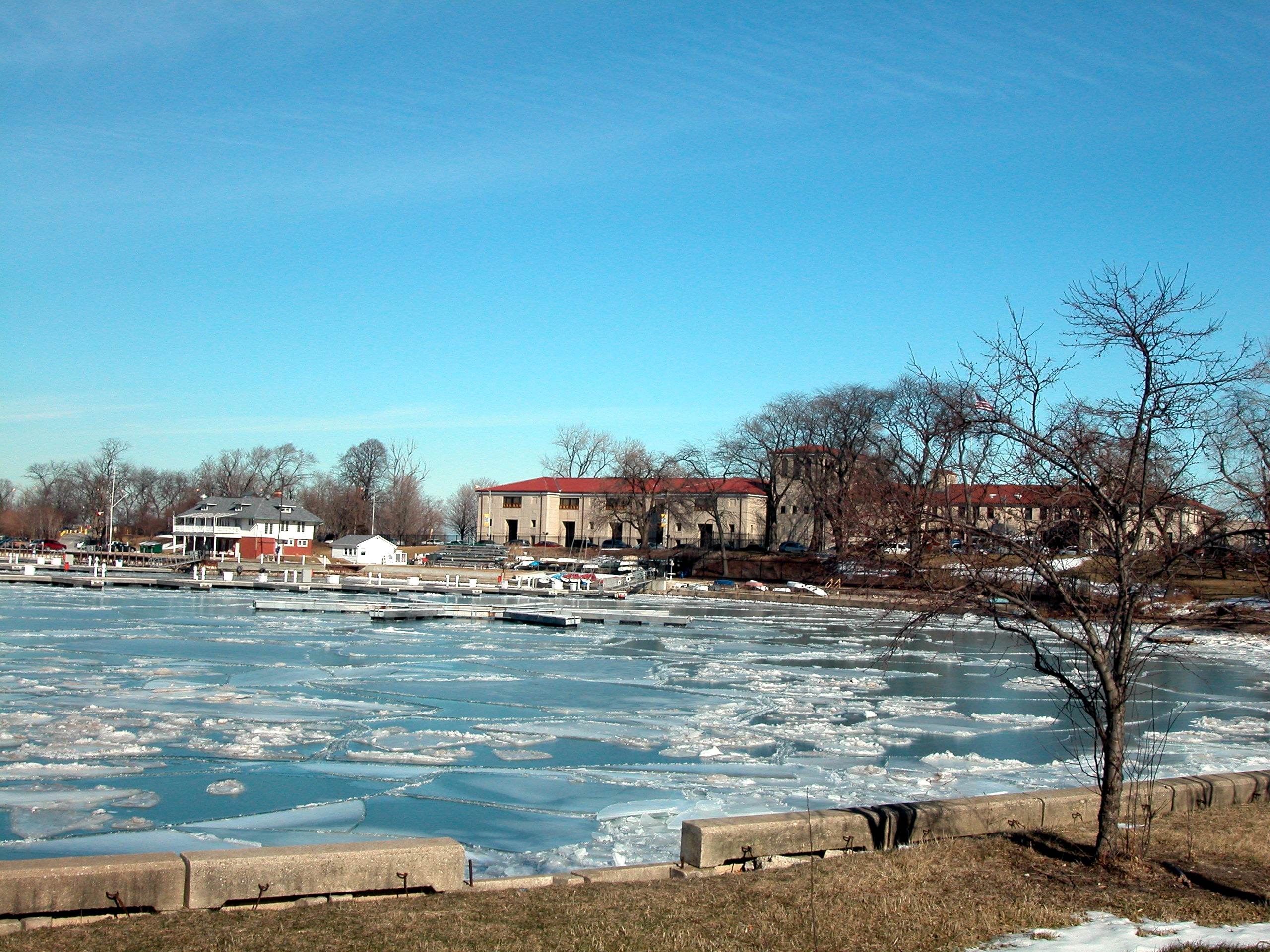
- The hospital in 2004

Geography
- Location: Woodlawn, Chicago, Illinois, United States
- Coordinates: 41°46′39″N 87°34′18″W

Organization
- Type: Specialist
- Affiliated university: The University of Chicago Comer Children's Hospital

Services
- Emergency department: Acute Care Clinic
- Beds: 39
- Speciality: Children's hospital

History
- Founded: 1896

Links
- Website: larabida.org
- Lists: Hospitals in Illinois

La Rabida Children's Hospital is a small pediatric specialty hospital for extended acute care that caters to children with lifelong medical conditions. Located on the South Side of Chicago on Lake Michigan, the facility is designed to showcase its lakeside views. La Rabida serves approximately 9,000 children annually who require primary and specialty care to address complex and challenging medical conditions. The hospital provides care to all patients regardless of the family's ability to pay. Services and programs include treatment for chronic illnesses such as asthma, diabetes, sickle cell disease, and developmental disabilities. In addition, La Rabida specializes in the treatment of children who have been abused, neglected or experienced trauma.

La Rabida is recognized by the National Committee for Quality Assurance(NCQA) for its medical home programs. The hospital has also earned the Joint Commission's Gold Seal of Approval.

== History ==
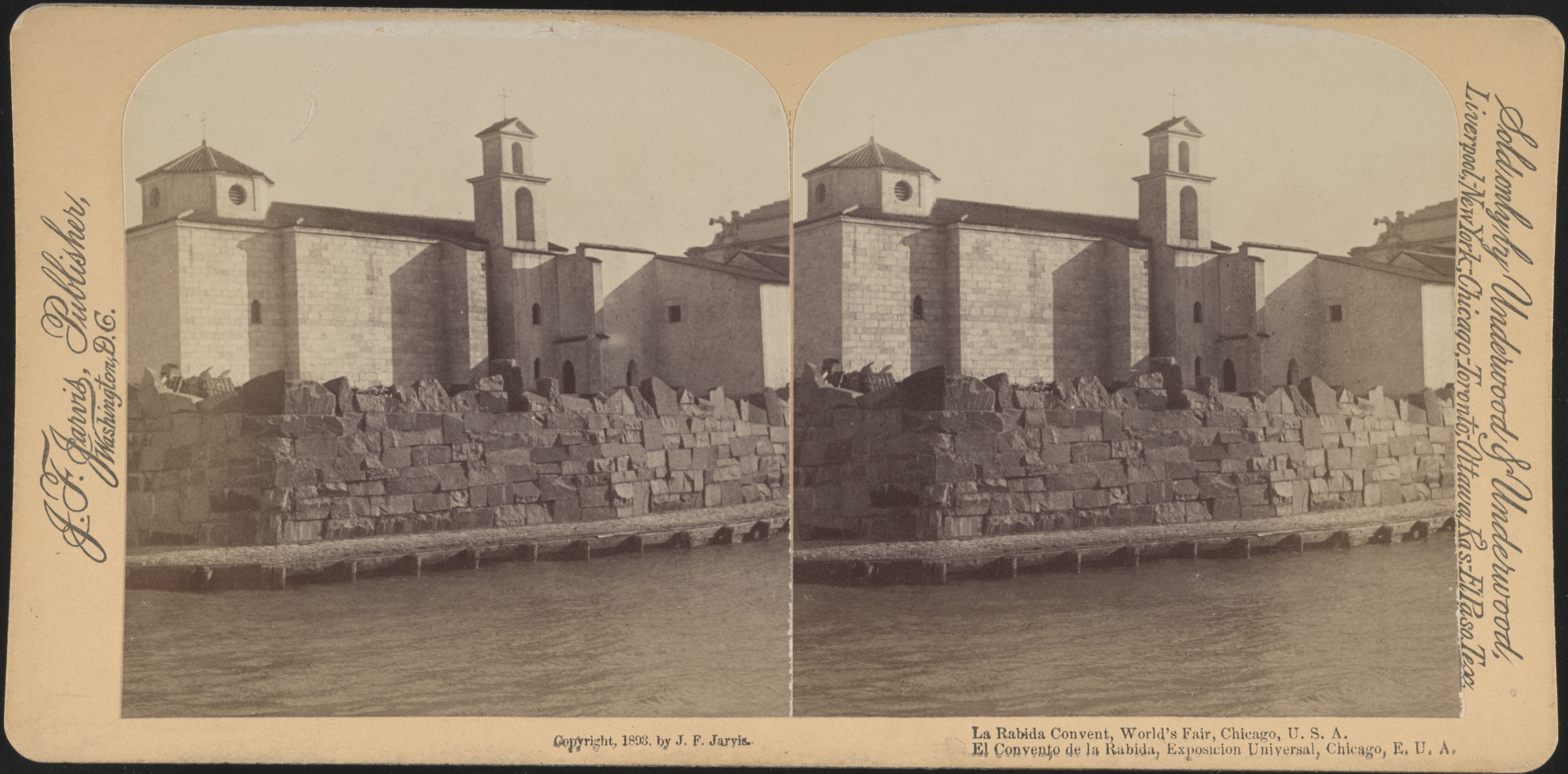
1893 stereograph of the replica La Rabida Monastery

For the Chicago World's Fair Columbian Exposition in 1893, the government of Spain constructed its exhibition hall as a replica of Spain's La Rabida Monastery – the embarkation site of Columbus’ new world exploration in 1492. After the fair, the Spanish Consulate donated the Jackson Park building to the City of Chicago for use as a fresh air sanatorium for sick children. An organizing committee, formed to convert the structure included Staud y Giminez, the Spanish Vice Consul in Chicago, who served as superintendent and treasurer; Enrique Dupuy de Lôme, Spanish Minister to the United States; Archbishop Patrick Feehan; and Forest Clark, M.D., the resident physician for the sanitarium. A woman's board formed and led the effort to equip and staff the facility, raising money for operations and recruiting volunteer physicians.

From the start, La Rabida has been open to children "regardless of race, religion or ability to pay". In the beginning, the sanatarium dealt with all of the diseases that are typical of city slums, such as typhoid, diphtheria, and scarlet fever. In the summers, women were encouraged to bring their children to the sanitarium for the day to escape the city heat.

With advances in medicine and improved living conditions, emphasis at the hospital shifted to treating children with heart conditions. In 1932, La Rabida became the first sanitarium in the midwest for children with rheumatic fever and its frequent complications, including rheumatic heart disease.

In 1944, La Rabida started a relationship with the five Chicago medical schools, allowing their doctors to act as consultants and medical students to train in the sanitarium, and in 1957, La Rabida became an affiliate of the University of Chicago's medical school. La Rabida began research and clinical studies, with the University of Chicago, to eradicate rheumatic fever.

When the incidence of rheumatic fever began to decline, La Rabida began to focus on other chronic conditions such as diabetes, sickle cell anemia, and Down syndrome, as well as disabilities and risks to children from poverty, abuse, neglect, and violence.

=== Hospital building ===
In the 1910s, the original building had become rundown and it became difficult to hire nurses due to World War I. The woman's board opened an infant welfare station at Eighty-third Street and Bond Avenue, and a day nursery in the stockyard district on South Marshfield Avenue. The woman's board decided to close the sanitarium and, instead, maintain six beds at St. Luke's Hospital. The building was destroyed by fire in 1922.

The board raised funds for a new building and, in 1929, incorporated the La Rabida Jackson Park Sanitarium. A new, 100-bed building, designed by Graham, Anderson, Probst & White, was built on the site of the old sanitarium. The building resembled the old one with Bedford stone and a Spanish tile roof. It opened in 1932 with 30 beds available; most patients were being treated for rheumatic fever.

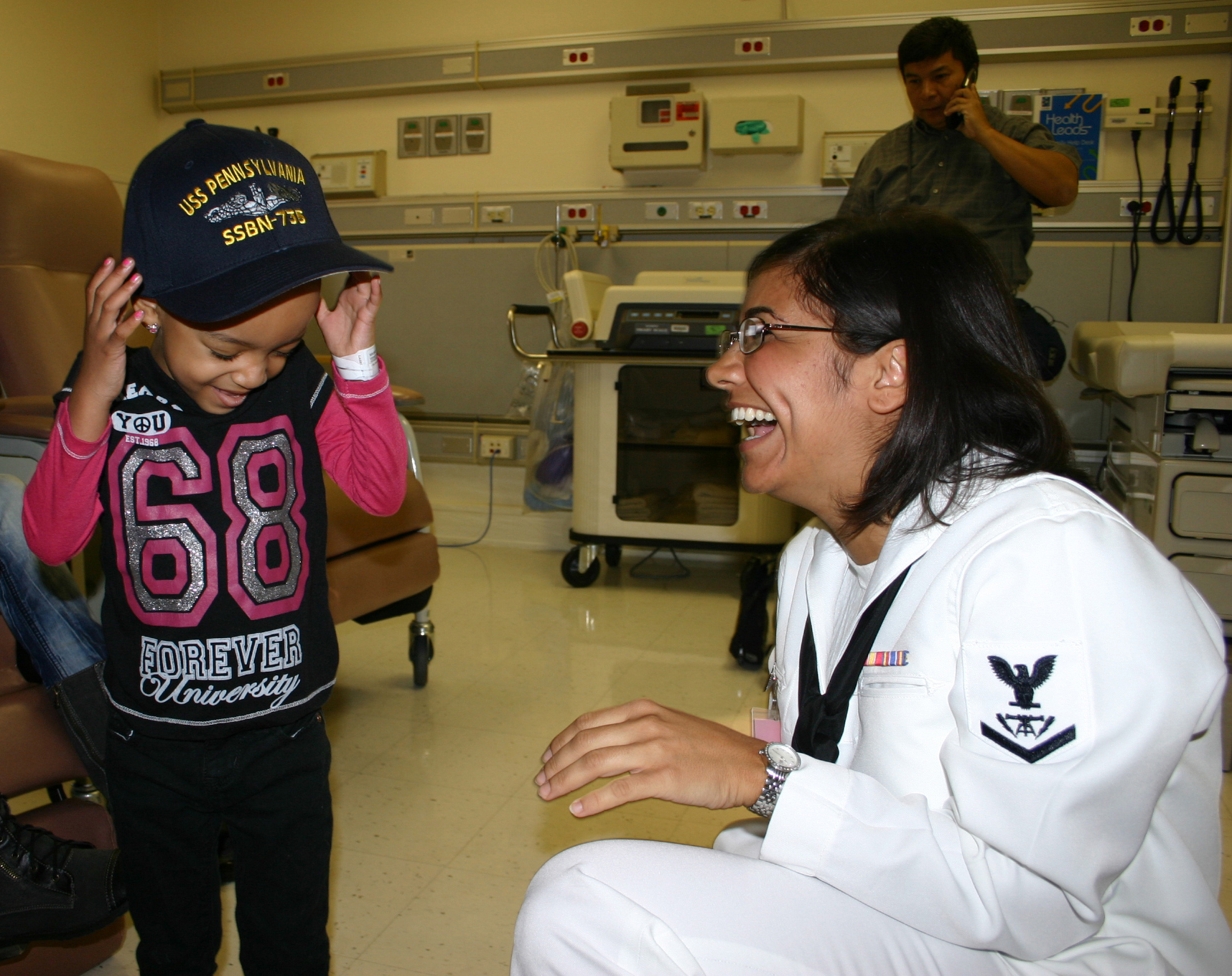
United States Navy sailors visit the hospital in 2012

An outpatient wing was added to the south of the main building in 1953, named the Gertrude Frank Pick children's center. Pick was the mother of Albert Pick Jr., a La Rabida board chairman and the president of Pick Hotels Corporation. A research wing, the Richard J. Finnegan Memorial Building, opened in 1959. Finnegan was the present of the board of La Radina from 1944 to 1955, and the editor of the Chicago Sun-Times.

The Child Life Pavilion was added in 1992 with classrooms and recreational activities, and additional inpatient rooms in 2001. In 2014, a 13,000 sq ft (1,200 m^{2}) outpatient center opened.

== Changing role in the 21st century health care market ==
La Rabida's financial status has suffered due to changes in the health care funding and stagnation of Medicaid payments (Medicaid covers a majority of its patients). It is a small hospital that does not perform surgeries or have acute care facilities. Instead it considers itself a "step-down" hospital, caring for children who are healthy enough to leave acute care but need continued medical treatment and education on dealing with chronic conditions.

Beginning in about 2015, La Rabida began to see an increase in patient numbers, especially babies younger than one year, reflecting the decrease in pediatric services at other hospitals. From 2015 to 2017, the admitted children who were younger than one year old increased from 19 to 40%. The average length of stay increased over the same time period, from 15 to 25 days.

== Medical specialties ==
- Asthma
- Behavioral and mental health - includes the Chicago Child Trauma Center in Chicago and the La Rabida Children's Advocacy Center (CAC) in Park Forest. Part of the National Child Traumatic Stress Network.
- Brain injury - includes both inpatient acute care and long-term outpatient services through the Traumatic Brain Injury (TBI) clinic.
- Bronchopulmonary dysplasia
- Burn rehabilitation
- Developmental delays - La Rabida provides an interim home for infants who are ready to leave the neonatal intensive care unit (NICU), but still need specialty care.
- Developmental disabilities - care for children with Down syndrome, cerebral palsy and other neuromuscular disorders and developmental delays.
- Diabetes - the Chicago Children's Diabetes Center (CDCC) is recognized by the American Diabetes Association and has outpatient clinics in New Lenox and Hinsdale in Illinois, and St. John, Indiana.
- Primary Care for Children with Special Needs - includes the Premier Kids program, for children with disabilities from birth to age 5, and the Failure to Thrive program, for any child with FTT.
- Rehabilitative and developmental services
- Sickle cell disease
- Spasticity
- Technology dependency - for children who have left the ICU but need continued support from medical equipment and professional oversight.
