= OSF Saint Anthony Medical Center =

Coordinates: 42°16′11″N 89°0′27″W

- OSF HealthCare

Geography
- Location: Rockford, Illinois, United States

Organization
- Care system: Private
- Type: Teaching
- Affiliated university: University of Illinois College of Medicine at Rockford, Saint Anthony College of Nursing

Services
- Emergency department: Level I trauma center
- Beds: 254

History
- Opened: August 18, 1899

Links
- Website: https://www.osfhealthcare.org/saint-anthony/
- Lists: Hospitals in Illinois

OSF Saint Anthony Medical Center is a hospital located in Rockford, Illinois, USA. The medical center is part of the OSF Healthcare System.

== History ==
On July 1, 1899, six of the Sisters of the Third Order of St. Francis moved to Rockford at the request of the citizens to open a hospital. The order had previously moved to America from Prussia in 1875, when Otto von Bismarck banned religious orders from the country. With the help of the real estate agent William Crotty, the sisters were able to purchase a house on the corner of East State St. and Summit St. Community members donated the supplies and furniture for the first hospital.

== Services ==
OSF Saint Anthony Medical Center operates a Level I trauma center. OSF Saint Anthony Medical Center has the only trauma center verified by the American College of Surgeons in Illinois outside of the Chicago metropolitan area. The emergency department has 17 rooms with a total of 24 beds. Since 1981, the Lifeline Emergency Helicopter Service has been based at Saint Anthony. The medical center also operates Rockford Cardiovascular Associates. The Illinois Neurosciences Institute is located at the medical center. OSF SAMC surgeons perform 60% of open heart surgery cases in Rockford, making OSF SAMC the community leader in open heart surgery.

== Awards ==
In 2005, the American Nurses Credentialing Center awarded OSF the center "Magnet" status, the highest national recognition of nursing excellence that a hospital can receive.
