= William Barnes (entomologist) =

American entomologist and surgeon

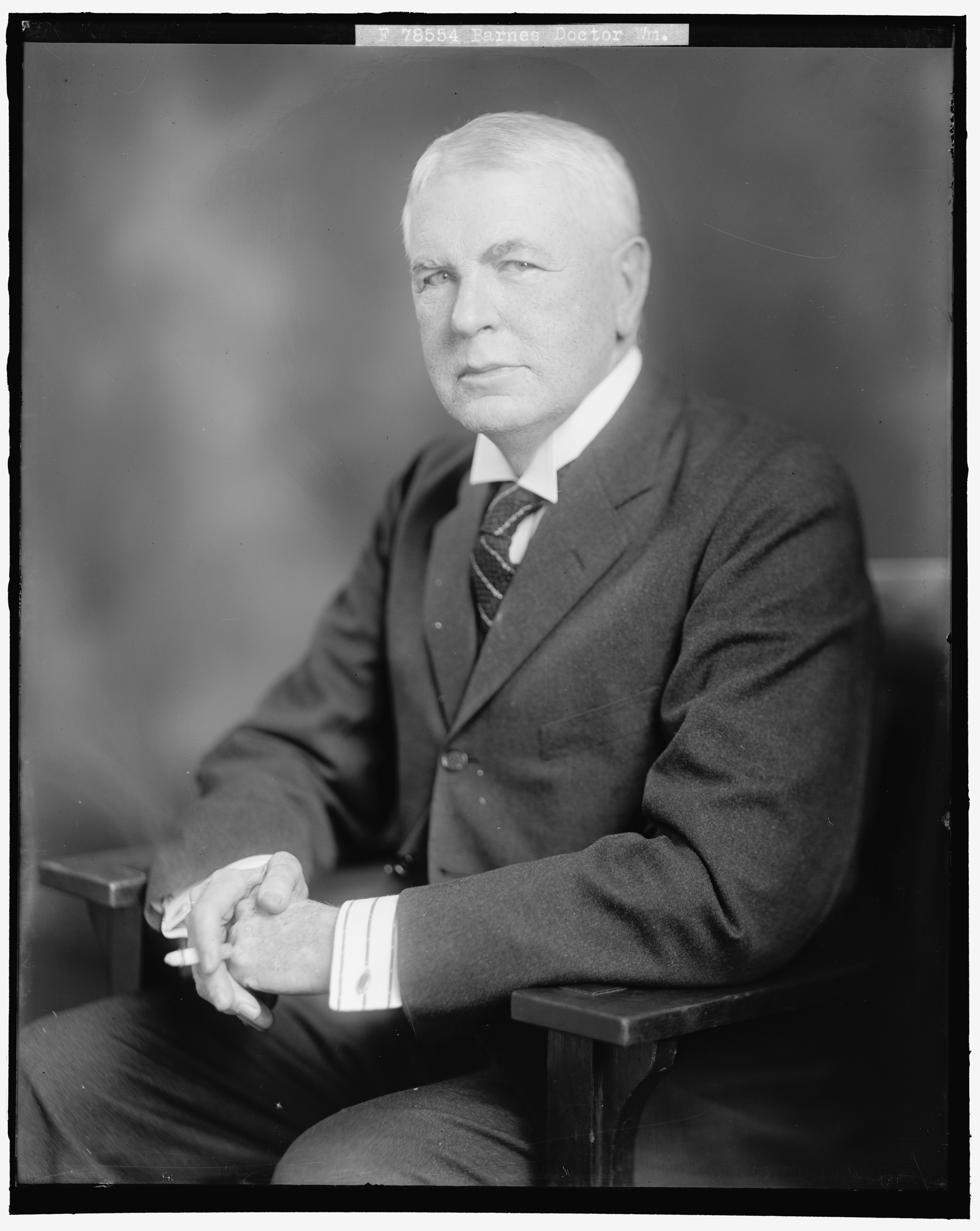
- Born: September 3, 1860; Decatur, Illinois, U.S.
- Died: May 1, 1930 (aged 69); Decatur, Illinois, U.S.
- Education: Harvard Medical School
- Scientific career
- Fields: Entomology, medicine
- Author abbrev. (zoology): Barnes

William Barnes (September 3, 1860 – May 1, 1930, Decatur, Illinois) was an American entomologist and surgeon. He was the son of William A. and Eleanor Sawyer Barnes. He graduated from the Decatur High School in 1877. Then spent a year at Illinois State University followed by a year at University of Illinois at Urbana–Champaign. In 1879, he entered Harvard Medical School and graduated in 1886. While at Harvard, he met naturalist Louis Agassiz and his love of Lepidoptera grew. Agassiz taught him how to preserve and classify the butterflies. He completed an internship at Boston City Hospital and then studied abroad in Heidelberg, Munich, and Vienna. In 1890, Dr. Barnes came home to Decatur and opened his medical practice. That same year he married Charlotte L. Gillette. The couple had two children.

He was one of the founders of Decatur Memorial Hospital. Barnes served as its president until his death. During that time he donated his time, talent and around $200,000.

From 1910 to 1919 James Halliday McDunnough produced, with Barnes credited as co-author, an impressive volume of research on the taxonomy of North American Lepidoptera, including the first four volumes of the privately published Contributions to the Natural History of the Lepidoptera of North America, the 1917 Check List of the Lepidoptera of Boreal America, Illustrations of the North American Species of the Genus Catocala, and numerous journal articles, 67 papers in all.

In 1913, Barnes became a Fellow of the Entomological Society of America.

At his death in 1930, his collection of butterflies was regarded as the largest and finest in the world with possibly 10,000 species and an estimated 473,000 specimens, even receiving praise in the 1936 National Geographic magazine. As a result of Barnes' collection, hundreds of species new to science were discovered and described. A few months after his death, the U.S. government bought Barnes' collection for $50,000; the collection was to be housed in the Smithsonian Institution. It is the largest collection by number of specimens in the history of the Smithsonian.
