= OSF Saint Francis Medical Center =

- OSF Healthcare System

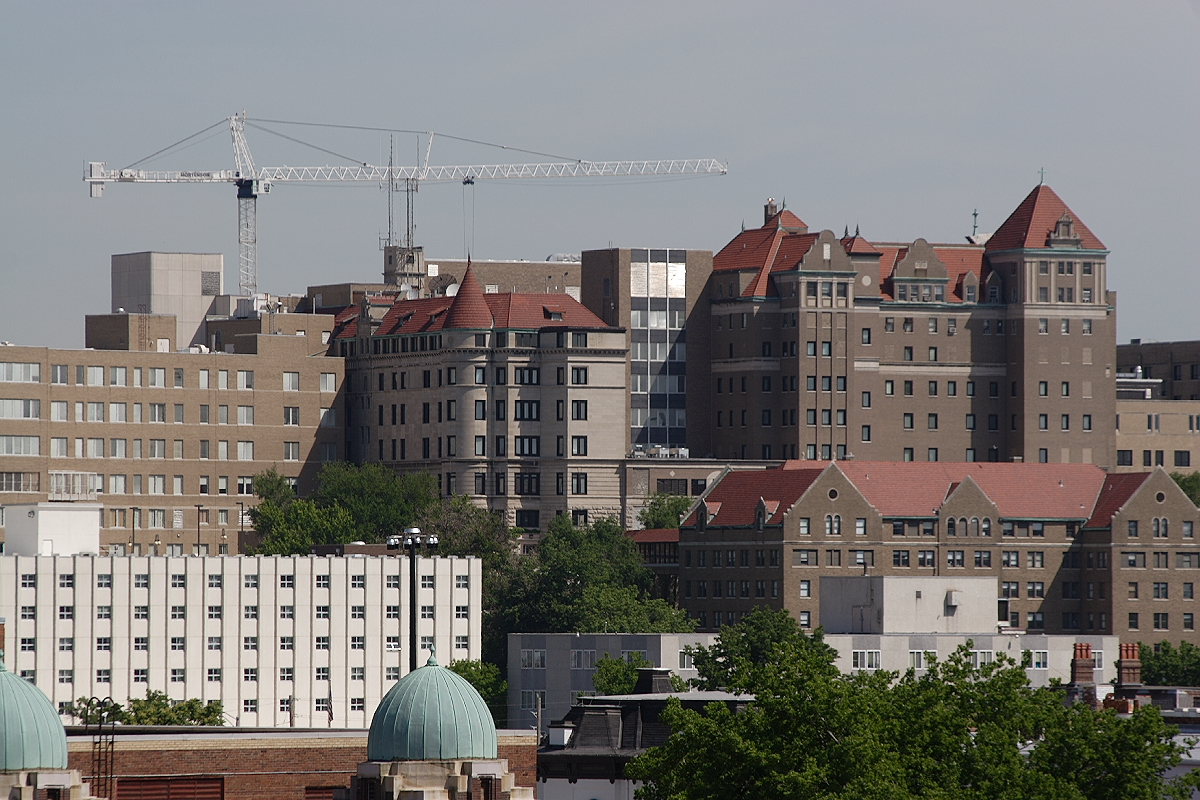
- 2006 expansion (The Milestone Project), looking northwest (new ER and children's hospital completed 2010)

Geography
- Location: Peoria, Illinois, United States
- Coordinates: 40°42′10″N 89°35′28″W

Organization
- Care system: Charity (extensive source of area discounted or pro-bono care)
- Type: Teaching
- Religious affiliation: Franciscan Sisters of the Sacred Heart
- Affiliated university: Saint Francis College of Nursing, University of Illinois College of Medicine
- Patron: Franciscan Sisters of the Sacred Heart

Services
- Emergency department: Level I trauma center (adult and pediatric)
- Beds: 649

History
- Founded: 1876

Links
- Website: http://www.osfsaintfrancis.org/
- Lists: Hospitals in Illinois

OSF Saint Francis Medical Center, located in Peoria, Illinois, United States, is a teaching hospital for the University of Illinois College of Medicine at Peoria and part of the OSF Healthcare System. The center, which is the largest hospital in the Peoria metropolitan area and in central Illinois, is designated by the state of Illinois as the Level I adult and pediatric regional trauma center for a 26-county region in mid-Illinois.

OSF Saint Francis owns the Children's Hospital of Illinois (though the hospital has its own President), the OSF Saint Francis Heart Hospital, the Illinois Neurological Institute, and the Saint Francis Medical Center College of Nursing, which are all located either in or near the Medical Center. The hospital is a clinical training hospital for many medical students, interns, residents, and fellows of the Peoria campus of the University of Illinois College of Medicine.

It is the largest Level I trauma center for adults and children between the Chicago, Rockford and St. Louis metropolitan area. It is the fourth largest hospital in all of Illinois.

== History ==
The first hospital unit of what later became the center was established in 1876 by a group of Franciscan Sisters who had been sent to Peoria, Illinois from a German expatriate group settled in Iowa City, Iowa. In 1877, the Sisters who had migrated to Peoria were granted permission to form an independent religious community and became "The Sisters of the Third Order of St. Francis, Peoria, Illinois".

In 2009 and 2010, the Medical Center built a new emergency room. A new Children's Hospital of Illinois was built, with a new Level I pediatric and a Level III neonatal intensive care unit (the only one in Central Illinois) and emergency room. The Milestone Project was the largest expansion in the hospital's history. The hospital is now home to nearly all pediatric and adult services.

== About ==
The hospital offers adult and pediatric renal transplantation and adult pancreatic transplantation; most of the time, adult, and especially, pediatric, cardiac transplantation cases are referred to tertiary care academic medical transplantation centers in Chicago or St. Louis, though there are facilities and surgeons and physicians available for cardiac transplantation at the center's Heart Institute and at the Children's Hospital, and they have been performed there repeatedly. The hospital offers advanced burn care, hyperbaric, and debridement and grafting services for both children and adults, and sometimes, if need be, can transfer very severe cases to the certified state burn units in Springfield, Chicago or St. Louis.

The center's new Jump Simulation & Education Center is used for bioengineering, biochemical research, research on new devices and tissues and grafts, and medical and nursing and bioengineering training.

In 2024, a new Comprehensive (level I) adult and pediatric cancer center will be fully opened; it will be the largest between Chicago and St. Louis, and will have most or all of the latest therapies available, including proton beam treatments.

=== Organization ===
The Sisters of the Third Order of St. Francis (led by Sister Judith Ann Duvall, O.S.F.) is established as a non-profit organization and is the parent company of OSF Healthcare, which in turn is the operator of the OSF Healthcare System. The religious order of nuns and the hospital is not considered a part of the Roman Catholic Diocese of Peoria, but still works closely with it. The System consists of 13 facilities in Illinois, including the center, plus one in Escanaba, Michigan.

=== Awards ===
In 2000, the center was listed among the "Most Wired Hospitals and Health Systems" by Hospitals & Health Networks, an indicator of the degree to which information technology was used in the center.

The center received a Lantern Award in 2013 for nursing care in the emergency department. The center is also the #1 hospital in the state of Illinois for organ recovery. In 2017, it was ranked fifth by U.S. News & World Report in three-way tie for the state's top hospitals.

== Children's Hospital of Illinois ==
Children's Hospital of Illinois (CHOI) is a nationally ranked pediatric acute care hospital located within OSF Saint Francis Medical Center in Peoria, Illinois. The hospital has 144 beds. It is affiliated with The University of Illinois College of Medicine, and is a member of OSF Health. The hospital provides comprehensive pediatric specialties and subspecialties to infants, children, teens, and young adults aged 0–21 throughout Central Illinois. CHOI also sometimes treats adults that require pediatric care. Children's Hospital of Illinois features the only pediatric Level 1 Trauma Center in the region, and 1 of 4 in the state.
