= Thorek Memorial Hospital Andersonville =

- Thorek Memorial Hospital

Geography
- Location: Chicago, Illinois, United States
- Coordinates: 41.9732°N 87.6732°W

Organization
- Type: General

Services
- Beds: 145

History
- Former name: Methodist Hospital of Chicago
- Founded: 1942; 84 years ago

Links
- Website: thorekandersonville.org
- Lists: Hospitals in Illinois

Thorek Memorial Hospital Andersonville, formerly Methodist Hospital of Chicago, is a 145-bed hospital located in Uptown, Chicago's Andersonville and Ravenswood neighborhoods. It is part of the Thorek Memorial Hospital health system.

== History ==
Thorek Memorial Hospital Andersonville traces its roots to the Bethany Retirement Community, which was founded in 1889 and by 1930 was recognized as a national leader in providing high-quality care for seniors.

In 1942, with Bethany's infirmary having reached capacity, the Methodist Hospital of Chicago was constructed next door to serve residents and neighbors of all ages.

On October 1, 2019, Thorek Memorial Hospital acquired both Bethany Retirement Community and the Methodist Hospital. Following the acquisition, the facilities were rebranded as Thorek Retirement Home and Thorek Memorial Hospital Andersonville.

In 2023, Thorek announced plans to convert a portion of the retirement home into affordable housing for seniors.
