= Max Thorek =

American surgeon

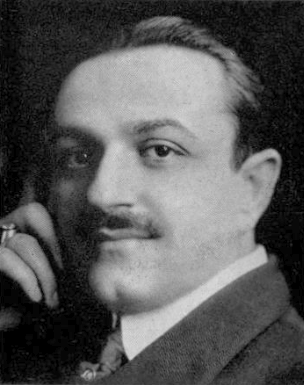
- Born: 10 March 1880; Hungary
- Died: 25 January 1960 (aged 79); Chicago, Illinois, US
- Burial place: Rosehill Cemetery
- Education: University of Chicago; Rush Medical College
- Occupation: Surgeon
- Spouse: Fannie "Fim" Unger (m. 1905)
- Children: Phillip Thorek
- Honours: Chevalier, Legion of Honour

Max Thorek (10 March 1880 – 25 January 1960) was a Hungarian-American surgeon best known for founding Thorek Memorial Hospital, the International College of Surgeons, and the International Museum of Surgical Science.

== Biography ==
Max Thorek was born to a Jewish family in rural Hungary. Both his parents were doctors: his father was a physician and his mother was a mid-wife with a degree in obstetrics. While Thorek was a student in Budapest, his brother was murdered in an antisemitic pogrom. Thorek's family fled to the United States to escape antisemitism, choosing to settle in Chicago because they had a relative there.

Although Thorek wished to become a doctor, his parents could not afford the cost of tuition. In response, Thorek learned how to play the snare drum to qualify for a scholarship from the University of Chicago Band.

After graduating from the University of Chicago, Thorek completed his medical degree at Rush Medical College in 1904. He later worked in obstetrics, gynecology, general, and reconstructive surgery, including at Cook County Hospital.

On April 16, 1905, Thorek married Fannie "Fim" Unger. Together with Dr. Solomon Greenspahn, they founded the American Hospital in 1911 at 2058 W. Monroe Street. Their goal was to serve patients based on need, regardless of their ability to pay. Thorek had a passion for the theater, and was concerned that many performers had nowhere to turn when they fell ill or were hurt. Therefore, in its early years, they devoted the 25-bed hospital specifically to serving the performing arts community. In 1916, Thorek and Greenspahn moved the hospital to Irving Park Road in Uptown, where it still operates as of 2025, now known as Thorek Memorial Hospital. The hospital has cared for famous performers such as Mae West, Harry Houdini, Buffalo Bill, the Marx Brothers, Sarah Bernhardt, and Al Jolson.

In the 1930s, Thorek introduced a surgical technique that significantly reduced the mortality rate in gallbladder operations. In 1935, he founded the International College of Surgeons and was awarded the Legion of Honour by the French government in recognition of his contribution to science and his humanitarian work.

Thorek became an internationally acclaimed amateur photographer during the pictorialist movement, and author of several books on the subject, including Camera Art as a Means of Self-Expression (1947) and Creative Camera Art (1937). In 1943, he published his autobiography entitled A Surgeon's World.

In 1954, Thorek founded the International Museum of Surgical Science in a Gold Coast mansion.

Unfortunately, despite his many contributions to society, Thorek continued to endure antisemitic discrimination even after moving to the United States. In 1930, for instance, Thorek was forced to file a lawsuit against the 3920 Lake Shore Drive Building Corporation for refusing to allow his family to move into an apartment they owned because they were Jewish.

Thorek died in Chicago on 25 January 1960. He is buried at Rosehill Cemetery.

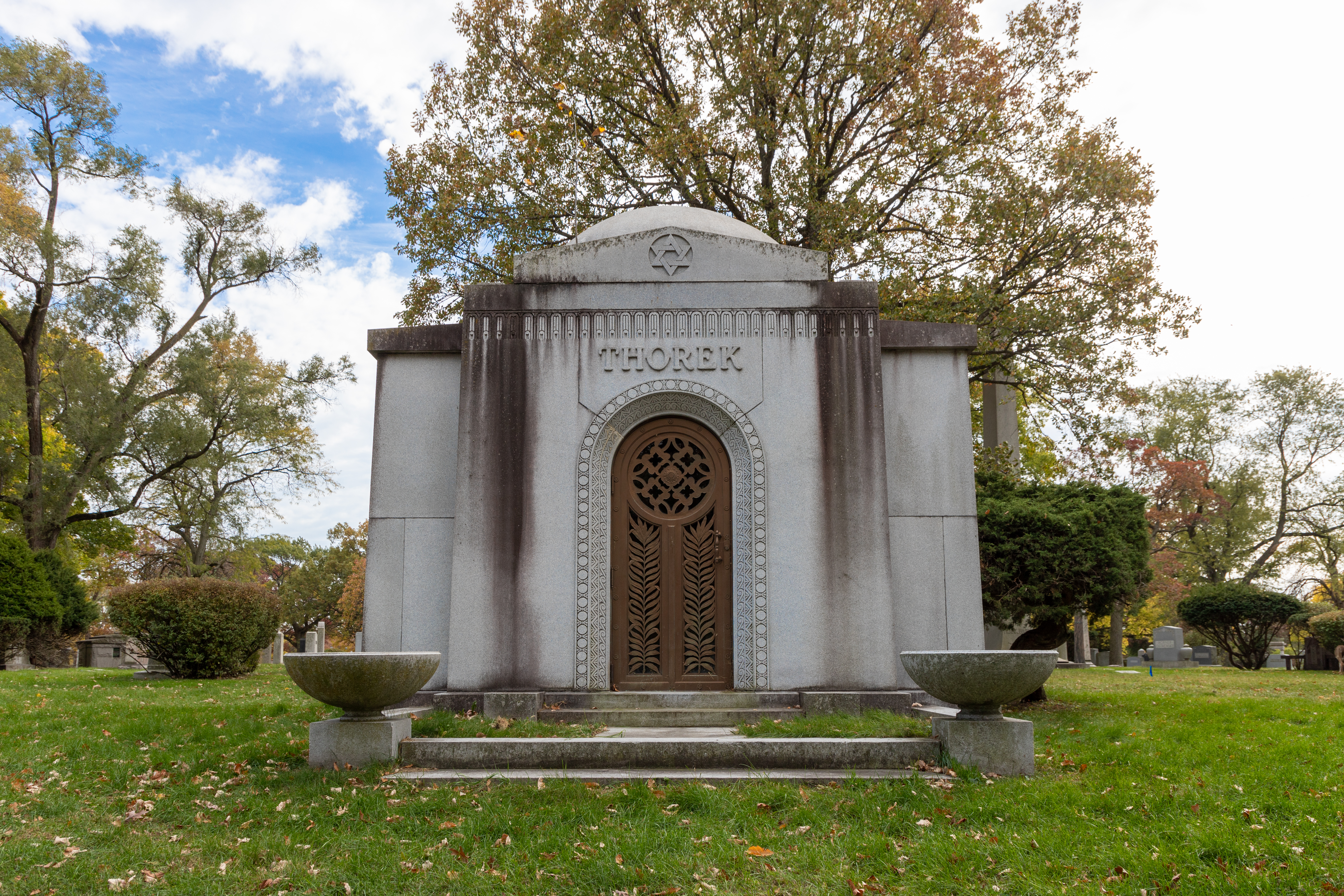
Thorek Mausoleum at Rosehill Cemetery
