= Congregation of Divine Providence, Mainz =

Coordinates: 49°59′14″N 8°10′33″E

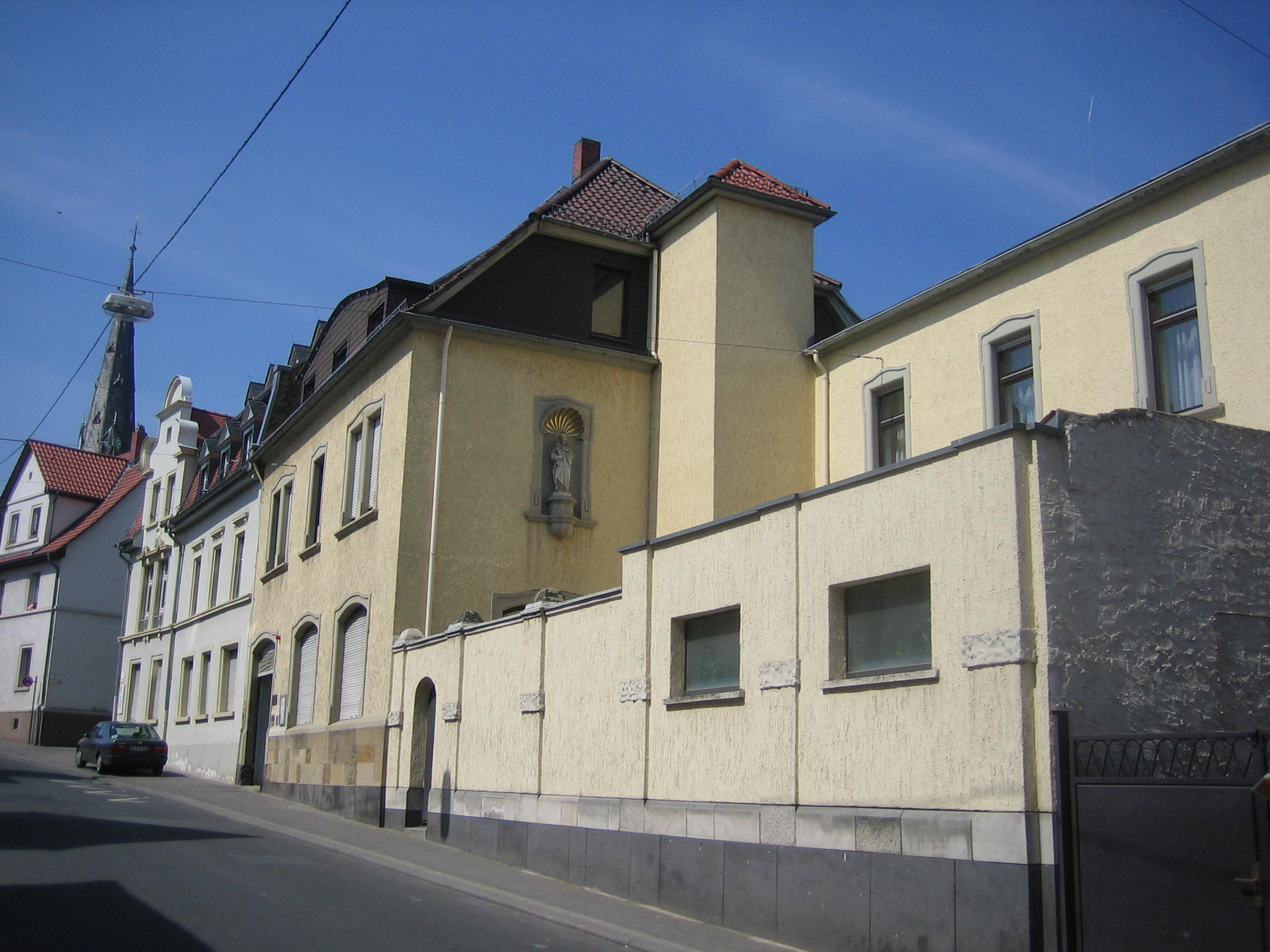
Streetview of the General Motherhouse in Mainz

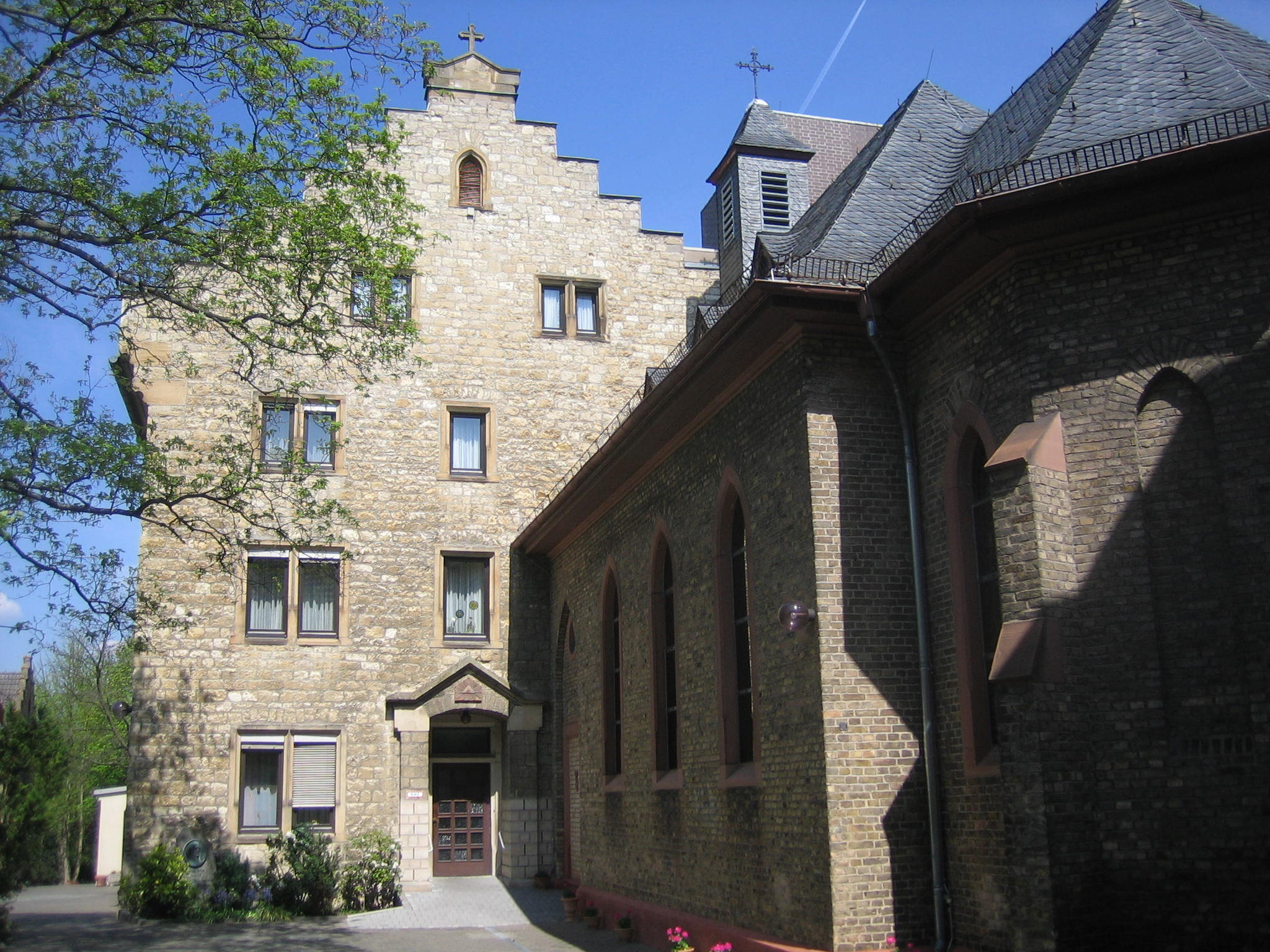
Facade of the General Motherhouse in Mainz

The Congregation of Divine Providence (Latin: Congregatio Divinae Providentiae; German: Schwestern von der Göttlichen Vorsehung) is a Catholic religious institute of women that was founded in 1851 in the Grand Duchy of Hesse by Wilhelm Emmanuel von Ketteler, Bishop of Mainz, together with Stephanie Fredericke Amalie de la Roche von Starkenfels (1812–1857), a French noblewoman. The congregation was formally recognized by the Holy See on 16 July 1935.

The Sisters of Divine Providence began to serve in the Americas in 1876, now present in the United States, Puerto Rico, Santo Domingo and Peru. They also serve in Korea.

== History ==
=== Founding ===
Kettler was a leading figure in the religious response to the social upheavals of the period in Germany, becoming known for his stands in social justice. He was a strong supporter of organized labor and a decent wage for workers. As part of his efforts to serve the struggling people of his diocese, he founded the Sisters of Divine Providence in the Mainz borough of Finthen on 29 October 1851. The Sisters provided both educational and nursing care to the towns in which they served. He appointed De la Roche, who had been given the religious name of Mother Marie, as the first Mother Superior of the new community.

=== Growth ===
When the Sisters of Divine Providence began to operate again in the late 19th century, after the loss of their institutions under the German policy of Kulturkampf, they opened the following nursing facilities: Josefsstift (1890–1973) (now the Ketteler Nursing Home), and the Gastell'sches Hospital (later the De la Roche Nursing Home) in Mombach (1892–1984), St. Elizabeth Women's Clinic (1893–1906), Mary Nursing Home (1898–1912), the municipal nursing home of Heinsberg (1958–1969), St. Hildegarde Nursing Home, now the Catholic Clinic of Mainz (1912) and the Wilhelm-Emmanuel-von-Ketteler School (1973).

During the 1920s, the American Province of St. Peter, based in Pittsburgh, Pennsylvania, had requested the Holy See for autonomy from the congregation in Germany. Instead, the advice was given that provinces should be established. This led to the establishment of three provinces in Germany: Mainz, Offenbach am Main and Bad Homburg, with the one American province in Pittsburgh.

=== Expansion to America ===
==== Pittsburgh, Pennsylvania ====
In 1876 the congregation answered the request for teachers of Richard Gilmour, the Bishop of Cleveland, and sent six sisters to the United States to begin a new foundation, under the leadership of Xavier Schneider. Sailing from Germany on 7 June, they arrived in New York on 25 June, only to find that the priest in whose parish they were to serve, Edward J. Vattrnann of St. Philip Neri Parish in Dungannon, Ohio (now part of Hanoverton, Ohio), never arrived to meet them. They then traveled on their own by train to Cleveland, only to learn that to get to Dungannon required a further 4-hour journey by stagecoach. The sisters arrived and found a community living in deep poverty. They often starved, despite the goodwill of the people they served.

A chance visitor advised these sisters to settle in Pittsburgh, Pennsylvania, to teach the children of the many German immigrants settled in that region. At the invitation of the pastor Hune of Sts. Peter and Paul Parish in the East Liberty section of Pittsburgh, they relocated in that parish, where they soon built St. Joseph Motherhouse. As the community expanded, they began to staff parochial schools in the region and eventually became St. Peter's Province, comprised by the sisters in the United States.

==== St. Louis, Missouri ====
The Sisters of Divine Providence first arrived in St. Louis, Missouri, in 1879, just three years after their arrival in the United States. They moved farther west in order to teach, specifically the children of German immigrants in St. Louis. There they staffed St. Francis de Sales School from 1879 to 1903.

Aloysia Bansbach, the new Provincial Superior of the Province of St. Peter, would visit her brother, who was a resident of St. Louis, Missouri. While on a visit there in 1920 she was introduced to a local priest, Peter Paul Kaenders, pastor of St. Mark Catholic Church in Venice, Illinois, who had recently purchased a hospital in Granite City, Illinois, just across the Mississippi River from the city. He wanted to convert the hospital to serve the Catholic community of the region, which included a large German immigrant population, and he invited Bansbach to purchase it for that purpose.

The Provincial Council agreed to the sale and in January 1921 six Sisters of Divine Providence arrived at the hospital and assumed responsibility for it. They renamed it St. Elizabeth Hospital, which they operated until 2001 (now Gateway Regional Medical Center). By 1926 the sisters had expanded into education in the area. The community there grew sufficiently so that, on 1 August 1930, they were formed into a separate province of the congregation.

The Sisters of Divine Providence also staffed many Catholic elementary schools in the Dioceses of Belleville, Illinois, Springfield, Illinois, Shreveport, Louisiana, Springfield-Cape Girardeau, Missouri, Jefferson City, Missouri and the Archdiocese of St. Louis. They operated Mount Providence School for Boys in Normandy, Missouri, for 64 years, which also served as the provincial motherhouse.

==== Puerto Rico ====
The Sisters of the Province of St. Peter answered a request for help by the Holy Ghost Fathers and established a mission there in 1932. A community of six sisters was sent, who settled in the town of Arecibo and began to teach in the Casino of Arecibo. They also would teach the Catholic faith to the children of the surrounding countryside. In addition to their other challenges to service on the Caribbean island, for ten years they had to share a house with the family from whom they had purchased it.

The sisters later established a new mission in the town of Utuado.

==== New England ====
The congregation acquired a former dairy farm in Kingston, Massachusetts, in 1946. This served as both a summer camp and the site of Sacred Heart School. Later the sisters founded Sacred Heart High School on the grounds.

The sisters began to staff schools in Vermont as well. They eventually were all formed into the Province of New England.

== Current status ==
In 2001, the three American provinces—Pittsburgh, St. Louis and New England, together with the region of Puerto Rico and the mission of Santo Domingo, became one United States-Caribbean province, called the Marie de la Roche Province.

At present, the congregation has three provinces: Germany, United States-Caribbean and Korea. There are also Sisters of Divine Province serving in Peru, which is a semi-autonomous region. As of 2013, the congregation currently numbers 460 vowed members and 184 associates.

In St. Louis, the sisters operate Room at the Inn, for homeless families, and La Posada Providencia in Texas for immigrant families.

== Literature ==
- Preller, Karl Philipp (1951). 100 Jahre Mainzer Schwestern von der göttlichen Vorsehung (1851-1951): Ein Ketteler-Werk u. Denkmal (in German). Mainz: Schwestern von d. Göttl. Vorsehung. OCLC 73646785.

== See also ==
- La Roche College, a college near Pittsburgh, Pennsylvania, was founded and is administered by the Sisters of the congregation.
- Congregation of Divine Providence
- Sisters of Divine Providence
