= Tabernacle Community Hospital and Health Center =

Geography
- Location: 5421 S. Morgan Avenue, Chicago, Illinois, United States

Services
- Beds: 175

History
- Opened: 1972
- Closed: 1977

Links
- Lists: Hospitals in Illinois

Tabernacle Community Hospital and Health Center (1972-1977), located at 5421 S. Morgan Avenue, was a short-lived, 175-bed hospital serving the African-American community of Chicago, Illinois. It was founded and run by Dr. Louis Rawls, pastor of the Tabernacle Missionary Baptist Church, on the south side of Chicago, from 1941 until his death in 2002. The Church purchased and operated the then-closed facility of Evangelical Hospital, built in 1915, "in the heart of Chicago's inner city", planning to build a new facility for which funding was never obtained.

In 1977, the Chicago Board of Health prohibited the hospital from admitting new patients, and then from performing surgery, because of "the hospital's tax troubles, allegations of improper use of federal funds, and a series of fires that destroyed or damaged many of the hospital's administrative and patient records. Administrators and employees of the hospital were questioned Thursday [September 15] regarding the seventh fire in the institution since Sept. 8." "The fires... appear to have been set to destroy hospital records." The Internal Revenue Service had filed liens of $800,000 against the hospital. In addition, "the building is substandard for medical uses and has been deteriorating since its purchase by Tabernacle Baptist Church." The hospital's license was suspended, and it closed, on September 23, 1977.
