= University of Illinois Health =

Coordinates: 41°52′10.8″N 87°40′13.6″W

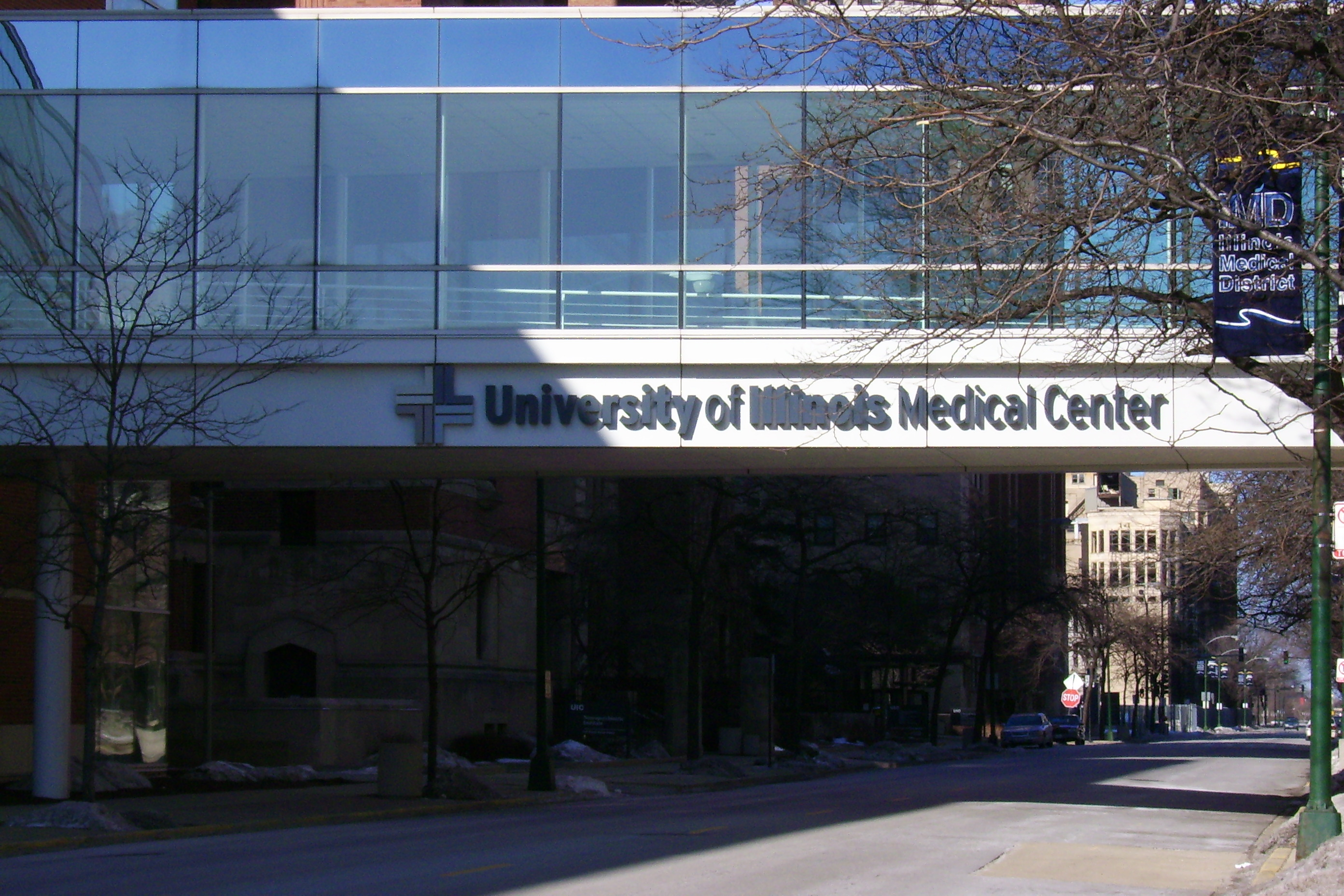

Geography
- Location: 1740 West Taylor Street, Chicago, Illinois, United States

Organization
- Type: Teaching/University
- Affiliated university: University of Illinois at Chicago

Services
- Emergency department: Yes
- Beds: 485

History
- Founded: 1919; 107 years ago

Links
- Website: hospital.uillinois.edu
- Lists: Hospitals in Illinois

The University of Illinois Health (UI Health; variously known as University of Illinois Hospital and Clinics and University of Illinois Hospital and Health Sciences System) is the academic medical center of the University of Illinois Chicago, located in the Illinois Medical District of Chicago, Illinois, United States. It is a teaching hopistal of the University of Illinois College of Medicine.

== History ==
The University of Illinois Hospital & Health Sciences System dates back to 1919, when a cooperative agreement between the University of Illinois and the Illinois Department of Public Welfare resulted in the construction of the Research and Educational Hospitals. Two years prior, in 1917, the State of Illinois had acquired the vacated Chicago Cubs Park located at Polk and Wolcott, which in turn was used by the University of Illinois to build two new medical college buildings and the hospital. The eventual aging of the Research and Educational Hospitals gave rise to the building of the current University of Illinois Hospital in 1980. Today, over 500 primary care physicians and specialists provide primary and specialty care to patients from the city, state and around the world.

In fiscal year 2010, approximately 14,000 inpatient and outpatient surgeries were performed, over 57,000 patients visited the emergency department, and 20,000 patients were admitted to the hospital.

The College of Medicine (COM) educates over 2,600 medical students and trainees. The community has collaborative relationships between the Medical Center and UIC's Health Science Colleges, which includes the Colleges of Medicine, Dentistry, Pharmacy, Allied Health Professions, Nursing and the School of Public Health.

In addition, the UIC campus hosts the Lions of Illinois Eye Research Institute, the Light House for the Blind, and the Illinois Eye and Ear Infirmary (IEEI).

In September 2020, during the COVID-19 pandemic, several hundred nurses and workers participated in the 2020 University of Illinois Hospital strikes.
