= Jacksonville Memorial Hospital =

Coordinates: 39.746307°N 90.260105°W

- Memorial Health System
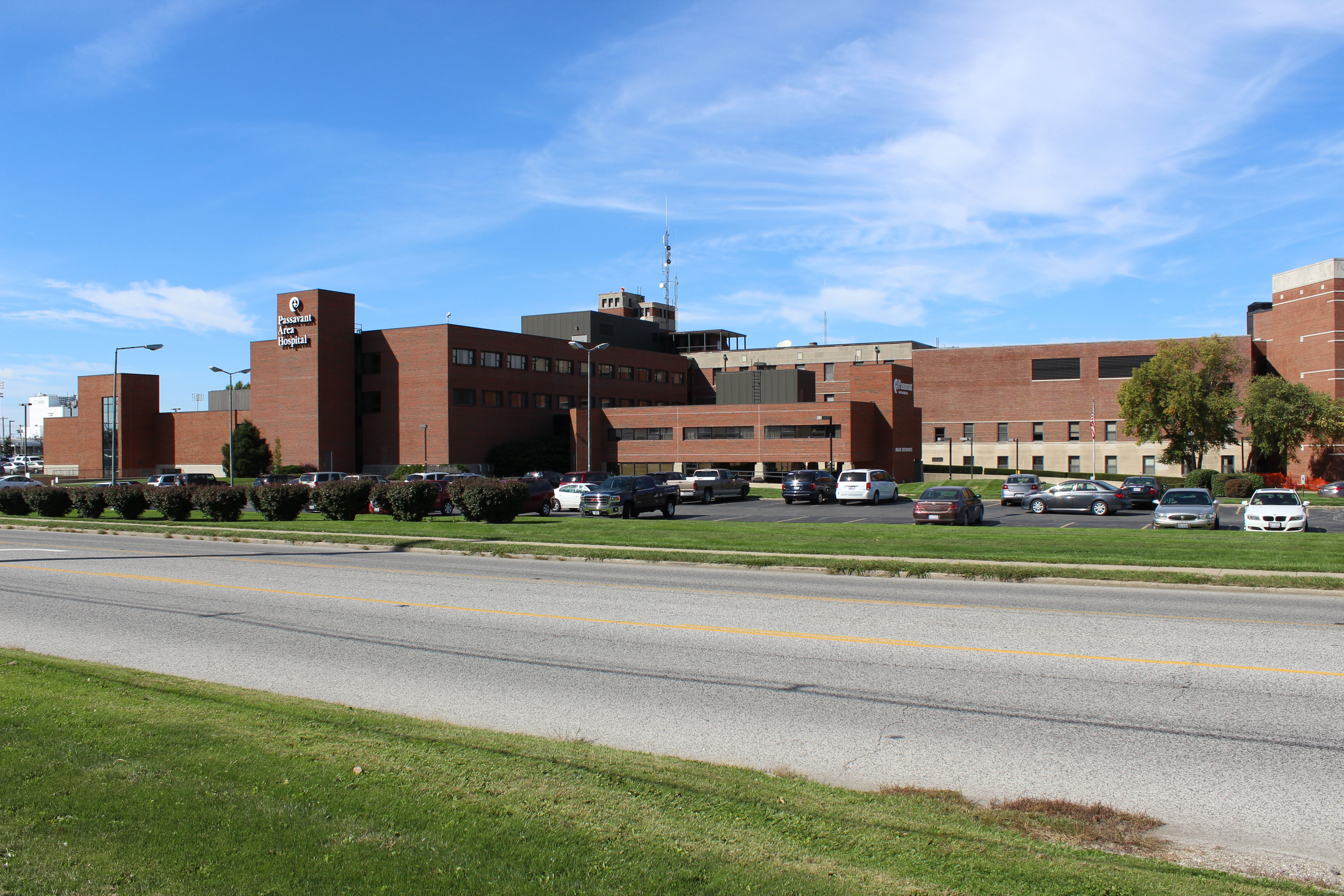

Geography
- Location: Jacksonville, Illinois, USA

Organisation
- Type: Non-profit

Services
- Beds: 93

History
- Founded: 1875

Links
- Website: memorial.health/jacksonville-memorial-hospital/overview
- Lists: Hospitals in Illinois

Jacksonville Memorial Hospital (JMH), formerly known as Passavant Area Hospital is located in Jacksonville, Illinois, and has served residents in the following counties since 1875: Morgan, Cass, Greene, Scott, Macoupin, and portions of Brown and northern Pike counties. Jacksonville Memorial Hospital is a twice-designated Magnet hospital and is also accredited by The Joint Commission. Jacksonville Memorial Hospital has approximately 900 employees and a 70 physician medical staff, making it the largest employer in Jacksonville.

Jacksonville Memorial Hospital provides inpatient and outpatient services, including rehab and behavioral health services. JMH is an affiliate of Memorial Health System based in Springfield, Illinois.
