= Northwestern Lake Forest Hospital =

Coordinates: 42°15′10″N 87°51′54″W

- Northwestern Medicine
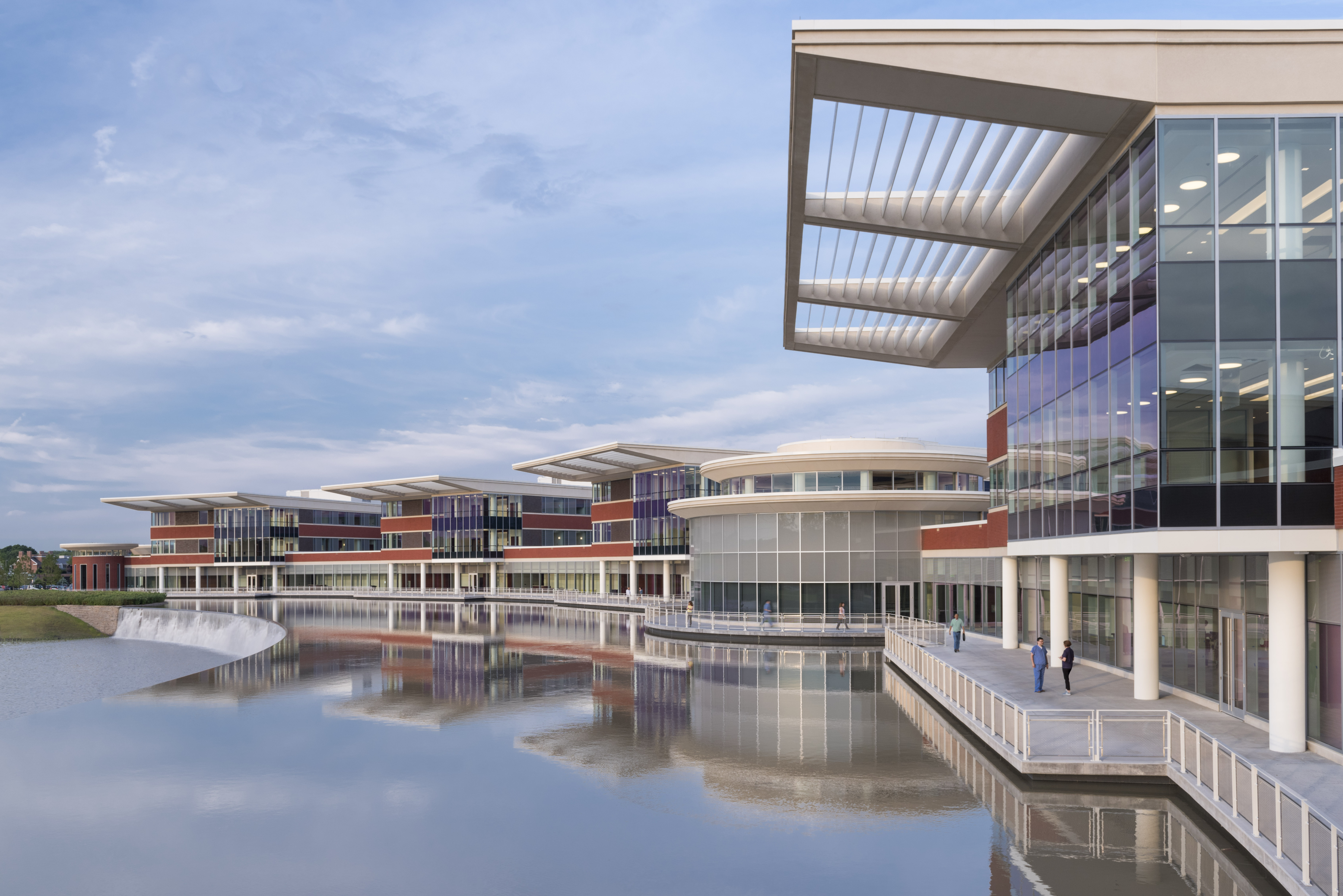
- Visitor entrance

Geography
- Location: 1000 North Westmoreland Road, Lake Forest, Illinois, United States

Organization
- Care system: Not-for-profit
- Type: General
- Affiliated university: Northwestern University; Feinberg School of Medicine

Services
- Emergency department: Level II Trauma (Lake Forest); Level II Trauma(Grayslake)
- Beds: 201

History
- Opened: 1899 (Alice Home); 1942 (Lake Forest Hospital); 2010 (Northwestern Lake Forest Hospital); 2025 (Northwestern Medicine Catherine Gratz Griffin Lake Forest Hospital)

Links
- Lists: Hospitals in Illinois

Northwestern Lake Forest Hospital (formally Northwestern Medicine Catherine Gratz Griffin Lake Forest Hospital) is a community-based hospital in Lake Forest, Illinois, United States, and a wholly owned subsidiary of Northwestern Memorial Healthcare, one of the nation's premiere academic medical centers. The hospital was established in 1899 as Alice Home on the campus of Lake Forest College, and in 1942 a new hospital was built in its current location as Lake Forest Hospital. On February 1, 2010, Lake Forest Hospital completed an affiliation agreement with Northwestern Memorial HealthCare and became Northwestern Lake Forest Hospital.

The 201-bed hospital is on a 160-acre (65 ha) campus in Lake Forest and provides a comprehensive array of inpatient and outpatient medical and surgical services. At the main campus in Lake Forest, services include an inpatient hospital, a women's center providing maternity and breast care services, a health and fitness center and a nursing care facility. The hospital has 700 board-certified physicians specializing in 90 specialties on its medical staff.

Northwestern Lake Forest Hospital is a partner of Lurie Children's Hospital in Chicago, one of the nation's top-ranked children's hospitals. Lurie Children's Outpatient Center and Lurie Children's hospitalists and neonatologists provide infant and pediatric care 24 hours a day to patients at Northwestern Lake Forest Hospital.

== History ==
=== Alice Home ===
In 1882, no hospital existed in Lake Forest, Illinois, a small town best known as a summer getaway for Chicago residents. Dr. Alfred C. Haven, a recent newcomer to the town, was Lake Forest's only physician, and the closest hospital was located in Waukegan, Illinois. With the assistance of James G.K. McClure, Lake Forest University (later known as Lake Forest College) President and First Presbyterian Church Pastor, Dr. Haven raised both financial backing and public support for a hospital on the Lake Forest University campus. In 1889, Alice Home opened as the community hospital.

In 1908, Alice Home expanded by building Contagious Hospital, an isolating, separate hospital to care for patients affected by outbreaks of tuberculosis, scarlet fever, typhoid, measles, mumps, diphtheria and whooping cough. In 1918, the Hospital Association of Lake Forest was certified as a legally organized not-for-profit organization, independent of Lake Forest College. In 1921, this association, along with the City of Lake Forest, Lake Forest College, and Alice Home and Contagious Hospital trustees, agreed to consolidate Alice Home and Contagious Hospital into one entity.

=== Lake Forest Hospital ===
By 1940, Lake Forest had radically changed from a summer destination to a year-round, permanent residence for many families. The significant increase in population strained Alice Home's resources. Between 1939 and 1940, the clinical staff at Alice Home managed more than 600 operations, 2,000 outpatients and 3,000 lab tests. Without the ability to expand further onto the college campus, community members and hospital staff began considering the establishment of a new, larger institution to meet these growing needs. Mrs. Mary Dick, wife of the late Albert Blake Dick Sr., lived alone on the Westmoreland Farm (named after the family's origins in Westmoreland, Pennsylvania) in Lake Forest, Illinois. In 1940, A.B. Dick Jr., her son, successfully convinced his mother that 23 acres of the family farmland ought to be donated for the new hospital. The road leading to the hospital was renamed Westmoreland Road in honor of the Dick family's generosity. Despite war rations, 300 individuals donated $800,000 for the construction of the hospital, including John G. Shedd and the McCormick families, and Lake Forest Hospital opened on November 1, 1942. By 1959, Lake Forest Hospital expanded from 65 to 101 beds and incorporated a hospital pharmacy. Two new wings were added at the west end of the hospital in 1967.

The City of Lake Forest continued to expand and the hospital provided the growing region with new technology and specialized care. In the late 1960s, Lake Forest Hospital acquired a cobalt machine to improve cancer treatment, an advancement unheard of for a community hospital at the time. By 1979, Lake Forest Hospital established the Westmoreland Long-term Care Center (now Westmoreland Nursing Center), speech and audiology departments, the Center for Pain Treatment and Rehabilitation and the department for Blood Component Therapy. With the opening of the McGaw Medical Building in 1981, Lake Forest Hospital became the first comprehensive healthcare campus in the region. By the late 1980s, Lake Forest Hospital consolidated outpatient surgical services, established the first cardio-pulmonary rehabilitation program in Lake County, constructed its emergency helipad, upgraded radiology to include nuclear medicine and achieved a Level II trauma designation.

Off-campus medical facilities, providing closer access to care, included the addition of a facility in Vernon Hills in 1986 and medical offices in Gurnee and Libertyville in 1991 and 1997, respectively. In a continuing effort to move away from treating disease and towards fostering holistic health, the hospital opened two health and fitness centers: one on the Lake Forest Hospital campus (1994) and another in Lindenhurst (2000) In 2004, the Hunter Family Center for Women's Health, encompassing the Waud Family Maternity Services and the Posy Krehbiel Breast Care Center, opened.

In 2004, the hospital opened an outpatient facility in Grayslake. The new campus offered acute care delivered by board-certified emergency room physicians, audiology and speech therapy, imaging, cardiac and laboratory testing, physical and occupational therapy, and physician offices. Less than six years after opening, the Grayslake Acute Care Center became an Emergency Center. In 2010, a new Cancer Center was added and in 2011 a Surgery Center opened at the campus.

On April 1, 2009, the hospital expanded its network of diagnostic imaging centers, adding services in Gurnee-Tower Court, Libertyville, and Glenview.

=== Northwestern Memorial HealthCare affiliation ===
On February 1, 2010, Lake Forest Hospital and Northwestern Memorial HealthCare announced an affiliation agreement to form a premier integrated healthcare system for Chicago. Lake Forest Hospital was renamed Northwestern Lake Forest Hospital and became a subsidiary of Northwestern Memorial HealthCare.

== Locations and services ==
=== Northwestern Lake Forest Hospital ===
The main hospital is located on a 160-acre campus was formerly located at 660 North Westmoreland Road in Lake Forest. Also on the campus is the Bays (900) Medical Office Building, McGaw (800) Medical Office Building, 700 Medical Office Buildings, Dearhaven Child Care and Learning Center, and the Lake Forest Health & Fitness Center. In 2017, a state of the art replacement hospital opened at 1000 North Westmoreland Road.

=== Northwestern Grayslake ===
The Northwestern Grayslake campus facility opened in 2004. Located at 1475 East Belvidere Road (Route 120) in Grayslake, Illinois, this location evolved quickly from an acute care center to a full-service outpatient campus. This location offers an Emergency Center, a Cancer Center and a Surgery Center.

Additional outpatient services include:

- Audiology
- Diagnostic Cardiology
- Diagnostic Imaging
- Emergency Center
- Laboratory Services
- Rehabilitative Services
- Speech Pathology

=== Satellite medical offices ===
Outpatient clinical services are delivered at facilities in Glenview, Gurnee-Brookside, Gurnee-Tower Court, Libertyville, Lindenhurst and Vernon Hills.

=== Health & fitness centers ===
Lake Forest Health & Fitness Center, located on the campus of Northwestern Lake Forest Hospital, and Lindenhurst Health & Fitness Center in Lindenhurst, Illinois are both owned and operated by the hospital.The Lindenhurst Health and Fitness Center is permanently closed.

== Recognition & awards ==
For eight consecutive years, Northwestern Lake Forest Hospital has been named the Consumer Choice Hospital for Lake and Kenosha counties according to a survey by National Research Corporation for having the best doctors, best image and reputation, best overall quality and being the most preferred for all health needs.

In 2011, Northwestern Lake Forest Hospital received two designations for its breast imaging facilities and its overall breast care. The hospital was awarded the American College of Radiology (ACR) Breast Magnetic Resonance Imaging (MRI) Accreditation. In addition, the hospital and Northwestern Grayslake were given a full three-year accreditation designation by the National Accreditation Program for Breast Centers (NAPBC).

In 2010, Northwestern Lake Forest Hospital earned Magnet Recognition from the American Nurses Credentialing Center (ANCC). Only six percent of hospitals across the country, and fewer than 400 hospitals worldwide, have achieved this distinction.

The hospital offers an accredited Outpatient Diabetes Education Program, certified by the American Association of Diabetes Education. The program is the first in Illinois to receive this recognition.

The Wellness 180˚ program at Lake Forest Health & Fitness Center won a 2010 Distinguished Achievement Award from the Medical Fitness Association for its innovation in warding off heart disease and Type II Diabetes.
