= Decatur Memorial Hospital =

Geography
- Location: Decatur, Illinois, United States

Organization
- Care system: US

Services
- Standards: Joint Commission
- Beds: 300

Helipads
- Helipad: FAA LID: 8IS6

History
- Founded: January 1, 1916

Links
- Website: https://memorial.health/dmh
- Lists: Hospitals in Illinois

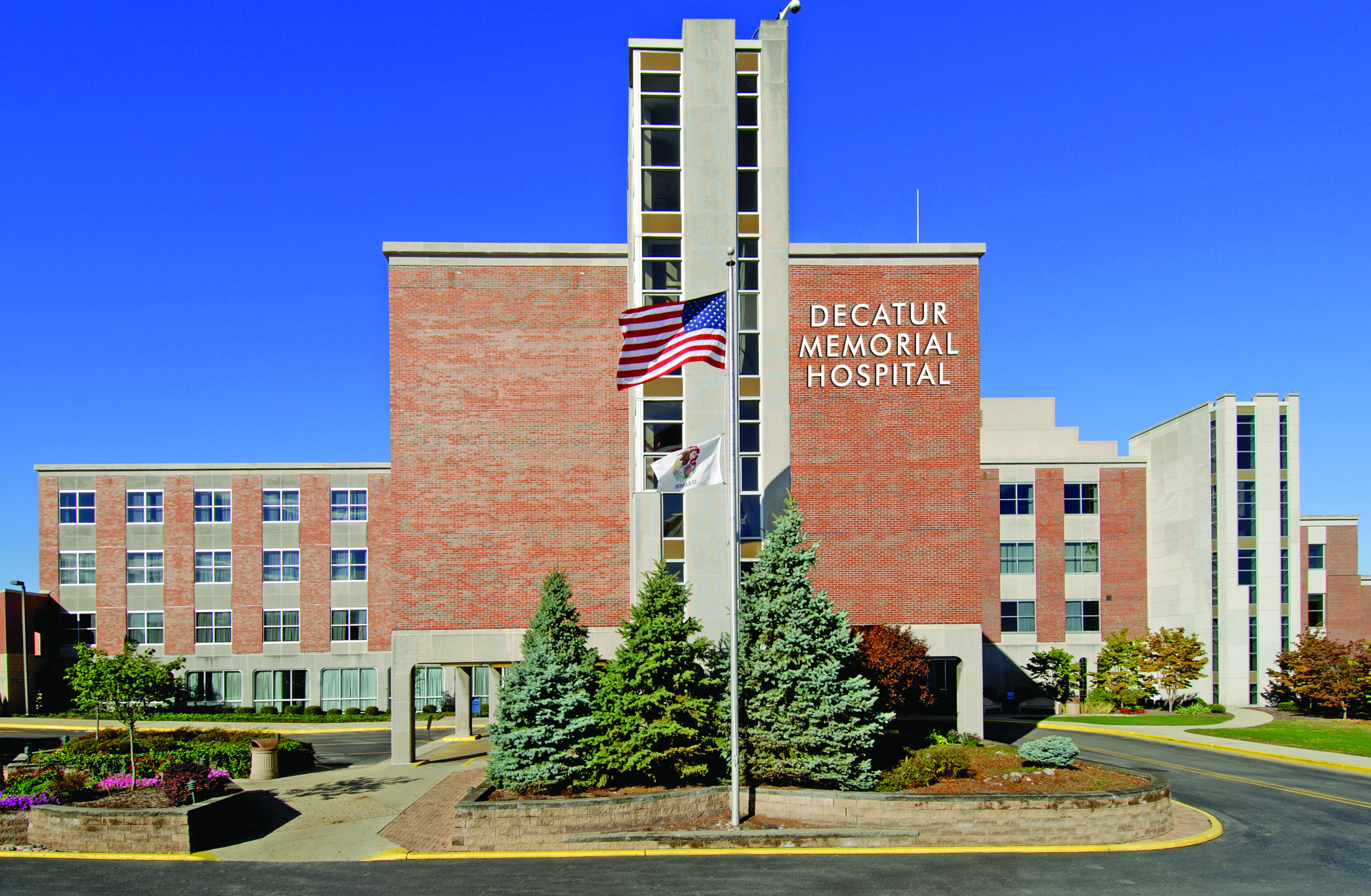
A picture of Decatur Memorial Hospital

Decatur Memorial Hospital (DMH), is a Decatur, Illinois affiliate of Memorial Medical Center (Springfield, Illinois) and is a 300-bed, not-for-profit, community hospital founded in 1916. DMH has more than 2,300 employees and 300 physicians. It is a designated Level II Trauma Center. On October 1, 2019, a merger with Memorial Medical Systems of Springfield was announced with Memorial Medical Center listed as the "parent company" in the Decatur Herald-Review.

== History ==
Sue Hagaman, citizen of Decatur, publicly advocated for the building of a community hospital to accommodate births. She approached Decatur doctor, Dr. William Barnes, who was instrumental in the planning and completion of the hospital. For 15 years, they planned, organized community members, and raised funds. On January 1, 1916, Decatur and Macon County Hospital opened its doors to patients. The name was changed to Decatur Memorial Hospital in 1968. DMH became an EMS Resource Hospital in November of 2023 and serves prehospital EMS agencies in Central Illinois. Decatur Memorial EMS protocols can be found at memorial.health/protocols.
