= Silver Cross Hospital =

Geography
- Location: New Lenox, Illinois, United States
- Coordinates: 41.54456°N 87.98327°W

Organization
- Type: General

Services
- Emergency department: Level II Trauma Center
- Beds: 348

History
- Opened: 1895

Links
- Website: www.silvercross.org
- Lists: Hospitals in Illinois

Silver Cross Hospital is a 348-bed acute care/general hospital founded in 1895. The hospital was located in Joliet, Illinois, before it relocated to its new campus on February 26, 2012, in New Lenox, Illinois.
