= Montrose Behavioral Health Hospital =

Coordinates: 41.9703°N 87.6505°W

Geography
- Location: Chicago, Illinois, United States

Links
- Website: www.montrosebehavioral.com
- Lists: Hospitals in Illinois

Montrose Behavioral Health Hospital (formerly Chicago Lakeshore Hospital) is a private behavioral health and addiction treatment center located in the north side of the city of Chicago, Illinois.

In 2011, Chicago Lakeshore Hospital was cited for poor staffing, lax oversight, and numerous reports of sexual assault. It opened its children's psychiatric center in 2013.

In 2018, federal authorities announced they were pulling funding from the hospital under investigation following numerous allegations of sexual abuse, assault and patient safety violations. All children in state care were removed from the facility after the ACLU of Illinois took action. Later that year, the facility's Medicare agreement was terminated.

In 2020, the hospital closed, discharging its final patient after years of scrutiny. The COVID-19 pandemic was cited as the reason for the facility’s closure.

In 2021, Acadia Healthcare purchased the hospital building and reopened the hospital as Montrose Behavioral Health Hospital.
