= Thorek Memorial Hospital =

Health system in Chicago, Illinois, US

Geography
- Location: 850 W. Irving Park Road Chicago, IL 60613
- Coordinates: 41.95500712854709°N 87.65150897379706°W

History
- Former name: American Hospital
- Opened: 1911; 115 years ago

Links
- Website: www.thorek.org

Thorek Memorial Hospital is a nonprofit health system and housing provider in Cook County, Illinois. Its main campus in Uptown, Chicago includes a 218-bed, acute care hospital facility. Thorek also operates facilities in Armour Square, West Town, and Skokie.

== History ==
Thorek Memorial Hospital was founded as the American Hospital by Dr. Max Thorek, his wife Fannie, and Dr. Solomon Greenspahn in 1911. Their goal was to serve patients based on need, regardless of their ability to pay. Dr. Thorek had a passion for the theater, and was concerned that many performers had nowhere to turn when they fell ill or were hurt. Therefore, in its early years, they devoted the 25-bed hospital specifically to serving the performing arts community.

In 1916, Drs. Thorek and Greenspahn moved the hospital to its current location on Irving Park Road in Uptown's Buena Park neighborhood. The hospital has cared for famous performers such as Mae West, Harry Houdini, Buffalo Bill, the Marx Brothers, Sarah Bernhardt, and Al Jolson.

Under the direction of Max and Fannie's son, Dr. Phillip Thorek, the hospital expanded its footprint, increased the number and types of services offered, and adopted new technology and equipment to improve patient care.

In 2019, Thorek acquired the Bethany Retirement Community and Methodist Hospital of Chicago in Uptown's Andersonville neighborhood. Bethany Retirement Community was founded in 1889 and by 1930 was recognized as a national leader in providing high-quality care for seniors. In 1942, with Bethany's infirmary having reached capacity, the Methodist Hospital of Chicago was constructed next door to serve residents and neighbors of all ages. Following the acquisition, the facilities were rebranded as Thorek Retirement Home and Thorek Memorial Hospital Andersonville.

== Facilities ==
As of 2025, Thorek Memorial Hospital operates the following facilities:

=== Hospitals ===
- Thorek Memorial Hospital (Buena Park, Chicago)
- Thorek Memorial Hospital Andersonville (Andersonville, Chicago)

=== Clinics ===
- China Square Clinic (Chinatown, Chicago)
- Thorek Skokie Office (Skokie, Illinois)
- Ukrainian Village Clinic (Ukrainian Village, Chicago)

=== Housing ===
- Thorek Retirement Home (Andersonville, Chicago)
- Ruth Shriman (Buena Park, Chicago)
- Sherway Tower (Buena Park, Chicago)
