= Northwestern Medicine =

Health network based in Illinois

- Formation: 2009
- Type: Non-profit organization
- Purpose: 501(c)(3) health system
- Headquarters: Chicago
- Region served: Illinois
- Services: Health System
- Key people: Howard Chrisman (CEO); John A. Orsini (CFO)
- Subsidiaries: Northwestern Memorial Hospital; Prentice Women's Hospital; Marianjoy Rehabilitation Hospital; Northwestern Medicine Central DuPage Hospital; Northwestern Medicine Delnor Hospital; Northwestern Medicine Huntley Hospital; Northwestern Medicine Kishwaukee Hospital; Northwestern Medicine Lake Forest Hospital; Northwestern Medicine McHenry Hospital; Northwestern Medicine Valley West Hospital; Northwestern Medicine Woodstock Hospital
- Affiliations: Feinberg School of Medicine; Lurie Children's Hospital; Ryan AbilityLab
- Website: nm.org

Northwestern Medicine is the healthcare system of Northwestern University, located in Chicago, Illinois. It include research hospitals, acute care facilities, and academic centers.

Northwestern Medicine's flagship hospital is Northwestern Memorial Hospital. Along with their 10 hospitals and physicians offices, Northwestern Medicine operates a network of urgent care centers across the region. While not operated with Northwestern Medicine, the network maintains close association with the nearby Lurie Children's Hospital and the Ryan AbilityLab.

== History ==
Northwestern Medicine, formerly Northwestern Memorial Healthcare, was effectively formed in 2009 when Northwestern Memorial Hospital and Lake Forest Hospital announce an affiliation agreement, with the finalized merger completed the next year, in 2010.

In 2014 Northwestern Medicine affiliated with Cadence Health adding four more hospitals to their lineup, including Northwestern Medicine Central DuPage Hospital and Northwestern Medicine Delnor Hospital. In 2015 Northwestern Medicine merged with the KishHealth System adding two hospitals including the Northwestern Medicine Kishwaukee Hospital and Northwestern Medicine Valley West Hospital. In 2018, Northwestern Medicine absorbed the Centegra Health System. In December 2020 it was announced that Northwestern Medicine would be merging with Palos Health adding another hospital to Northwestern Medicine's network, in an agreement with no money changing hands. This merger occurred after Palos previously denied Loyola Health's request to merge in 2019. As of October 2021, Northwestern Medicine included eleven hospitals.

== Hospitals ==
(incomplete list)

=== Northwestern Memorial Hospital ===
Northwestern Memorial Hospital (NMH) is a nationally ranked academic medical center located in the Streeterville neighborhood of Chicago, Illinois. It is the flagship campus for Northwestern Medicine and the primary teaching hospital for the Feinberg School of Medicine at Northwestern University. Northwestern Memorial provides a total of 943 inpatient beds and encompasses more than 3 million square feet of medical buildings within the Northwestern University Chicago campus in the Streeterville neighborhood downtown. Nearly every medical specialty is represented by over 1,900 physicians on the medical staff at Northwestern Memorial who also carry faculty appointments with Feinberg School of Medicine. As of 2018, total hospital-based research funding topped $484 million placing Northwestern in the top 15 for the National Institutes of Health ranking among all American Medical Schools.

=== Prentice Women’s Hospital ===
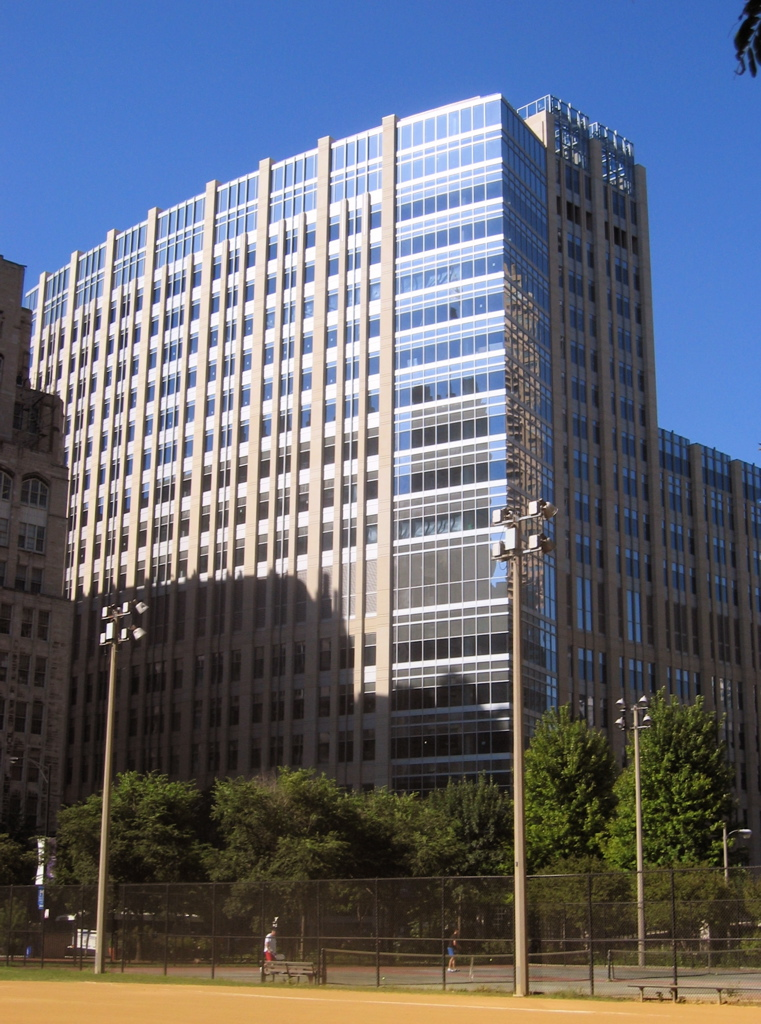
The Prentice Women's Hospital building, Chicago, Illinois

Prentice Women’s Hospital is an acute care women's hospital located adjacent to both Northwestern Memorial and the Lurie Children's Hospital. The hospital provides tertiary-level obstetric, gynecological, and neonatal care to patients from the entire region. The hospital has 256 beds, with 86 AAP verified level III neonatal intensive care unit beds, 32 labor and delivery beds, 86 healthy bassinets, and 10 operating rooms. The hospital is directly attached to the Lurie Children's Hospital via skybridge because Lurie physicians provide care on Prentice's neonatal intensive care units.

=== Robert H. Lurie Comprehensive Cancer Center ===
The Robert H. Lurie Comprehensive Cancer Center (Lurie Cancer Center), is a National Cancer Institute (NCI)–designated Comprehensive Cancer Center located within the Northwestern Memorial Hospital in the Streeterville neighborhood of Chicago, Illinois, United States. One of two NCI-designated cancer centers in Illinois, Lurie Cancer Center is composed of collaborative academic and research efforts between the Feinberg School of Medicine, Northwestern University, Northwestern Medicine, Lurie Children's Hospital, the Shirley Ryan AbilityLab and the Jesse Brown Veterans Affairs Medical Center. Additionally, the center is a member of the Big Ten Cancer Research Consortium.

=== Lake Forest Hospital ===
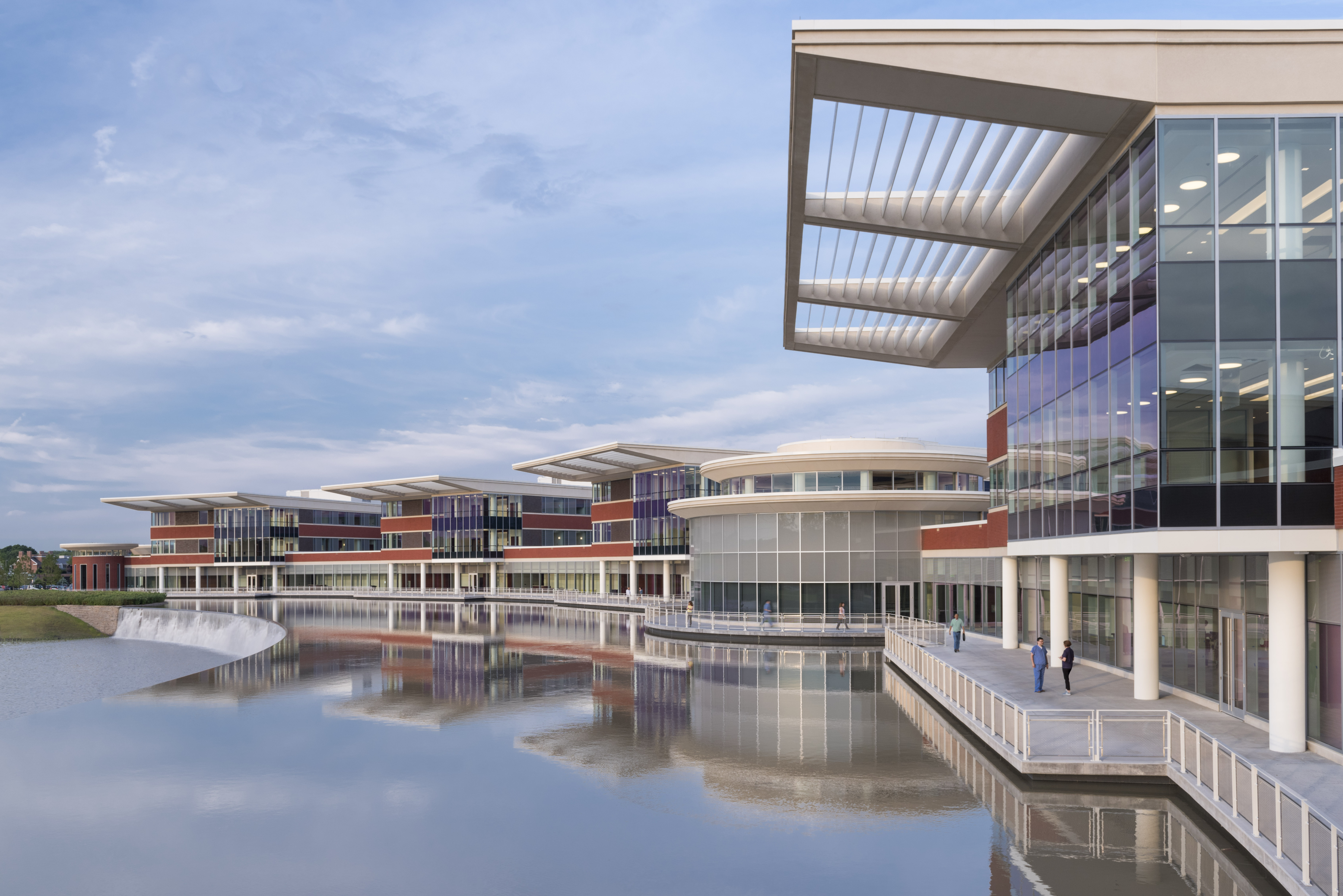
Northwestern Medicine's Lake Forest Hospital, a New facility that opened in March 2018

Northwestern Lake Forest Hospital (NLFH) is a community-based hospital in Lake Forest, Illinois, and a wholly owned subsidiary of Northwestern Memorial HealthCare, one of the nation's premiere academic medical centers. On February 1, 2010, Lake Forest Hospital completed an affiliation agreement with Northwestern Memorial HealthCare and became Northwestern Lake Forest Hospital. The 201-bed hospital is on a 160-acre (65 ha) campus in Lake Forest and provides a comprehensive array of inpatient and outpatient medical and surgical services.

=== Central DuPage Hospital ===
Northwestern Medicine Central DuPage Hospital (CDH) is a 390-bed hospital in Winfield, Illinois, US, one of seven hospitals operated by Northwestern Medicine. CDH became one of the first hospitals in the Chicago area to perform open-heart surgery on a beating heart, and as of 2020 was ranked 8th in the Best Hospitals in Illinois list by U.S. News, but not nationally ranked in any specialty.

=== Marianjoy Rehabilitation Hospital ===
Marianjoy Rehabilitation Hospital is a 120-bed hospital in Wheaton, Illinois, dedicated to the delivery of physical rehabilitative medicine. Marianjoy has a network of inpatient, subacute, and outpatient sites and physician clinics around the Chicago area including Oak Park, Oakbrook Terrace, and Wheaton.

=== McHenry Hospital ===
Northwestern Medicine McHenry Hospital is a hospital in McHenry, Illinois. Previously, the hospital was called Northern Illinois Medical Center and later Centegra Hospital - McHenry. The hospital is a division of Northwestern Medicine since 2018 when Northwestern Medicine partnered with Centegra Health System.

=== Woodstock Hospital ===
Northwestern Medicine Woodstock Hospital (formerly Centegra Hospital - Woodstock) is a hospital in Woodstock, Illinois. The hospital is a division of Northwestern Medicine since 2018 when Northwestern Medicine partnered with Centegra Health System.

== See also ==
- Northwestern University
- Feinberg School of Medicine
- Northwestern Memorial Hospital
