= Gateway Regional Medical Center =

Geography
- Location: Granite City, Illinois, US
- Coordinates: 38.70112°N 90.14329°W

Organisation
- Care system: US
- Funding: For-Profit

Services
- Standards: Joint Commission
- Beds: 338
- Helipad: FAA LID: 38LL

History
- Opened: c. 1900

Links
- Website: http://www.gatewayregional.net

Gateway Regional Medical Center is an American hospital in Granite City, Illinois. It contains 305 licensed beds, 100 of which are for treatment of acute mental illness in the behavioral health unit. The hospital and its predecessors have served the greater Madison County area for more than 100 years.

== History ==
The hospital was founded about 1900 as a private facility. It was acquired around 1920 by a Catholic priest, the Rev. Peter Paul Kaenders, Pastor of St. Mark Catholic Church in Venice, Illinois, who wanted to convert the hospital to serve the Catholic community of the region, which included a large German immigrant population.

Unsuccessful at first, Kaenders met Mother Aloysia Bansbach, the Provincial Superior of the Religious Sisters of the Congregation of Divine Providence—founded in Mainz, Germany—in the United States. In 1920, the Sisters paid $50,000 to purchase it, and they began to operate it in January 1921 under the name of St. Elizabeth Hospital. The Sisters of Divine Providence owned, operated and staffed the hospital until 2001, when it was sold and renamed Gateway Regional Medical Center.

== Current ==
With a medical staff of more than 150 physicians, the hospital provides a wide range of health care services including inpatient, outpatient, medical, surgical and emergency care. Gateway Regional is home to the Bone & Joint Center, which provides joint replacement surgery and recovery. It is known for its behavioral health care, robotic-assisted surgery, as well as its cardiac care services.
