= St. Luke's Hospital Complex (Chicago) =

- U.S. National Register of Historic Places
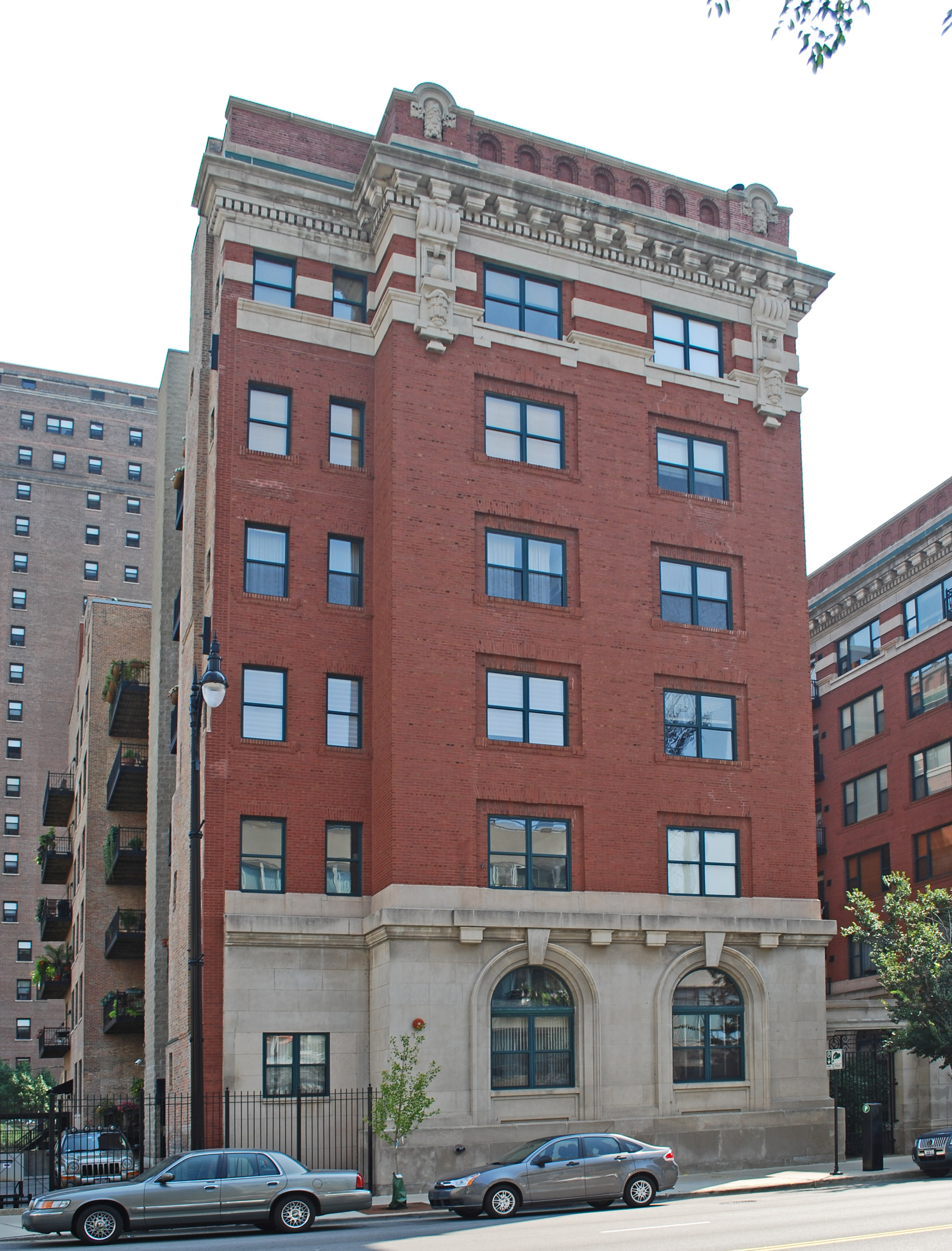

- Location within Chicago metropolitan area Location within Illinois Location within the United States
- Location: 1435 S. Michigan Ave., 1400 Block S. Indiana Ave., Chicago, Illinois
- Coordinates: 41°51′47″N 87°37′23″W
- Architect: Frost, Charles S.; Granger
- Architectural style: Renaissance, Gothic
- NRHP reference No.: 82000392
- Added to NRHP: November 24, 1982

St. Luke's Hospital, in Chicago, Illinois, is a former hospital. Its set of Gothic Revival style buildings, the St. Luke's Hospital Complex, was listed on the National Register of Historic Places in 1982.

The hospital eventually outgrew its original building, moved to a new location, and eventually became Rush University Medical Center, a major Chicago hospital.

== History ==
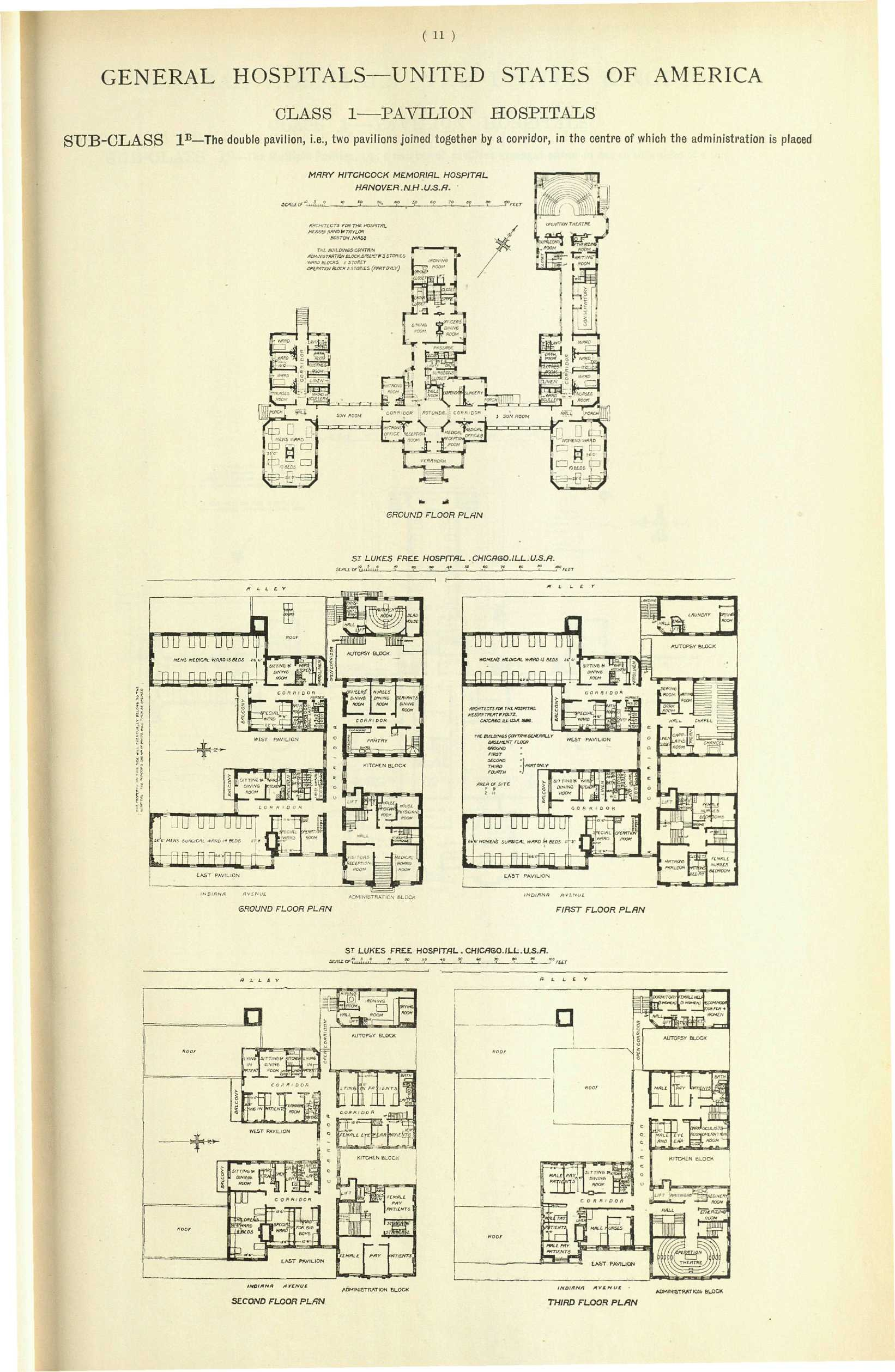
Overhead of the hospital complex

St. Luke's Hospital was founded in 1864. The St. Luke's Hospital School of Nursing was established in 1885. St. Luke's merged with Presbyterian Hospital to form Presbyterian-St. Luke's Hospital in 1956. Their nursing schools also united to create the Presbyterian-St. Luke's Hospital School of Nursing.

In 1969, Rush Medical College reactivated its charter and merged with Presbyterian-St. Luke's Hospital to form Rush-Presbyterian-St. Luke's Medical Center. Rush University, which now includes colleges of medicine, nursing, health sciences and research training, was established in 1972. The institution officially changed its name in September 2003 to Rush University Medical Center.

== Notable births ==
- Robin Williams was born in St. Luke's Hospital on July 21, 1951.
- Donald Rumsfeld
