= Centegra Health System =

- Company type: Hospital network
- Industry: Health care
- Founded: 1995
- Defunct: September 1, 2018
- Headquarters: United States
- Key people: Dean Harris, CEO; Michael Eesley, President
- Number of employees: 4,000 (2013)
- Website: centegra.org

Centegra Health System was a system of health care providers in McHenry County, Illinois, United States. It comprised three hospitals, two fitness centers, four immediate care centers, nearly a dozen physician care locations and numerous specialty care services. In 2013, the system had over 4,000 employees and 500 volunteers, and 460 physicians.

On September 1, 2018, Centegra was acquired by Northwestern Medicine of Chicago, Illinois. Prior to its acquisition, Centegra was the largest independent employer in McHenry County.

== History ==
=== 1910s-1980s ===
Centegra Health System was formed in 1995. In 1914, a group of physicians obtained a charter for a hospital in the home of Dr. Hyde West in Woodstock, Illinois. Woodstock Memorial Hospital was built on South Street. In 1956, Dr. Lee Gladstone built a clinic in McHenry, Illinois. The first and second floor included an emergency room, operating room, reception areas and offices for outpatient physician care. The ground floor had 22 beds. With rapid growth of population a new hospital was built in McHenry, Illinois and named Northern Illinois Medical Center.

=== 1990s ===
In the early 1990s, health planners in McHenry County consolidated efforts among the two hospitals and physicians in the area. In 1995, Centegra Health System was formed when a new building named Memorial Medical Center was built in Woodstock, Illinois. Centegra Health Bridge Fitness Center was also built in Crystal Lake, Illinois. Centegra Primary Care was formed in the late 1990s.

=== Huntley Health Campus ===
In 2008, the Centegra Health Campus in Huntley, Illinois was built, which included Centegra Physician Care, Centegra Immediate Care and Centegra Health Bridge Fitness Centers. In 2011, Centegra announced plans to build a hospital in Huntley on the Centegra Health Campus. This hospital was completed and opened in 2016.

== Hospitals ==
=== Centegra Hospital — Woodstock ===
Centegra Hospital — Woodstock, or Memorial Medical Center (MMC), was a 135-bed hospital. In September 2018, it became Northwestern Medicine Woodstock Hospital.

In 2015, a 40-bed Behavioral Health unit was opened within Centegra Hospital — Woodstock, and continues to operate under Northwestern Medicine.

=== Centegra Hospital — McHenry ===
Centegra Hospital — McHenry, or Northern Illinois Medical Center (NIMC) was a 173-bed hospital. McHenry County's Flight for Life emergency medical helicopter service was based here. In September 2018, it became Northwestern Medicine McHenry Hospital.

=== Centegra Hospital — Huntley ===
Centegra Hospital — Huntley was a 128-bed hospital built in 2016. In September 2018, it became Northwestern Medicine Huntley Hospital.

== Wellness Centers ==
Centegra Health Bridge Fitness Centers were located in Crystal Lake and Huntley. In 2018, they became Northwestern Medicine Health and Fitness Center Crystal Lake and Northwestern Medicine Health and Fitness Center Huntley.
