= OSF HealthCare =

American non-profit healthcare organization

- Type: Non-profit organization
- Industry: Healthcare
- Founded: 1877
- Founder: The Sisters of the Third Order of St. Francis
- Headquarters: Peoria, Illinois, USA
- Number of locations: 171
- Area served: Illinois, Michigan
- Key people: Michelle Conger, CEO; Sister Agnes Joseph Williams, O.S.F., Chairperson
- Revenue: $4.6 billion USD (2024)
- Total assets: 5,108,469,746 United States dollar (2022)
- Owner: The Sisters of the Third Order of St. Francis
- Number of employees: 25,246
- Subsidiaries: OSF Innovation; OSF HealthCare Foundation; OSF Ventures; Pointcore, Inc.
- Website: http://www.osfhealthcare.org/

OSF HealthCare is an integrated health system founded by The Sisters of the Third Order of St. Francis and headquartered in Peoria, Illinois.

== History ==
The Sisters of the Third Order of St. Francis were founded in Peoria on July 16, 1877, by Mother M. Frances Krasse, O.S.F., and Bishop John Lancaster Spalding.

Property was obtained in 1876 for St. Francis Hospital, which is the present day site of OSF HealthCare Saint Francis Medical Center in Peoria, lllinois.

Later that year, St. Joseph's Hospital in Bloomington, Illinois, was established, moving in 1968 to its present site, OSF HealthCare St. Joseph Medical Center.

In 1884, five sisters were sent to Escanaba, Michigan, to begin working at Delta County Hospital. In 1915, the Sisters purchased that hospital and renamed it Saint Francis Hospital.

By then, the Sisters were already operating St. Anthony Hospital, which they established in Rockford, Illinois, in 1899. The hospital in Rockford moved in 1963 to a new facility as present day OSF HealthCare Saint Anthony Medical Center.

=== 1900s ===
In 1905, the Sisters founded what is now Saint Francis Medical Center College of Nursing.

St. James Hospital was established in 1907 in Pontiac, Illinois, moving to a new facility in 2002 as present day OSF HealthCare Saint James-John W. Albrecht Medical Center.

St. Mary’s Hospital was established in 1909 in Galesburg, Illinois, and moved to a new facility in 1974, where it is today OSF HealthCare St. Mary Medical Center.

OSF Home Care, was established in 1983.

In 1990, OSF HealthCare Children’s Hospital of Illinois was established within OSF Saint Francis Medical Center as a pediatric hospital.

OSF Medical Group was started in 1994.

=== 2000s ===
In 2007, OSF HealthCare Holy Family Medical Center merged with OSF in Monmouth, Illinois.

In 2008, the OSF HealthCare Illinois Neurological Institute was organized to provide professional services of neurosurgeons and other physicians specializing in neurosciences.

=== 2010s ===
In 2012, Ottawa Regional Medical Center was integrated with OSF HealthCare, changing its name to OSF HealthCare Saint Elizabeth Medical Center.

In 2013, Jump Trading Simulation & Education Center was established in partnership with the University of Illinois College of Medicine Peoria.

In 2014, Kewanee Hospital joined OSF HealthCare as OSF HealthCare Saint Luke Medical Center That same year, what is now known as OSF HealthCare Saint Anthony’s Health Center in Alton merged with OSF.

In 2015, Mendota Community Hospital integrated with OSF HealthCare and became OSF HealthCare Saint Paul Medical Center.

In 2018, OSF HealthCare Sacred Heart Medical Center in Danville and OSF HealthCare Heart of Mary Medical Center in Urbana joined the OSF Family.

=== 2020s ===
In 2020, the Sisters expanded to the Chicago area with OSF HealthCare Little Company of Mary Medical Center in Evergreen Park.

In 2021, Princeton’s Perry Memorial Hospital became a part of OSF HealthCare, now known as OSF HealthCare Saint Clare Medical Center.

OSF HealthCare Divine Mercy Continuing Care Hospital, a long-term rehabilitation hospital, became wholly owned by OSF HealthCare in October 2023.

OSF HealthCare Saint Katharine Medical Center in Dixon, Illinois became the 17th hospital in the Ministry on January 1, 2025.

== Operations ==
Headquartered in Peoria, Illinois, OSF HealthCare employs almost 26,000 Mission Partners in 171 locations, including 17 hospitals, with 2,305 licensed beds, 200 OSF Medical Group primary care and specialty care clinics, 41 urgent care locations, and two colleges of nursing throughout Illinois and Michigan.

The OSF HealthCare physician network employs more than 2,215 primary care, specialist and advanced practice providers.

The largest hospital, OSF Saint Francis Medical Center in Peoria, Illinois, is a tertiary care teaching center. Additionally, OSF Children’s Hospital of Illinois is the third largest pediatric hospital in Illinois. It ended it's 26 year partnership with St. Jude Children's Research Hospital in 2026.

It also owns Pointcore, Inc., composed of health care-related businesses; OSF HealthCare Foundation, the philanthropic arm for the organization.

OSF HealthCare Headquarters is located in Downtown Peoria and is home to Ministry Services, which provides corporate management services, as well as direction, consultation and assistance to the administration of the Ministry’s health care facilities.

== Hospitals ==
Facility	Location	Licensed Beds
OSF HealthCare Sacred Heart Medical Center – Urbana	Urbana, IL	210
OSF HealthCare Holy Family Medical Center	Monmouth, IL	23
OSF HealthCare Little Company of Mary Medical Center	Evergreen Park, IL	274
OSF HealthCare Saint Clare Medical Center	Princeton, IL	25
OSF HealthCare Sacred Heart Medical Center	Danville, IL	174
OSF HealthCare Saint Anthony Medical Center	Rockford, IL	241
OSF HealthCare Saint Anthony's Health Center	Alton, IL	49
OSF HealthCare Saint Elizabeth Medical Center - Ottawa	Ottawa, IL	99
OSF HealthCare St. Francis Hospital & Medical Group	Escanaba, MI	25
OSF HealthCare Saint Francis Medical Center	Peoria, IL	642
OSF HealthCare Saint James - John W. Albrecht Medical Center	Pontiac, IL	42
OSF HealthCare St. Joseph Medical Center	Bloomington, IL	177
OSF HealthCare Saint Luke Medical Center	Kewanee, IL	25
OSF HealthCare St. Mary Medical Center	Galesburg, IL	83
OSF HealthCare Saint Paul Medical Center	Mendota, IL	25
OSF HealthCare Saint Elizabeth Medical Center - Peru	Peru, IL	64
OSF Health Care Saint Katharine Medical Center	Dixon, IL	80
OSF HealthCare Divine Mercy Continuing Care Hospital	Peoria, IL	47
