= Advocate Illinois Masonic Medical Center =

- Advocate Aurora Health

Geography
- Location: 836 West Wellington Avenue, Lake View, Chicago, Illinois, United States
- Coordinates: 41°56′12.5″N 87°39′04.6″W

Organization
- Type: Teaching, research, & referral
- Affiliated university: University of Illinois College of Medicine; Chicago Medical School; Chicago College of Osteopathic Medicine
- Patron: Masons of Illinois

Services
- Emergency department: Level I trauma center
- Beds: 408 or 551

History
- Founded: 1897

Links
- Website: www.advocatehealth.com/immc/
- Lists: Hospitals in Illinois

Advocate Illinois Masonic Medical Center is a 551-bed non-profit teaching hospital located in Chicago. Founded in 1897, the hospital operates a Level I trauma center and Level III Perinatal Center. Its license number is 0005165. The hospital is a part of Advocate Aurora Health. Each year, the hospital provides services for 18,000 inpatients, more than 152,000 outpatients and 41,000 emergency patients. Approximately 300 physicians are trained each year through its affiliations with the University of Illinois College of Medicine, the Chicago Medical School and the Chicago College of Osteopathic Medicine."

== History ==
Advocate Illinois Masonic Medical Center was founded in 1901 by the Belden Avenue Baptist Church (founded 1897) Steadfast Sunday School class (2309 N. Halsted Street) as the Chicago Union Hospital. Originally a two-and-one-half story frame building which was rented for $50 a month, it contained 30 beds, 10 used by nurses, house physicians and staff, and 20 by patients, 5 of whom could afford to pay for their hospitalization. On March 3, 1905, the main building was destroyed by fire when a blaze broke out in the laboratory. In 1909 a new hospital building opened, which was equipped with an x-ray machine. In 1910, Martha A. Pippereit was superintendent.

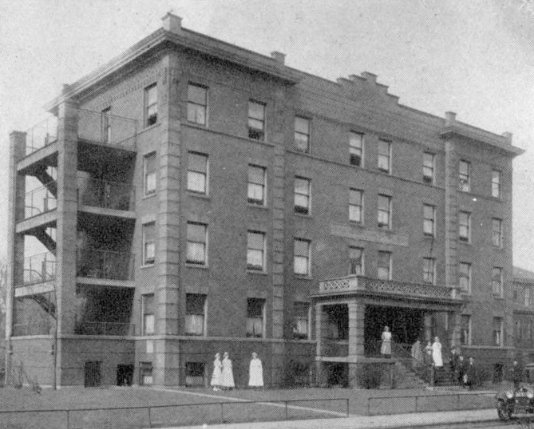
Illinois Masonic Hospital in 1922

When the operation outstripped the church group's ability, leaders of the hospital turned to the Masonic Order, who were planning to develop a hospital to provide care for their own. In 1921, the Masonic Order purchased the Union Hospital and renamed it Illinois Masonic Hospital. In 1921, the Illinois Masonic Hospital Association purchased Chicago Union Hospital for $100,000. By the end of the 1930s, the hospital had more than 150 beds.

In November 2000, Illinois Masonic Medical Center became a hospital member of Advocate Health Care. In 2002, the hospital suffered losses of $18 million due to reductions in federal and state government payments to providers of medical care.

On April 27, 2015, a new $100 million Center for Advanced Care at Advocate Illinois Masonic Medical Center was opened. The 164,000-square-foot, three-story facility was designed by SmithGroup. The new building, attached to the main hospital, allowed Advocate Illinois Masonic Medical Center to expand and centralize three medical specialties—cancer care, digestive health and outpatient surgery services—in a single, integrated platform.

== Graduate medical education ==
Advocate Illinois Masonic Medical Center operates a number of residency training and fellowship programs for newly graduated physicians. The residencies train physicians specializing in anesthesiology, family medicine, internal medicine, obstetrics and gynecology, and radiology. Fellowships provide training for physicians specializing in cardiology and cardiac electrophysiology. All programs are accredited by the Accreditation Council for Graduate Medical Education (ACGME). Each year, Advocate Illinois Masonic Medical Center trains 300+ physicians.

The hospital also provides graduate training in pharmacy, dentistry and podiatry. The pharmacy residency is accredited by the American Society of Health-System Pharmacists.

== Advocate Health Care ==
Advocate Illinois Masonic Medical Center is part of Downers Grove-based Advocate Health Care, which is the largest health care provider in Illinois and the largest accountable care organization in the US. With more than 25,000 employees and 4,600 affiliated physicians, Advocate Health Care operates 10 acute care hospitals, including two children's hospitals and a specialty hospital for extended care needs, three large medical groups, and comprehensive home health and hospice services. Advocate Health Care is a not-for-profit, faith-based organization related to both the Evangelical Lutheran Church in America and the United Church of Christ.

== See also ==
- Advocate Christ Medical Center
- Advocate Lutheran General Hospital
- Masonic Children's Hospital
- Shriners Hospitals for Children
- Royal Masonic Hospital
