= A. Jamil Tajik =

Pakistani American physician

- Born: Abdul Jamil Tajik
- Education: King Edward Medical College; Mayo Clinic Graduate School of Medicine
- Occupations: Physician, medical researcher
- Known for: Research in cardiovascular diseases and echocardiography

Abdul Jamil Tajik is a Pakistani American physician and medical investigator in the field of cardiovascular diseases. In 2011, he was listed by the Institute for Scientific Information as a highly cited researcher, one of the top 250 researchers in his field in terms of number of citations. Since 2010, he has worked in the Aurora Health Care system.

== Education ==
Tajik received his medical degree from King Edward Medical College in Lahore, Pakistan in 1965 and completed his Residency and Fellowship in Cardiology at the Mayo Graduate School of Medicine.

== Career ==
In 1972, Tajik was appointed as a consultant in Cardiovascular Diseases at Mayo Clinic. Between 1980 and 1992, he served as the Director of the Echocardiography Laboratory, and, from 1993 to 2002, he was Chairman of the Cardiovascular Division. In 2010, he joined Aurora Health Care. He was later President of Cardiovascular Services at Aurora St. Luke's Medical Center. In addition to clinical work, Tajik teaches at Mayo's cardiovascular center and has won multiple teaching and mentorship awards. His research focuses include adult congenital heart disease, hypertrophic cardiomyopathy, valvular heart disease, Marfan syndrome, aortopathies, pericardial disorders, and diastolic heart failure. He has written more than 600 articles and book chapters, and has co-authored seven books.

He is a member of the American Heart Association (AHA), American College of Cardiology (ACC), American Society of Electrocardiography (ASE), International Society of Cardiovascular Ultrasound, and Heart Valve Society of America. He served as the Chairman of Electrocardiography Committees for both the AHA and ACC, and was the Chairman of the ACC's International Committee from 2001 to 2006. He is also on the editorial boards of several cardiology journals. He holds several U.S. patents on ultrasound catheter-based technology. In 2020, he was the driving force behind a countywide preventative cardiology project called Cardiovision 2020 in Olmsted County, Maryland.

An annual Tajik-Seward Echo Lectureship was established in 2006 by Mayo colleagues, and the annual A. Jamil Tajik Young Investigator Award was started by the Japanese Society of Echocardiography in 2008. He has been director/co-director of cardiology courses both in the United States and abroad, including the ACC's Heart House and 50 American College of Cardiology/American Society of Echo extramural courses. He also hosted the tele-education program Cardiology Today and Tomorrow in the 1990s.

== Awards ==
- 1996: Medal of Excellence - Hashemite Kingdom of Jordan
- 2000: Distinguished Alumnus Award - King Edward Medical College Alumni Association
- 2000: Melvin L. Marcus Memorial Award
- 2001: Medal of Merit in 2001 - International Society for Heart Research
- 2003: Distinguished Fellow - American College of Cardiology
- 2003: Echo Pioneer Award
- 2003: Honorary Fellow - Hungarian Cardiac Society
- 2005: Honorary Fellow - Italian Cardiac Societies
- 2005: Honorary Fellow - Mexican Cardiac Society
- 2005: Ellis Island Medal of Honor
- 2005: Fellow - International Academy of Cardiovascular Sciences
- 2005: Outstanding Mentorship Award - Mayo Clinic Department of Medicine
- 2008: Honorary Fellow - Japanese College of Cardiology
- 2009: Lifetime Achievement Award - American Society of Echo
