= List of acts of the Parliament of Victoria from 1977 =

This is a list of acts of the Parliament of Victoria, Australia for the year 1977.

== 1977 ==
Short title, or popular name	Citation	Royal assent
Long title
Fuel Emergency Act 1977	No. 8976	3 May 1972
An Act to make Provision with respect to the Production, Supply, Distribution, Sale, Use and Consumption of Fuel during a State of Emergency, to amend the Essential Services Act 1958 (Note: Essential Services Act 1958 (No. 6244)) and for other purposes.
Melbourne Underground Rail Loop (Amendment) Act 1977	No. 8981	3 May 1977
An Act to authorize the Melbourne Underground Rail Loop Authority to acquire certain Land in the City of Melbourne, to make provision with respect to the Development of such Land, to amend the Melbourne Underground Rail Loop Act 1970 (Note: Melbourne Underground Rail Loop Act 1970 (No. 8023)) and for other purposes.
Epworth Hospital (Guarantee) Act 1977	No. 8986	3 May 1977
An Act to authorize the Treasurer of Victoria to guarantee Repayment of certain Moneys proposed to be borrowed by the Methodist Church (Victoria) Property Trust and for other purposes.
Melbourne and Metropolitan Tramways (Borrowing Powers) Act 1977	No. 8992	10 May 1977
An Act to amend Section 28 of the Melbourne and Metropolitan Tramways Act 1958. (Note: Melbourne and Metropolitan Tramways Act 1958 (No. 6311))
Melbourne Wholesale Fruit and Vegetable Market Trust Act 1977	No. 8993	10 May 1977
An Act to establish the Melbourne Wholesale Fruit and Vegetable Market Trust, to give effect to the Transfer of the Melbourne Wholesale Fruit and Vegetable Market to that Trust, to repeal the Melbourne Wholesale Fruit and Vegetable Market Act 1968, (Note: Melbourne Wholesale Fruit and Vegetable Market Act 1968 (No. 7760)) to amend the Road Traffic Act 1958, (Note: Road Traffic Act 1958 (No. 6359)) the Farm Produce Merchants and Commission Agents Act 1965, (Note: Farm Produce Merchants and Commission Agents Act 1965 (No. 7274)) the Land Tax Act 1958 (Note: Land Tax Act 1958 (No. 6289)) and the Local Authorities Superannuation Act 1958, (Note: Local Authorities Superannuation Act 1958 (No. 6298)) and for other purposes.
Melbourne and Geelong Corporations (Regent Theatre Buildings) Act 1977	No. 8999	10 May 1877
An Act to enable the Council of the City of Melbourne to utilize Moneys from the Town Fund and to borrow Moneys for the Restoration of the Regent Theatre and Other Adjoining Buildings, and for other purposes.
Victorian Dairy Industry Authority Act 1977	No. 9004	10 May 1977
An Act to establish the Victorian Dairy Industry Authority, to amend the Milk Board Act 1958, (Note: Milk Board Act 1958 (No. 6318)) and for other purposes.
Bail Act 1977	No. 9008	10 May 1977
An Act to make better Provision relating to Bail and to amend the Children's Court Act 1973, (Note: Children's Court Act 1973 (No. 8477)) the Coroners Act 1958, (Note: Coroners Act 1958 (No. 6227)) the Crimes Act 1958, (Note: Crimes Act 1958 (No. 6231)) the Crown Proceedings Act 1958, (Note: Crown Proceedings Act 1958 (No. 6232)) the Summary Offences Act 1966, (Note: Summary Offences Act 1966 (No. 7405)) the Magistrates (Summary Proceedings) Act 1975, (Note: Magistrates (Summary Proceedings) Act 1975 (No. 8731)) and the Rape Offences (Proceedings) Act 1976. (Note: Rape Offences (Proceedings) Act 1976 (No. 8950))
Superannuation Benefits Act 1977 (repealed)	No. 9017	17 May 1977
An Act to make Provision with respect to the Entitlement of Members of certain Statutory Superannuation Schemes to Deferred Retirement Benefits and for other purposes. (Repealed by Superannuation (Portability) Act 1989 (No. 14 of 1989))
Emerald Tourist Railway Act 1977	No. 9020	17 May 1977
An Act to make Provision for the Establishment of a Board to be known as the Emerald Tourist Railway Board for the Preservation and Operation as a Tourist Attraction of the Historical Narrow-gauge Steam Railway in the Dandenong Ranges and for Purposes connected therewith.
Uniting Church in Australia Act 1977	No. 9021	17 May 1977
An Act to provide for the Inauguration of The Uniting Church in Australia, to constitute The Uniting Church in Australia Property Trust (Victoria) and to define its powers, authorities, duties and functions, to provide for the vesting of certain Property in The Uniting Church in Australia Property Trust (Victoria) and for other purposes.
Health Commission Act 1977	No. 9023	24 May 1977
An Act to establish the Health Commission of Victoria, to amend the Health Act 1958, (Note: Health Act 1958 (No. 6270)) the Hospitals and Charities Act 1958, (Note: Hospitals and Charities Act 1958 (No. 6274)) the Mental Health Act 1959, (Note: Mental Health Act 1959 (No. 6605)) the Cancer Act 1958 (Note: Cancer Act 1958 (No. 6213)) and other Acts, and for other purposes.
Geelong Regional Commission Act 1977	No. 9024	24 May 1977
An Act to make Provision with respect to the Planning and Development of the Geelong Area, the Constitution of the Geelong Regional Commission and for other purposes.
Equal Opportunity Act 1977	No. 9025	24 May 1977
An Act to render unlawful certain Kinds of Discrimination on the Ground of Sex or Marital Status, to promote Equality of Opportunity between Men and Women, to make Consequential Amendments to certain Acts and for other purposes.
Melbourne and Metropolitan Board of Works (Borrowing Powers) Act 1977	No. 9030	18 October 1977
An Act to increase the maximum amount which the Melbourne and Metropolitan Board of Works may borrow and for other purposes.
Epworth Hospital (Guarantee) (Amendment) Act 1977	No. 9034	2 November 1977
An Act to amend the Epworth Hospital (Guarantee) Act 1977 (Note: Epworth Hospital (Guarantee) Act 1977 (No. 8986)) and for other purposes.
Melbourne and Metropolitan Board of Works (Powers) Act 1977	No. 9037	22 November 1977
An Act to make Provision with respect to certain Powers of the Melbourne and Metropolitan Board of Works and for other purposes.
Administration and Probate (Amendment) Act 1977	No. 9041	22 November 1977
An Act to amend the Administration and Probate Act 1958 (Note: Administration and Probate Act 1958 (No. 6191)) and for other purposes.
Pay-roll Tax Act 1977	No. 9055	29 November 1977
An Act to alter the General Exemption from Liability to Pay-roll Tax, to amend the Pay-roll Tax Act 1971 (Note: Pay-roll Tax Act 1971 (No. 8154)) and for other purposes.
Statute Law Revision Act 1977	No. 9059	29 November 1977
An Act to revise the Statute Law.
Age of Majority Act 1977	No. 9075	6 December 1977
An Act to lower the Age of Majority, to confer upon Persons who have attained the Age of eighteen Years the juristic Competence and Capacity of full Age, to make certain consequential Amendments to various Acts, and for other purposes.
Litter Act 1977 (repealed)	No. 9080	6 December 1977
An Act to amend the Litter Act 1964 (Note: Litter Act 1964 (No. 7145)) and for other purposes. (Repealed by Statute Law Revision (Repeals) Act 1999 (No. 3 of 1999))
Victorian Government Travel Authority Act 1977 (repealed)	No. 9083	6 December 1977
An Act to establish a Victorian Government Travel Authority, to amend the State Development Act 1970, and for other purposes. (Repealed by Victorian Tourism Commission Act 1982 (No. 9834))
Agricultural Authorities (Members Insurance) Act 1977	No.	
Anglican Church of Australia Constitution (Amendment) Act 1977	No.	
Appropriation (1977-78, No. 1) Act 1977	No.	
Australia and New Zealand Banking Group Act 1977	No.	
Building Industry Long Service Leave (Amendment) Act 1977	No.	
Cattle Compensation (Amendment) Act 1977	No.	
Cemeteries (Amendment) Act 1977	No.	
Change of Ownership Notices Act 1977	No.	
Co-operative Housing Societies (Leasehold Securities) Act 1977	No.	
Commissioners and Justices Act 1977	No.	
Committees (Attendance Fees) Act 1977	No.	
Constitution Act 1977	No.	
Consumer Affairs (Amendment) Act 1977	No.	
County Court (Amendment) Act 1977	No.	
Crimes (Armed Robbery) Act 1977	No.	
Crimes (Married Persons' Liability) Act 1977	No.	
Crown Reservations (Revocation and Excision) Act 1977	No.	
Dandenong Valley Authority (Cardinia Creek) Act 1977	No.	
Dental Technicians (Amendment) Act 1977	No.	
Educational Grants (Continuation) Act 1977	No.	
Egg Industry Stabilization (Amendment) Act 1977	No.	
Essential Services (Right to Work) Act 1977	No.	
Geelong (Kardinia Park) Land Act 1977	No.	
Geelong Grammar Schools Amalgamations Act 1977	No.	
Geelong Waterworks and Sewerage (Amendment) Act 1977	No.	
Gift Duty (Amendment) Act 1977	No.	
Grain Elevators (Amendment) Act 1977	No.	
Health (Amendment) Act 1977	No.	
Hospitals Superannuation (Amendment) Act 1977	No.	
Judges Salaries Act 1977	No.	
La Trobe University (Amendment) Act 1977	No.	
Labour and Industry (Industrial Appeals Court) Act 1977	No.	
Labour and Industry Act 1977	No.	
Land (Lands Surrender) Act 1977	No.	
Land (Surrender of Lands) Act 1977	No.	
Land Surveyors (Surveyors Board) Act 1977	No.	
Land Tax Act 1977	No.	
Local Authorities Superannuation (Contributions) Act 1977	No.	
Local Government (Amendment) Act 1977	No.	
Local Government (Promotion of Decentralization) Act 1977	No.	
Local Government (Rate Relief) Act 1977	No.	
Lotteries Gaming and Betting (Raffles and Bingo) Act 1977	No.	
Macleod Land Act 1977	No.	
Magistrates' Courts (Commitment) Act 1977	No.	
Marine (Pilots Superannuation) Act 1977	No.	
Marriage (Amendment) Act 1977	No.	
Melton Land Act 1977	No.	
Mildura College Lands (Mildura Schools Fund) Act 1977	No.	
Milk Board (Milk Vendors) Act 1977	No.	
Motor Car (Amendment) Act 1977	No.	
Motor Car (Breath Testing Stations) (Amendment) Act 1977	No.	
Oakleigh Lands (Bowling Club Lands) Act 1977	No.	
Police Offences (Child Pornography) Act 1977	No.	
Police Regulation (Amendment) Act 1977	No.	
Portland Harbor Trust (Financial) Act 1977	No.	
Probate Duty Act 1977	No.	
Property Law (Deeds) Act 1977	No.	
Public Account (Amendment) Act 1977	No.	
Public Contracts (Amendment) Act 1977	No.	
Public Service (Director-General of Agriculture) Act 1977	No.	
Public Service (Government Offices) Act 1977	No.	
Public Works and Services Act 1977	No.	
Racing (Amendment) Act 1977	No.	
Racing (Fees) Act 1977	No.	
Racing (Mixed Sports Gatherings) Act 1977	No.	
Racing (Tabella Totalizators) Act 1977	No.	
Railways (Participation in Pipelines) Act 1977	No.	
Revocation and Excision of Crown Reservations Act 1977	No.	
Rural Finance and Settlement Commission (Amendment) Act 1977 (repealed)	No. 9072	
(Repealed by Statute Law (Further Revision) Act 2006 (No. 29 of 2006))
Shepparton Abattoirs (Amendment) Act 1977	No.	
Small Claims Tribunals (Amendment) Act 1977	No.	
Social Welfare (Administration) Act 1977	No.	
Social Welfare (Homeless Persons) Act 1977	No.	
Stamps (Amendment) Act 1977	No.	
State Electricity Commission (Financial Accommodation) Act 1977	No.	
State Electricity Commission (Newport Power Station) Act 1977 (repealed)	No. 9011	
(Repealed by Treasury Legislation (Repeal) Act 2005 (No. 73 of 2005))
State Forests Works and Services Act 1977	No.	
State Library and National Museum Buildings Committee Act 1977	No.	
Superannuation (Amendment) Act 1977	No.	
Supply (1977-78, No. 1) Act 1977	No.	
Tattersall Consultations (Gold Lottery Consultations) Act 1977	No.	
Taxation Appeals (Fees) Act 1977	No.	
Transport Regulation (Amendment) Act 1977	No.	
Transport Works and Services Act 1977	No.	
Victorian Institute of Marine Sciences (Council) Act 1977	No.	
Water Supply Works and Services Act 1977 (repealed)	No. 9053	
(Repealed by Treasury Legislation (Repeal) Act 2005 (No. 73 of 2005))
Wills (Interested Witnesses) Act 1977	No.	
Wycheproof Land Act 1977	No.	
Yooralla Society of Victoria Act 1977	No.	
Youth, Sport and Recreation (State Recreation Council) Act 1977	No.	
Zoological Parks and Gardens (Borrowing Powers) Act 1977	No.	

== Sources ==
- "1977 Victorian Historical Acts". AustLII.
