= Stasilon =

Textile brand

Stasilon is a brand-name hemostatic woven textile manufactured by Entegrion, Inc. of Durham, North Carolina, USA. It is made from fibers of continuous filament fiberglass and bamboo yarn and is used to accelerate clotting and stop bleeding from cuts and abrasions. Originally intended for military use, NATO and United States Navy reviews have reported its abilities to be unsuited to life-threatening arterial hemorrhaging; however, Stasilon has found use in burn victim treatment settings.

Entegrion received Food and Drug Administration approval to market its fabric in 2007.
