= Epworth Freemasons =

Coordinates: 37°48′34″S 144°58′56″E

- Epworth HealthCare
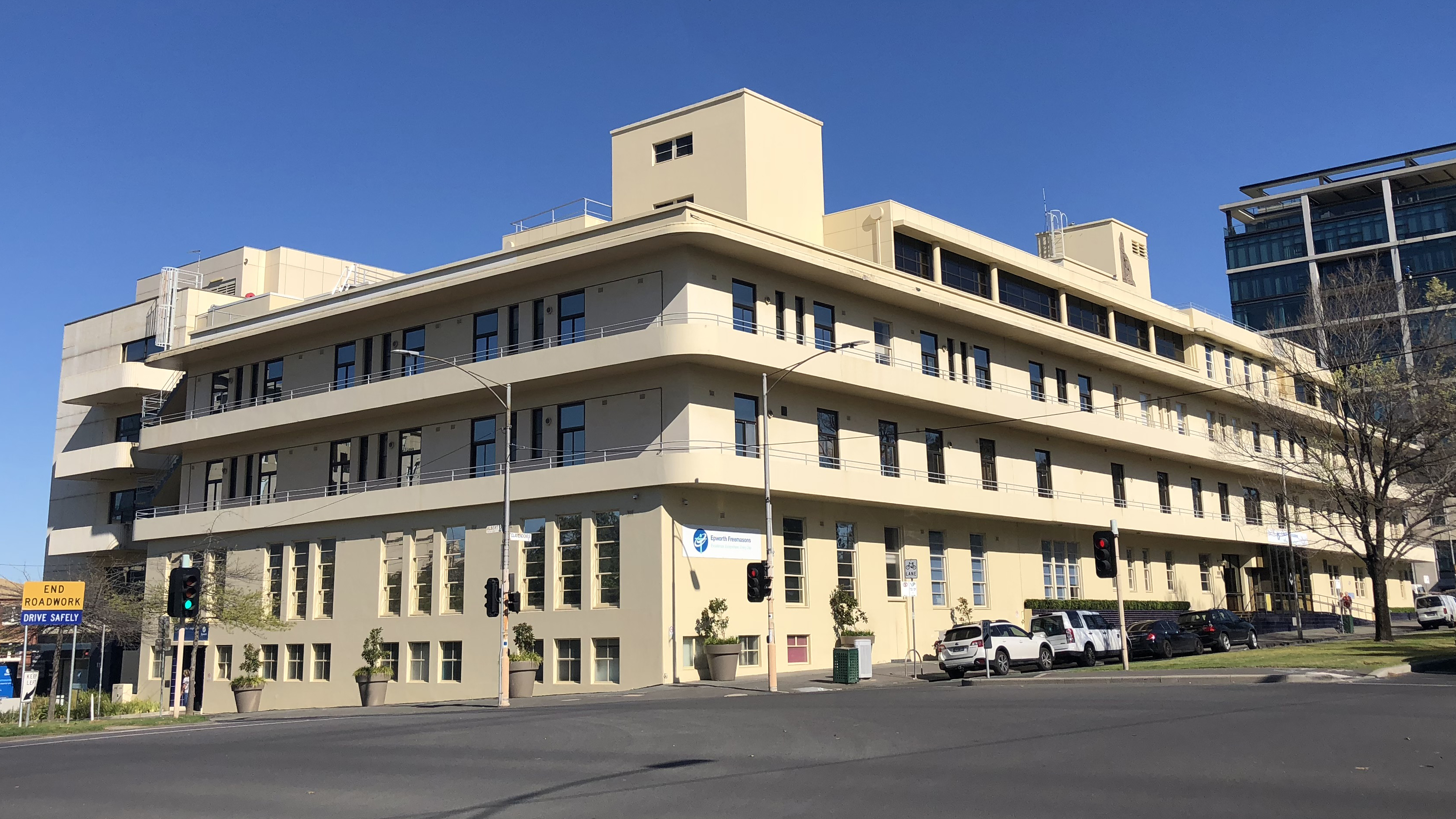
- Epworth Freemasons (Albert Street)

Geography
- Location: 109 Albert Street, East Melbourne VIC 3002, Australia

Organisation
- Care system: Not-for-profit
- Affiliated university: The University of Melbourne, Monash University, Deakin University and La Trobe University

Services
- Beds: 234 inpatient, 9 delivery

History
- Founded: 1937

Links
- Website: www.epworth.org.au/Our-Hospitals/Epworth-Freemasons/Pages/Overview.aspx
- Lists: Hospitals in Australia

Established in 1937, Epworth Freemasons (formerly the Freemasons Hospital), located at 166 Clarendon St in East Melbourne, was a practical expression of the work of Freemasonry in the Victorian community. It is now run by Epworth Healthcare.

It is a non-government, not-for-profit, charitable institution providing a range of inpatient and ambulatory care services including: Women's and related health services including maternity, women's health and breast clinics, breast and gynaecological surgery and IVF. Surgical services including general surgery, urology, orthopaedics, plastic surgery, ophthalmology and ENT. Comprehensive cancer care covering diagnosis, surgical oncology, medical oncology, radiotherapy and chemotherapy.

In October 2006 the hospital was purchased by ING Real Estate, which immediately leased the hospital to Epworth Healthcare. One immediate effect was the merging of two emergency departments, the previous Freemason's Emergency was closed while Epworth Richmond's still operates.

The now Epworth Freemasons Hospital still operates as a hospital.

The site is listed on the Victorian Heritage Register.

== History ==
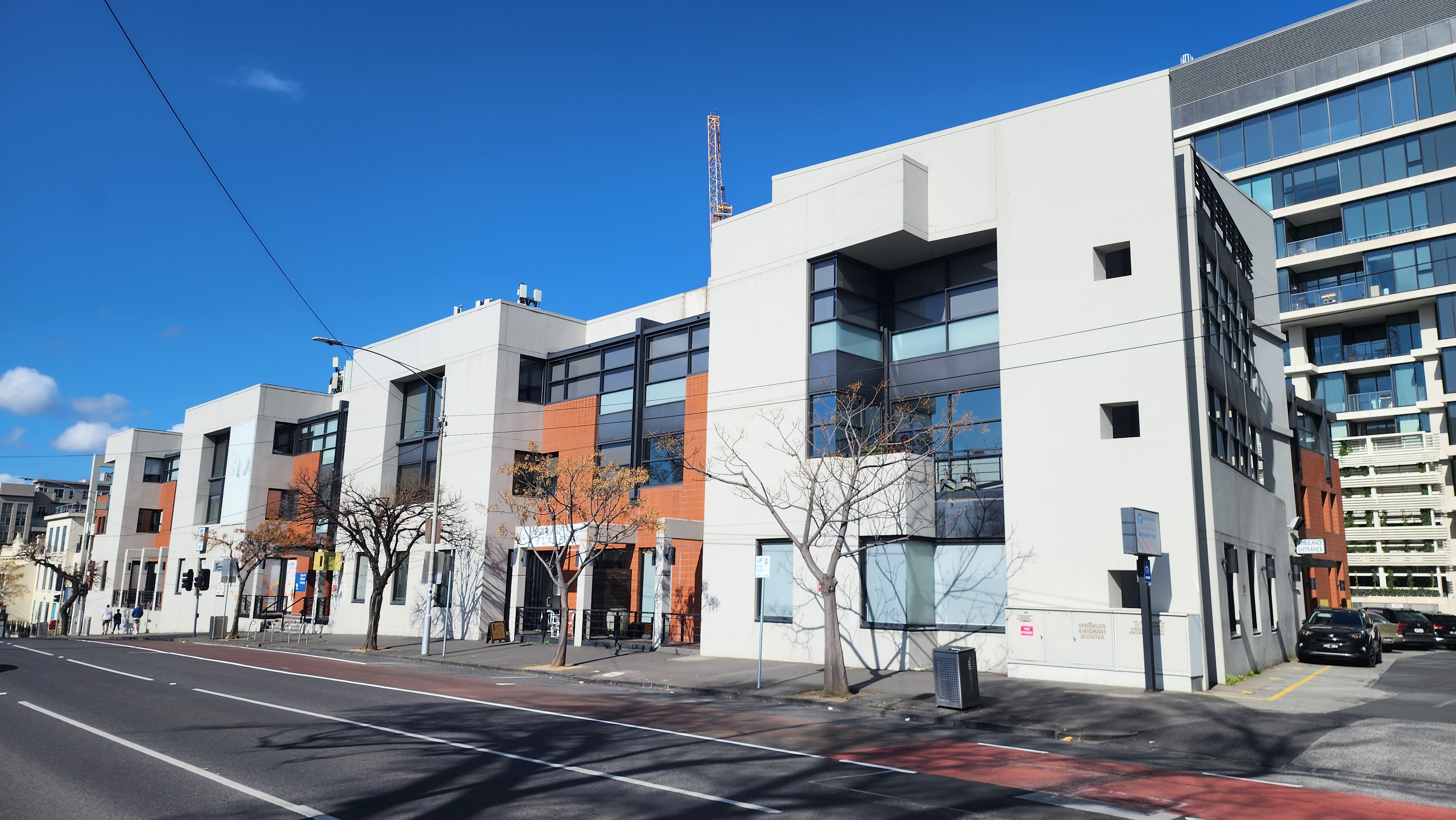
Epworth Freemasons, Victoria Parade

The Freemasons Hospital was established in 1937, as an initiative of Victoria's Freemasons in the 1930s to accommodate middle-class fee paying patients. The original five-level reinforced concrete building was designed by architects, Stephenson and Meldrum (later Stephenson and Turner), in a Functionalist Modern style with its bold horizontal balconies, contrasting vertical service tower and minimal decoration. The white rendered exterior was trimmed with blue tiles and horizontal tubular steel balustrades.

Between 1956 and 1958 the hospital was substantially extended by architects, Meldrum and Noad, to a design sympathetic to the original by continuing the sweeping balconies. Further wings to the east were added in 1968 and again in 1977 with the front entrance altered.

The hospital is of historical and architectural significance to the State of Victoria.

== Facilities ==
- 234 inpatient beds
- 9 Delivery Suites
- Day Procedure Centre
- Intensive Care Unit

== See also ==
- Epworth Healthcare
- Royal Masonic Hospital
- Masonic Children's Hospital
- Advocate Illinois Masonic Medical Center
