= Advocate Christ Medical Center =

- Advocate Aurora Health
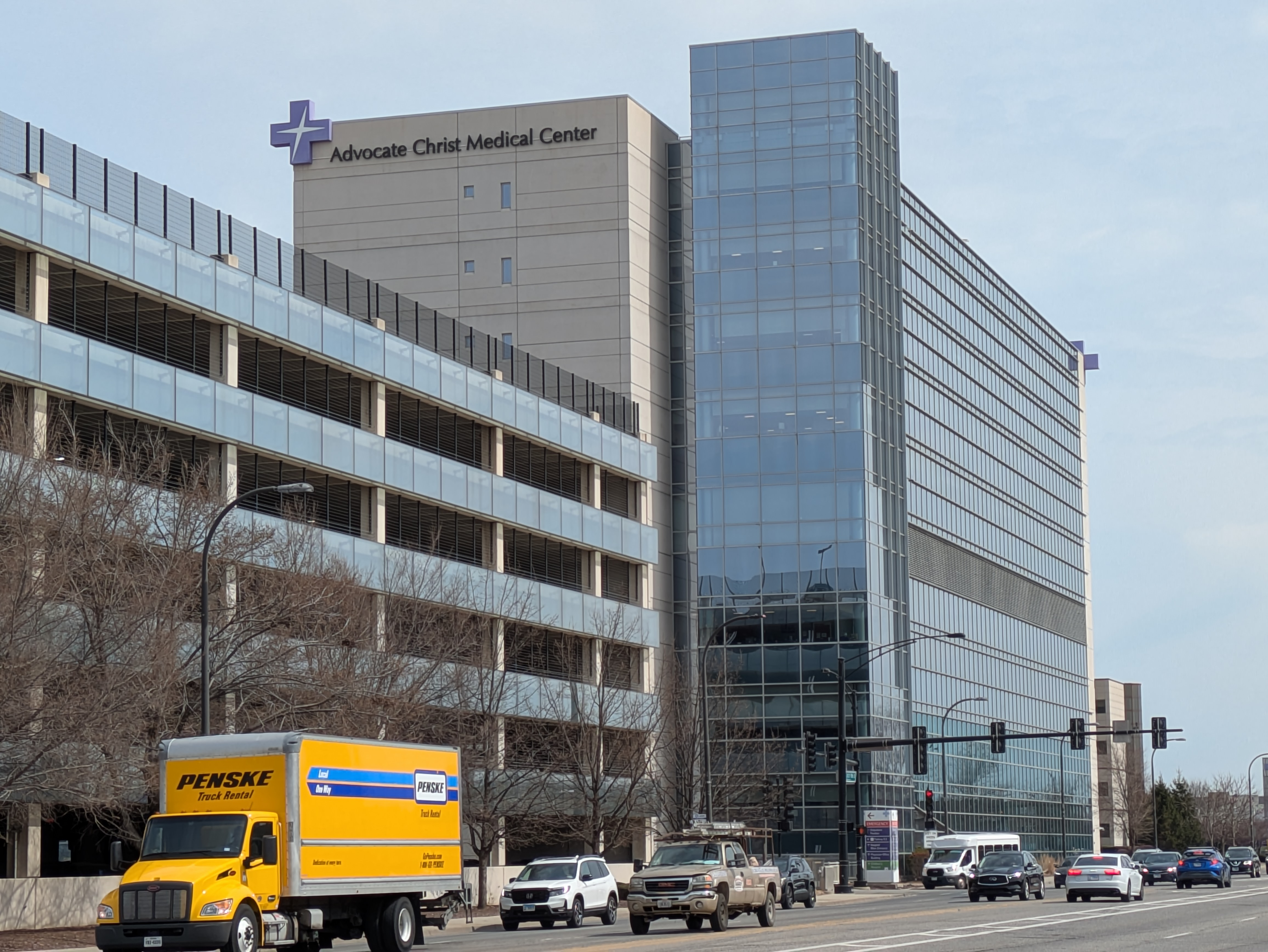
- Advocate Christ Medical Center seen from 95th Street

Geography
- Location: Oak Lawn, Illinois, United States
- Coordinates: 41.7212°N 87.7322°W

Organization
- Care system: Private
- Type: Teaching
- Affiliated university: University of Illinois Chicago

Services
- Emergency department: Level I trauma center
- Beds: 788

Helipads
- Helipad: FAA LID: IL77

History
- Former name: Christ Hospital
- Founded: 1960

Links
- Website: www.advocatehealth.com/cmc/
- Lists: Hospitals in Illinois

Advocate Christ Medical Center (ACMC) is a 788-bed teaching hospital located in Oak Lawn, Illinois, a suburb of Chicago. Founded in 1960, Advocate Christ Medical Center is a part of Advocate Aurora Health. In the most recent year with available data, the hospital had 40,517 admissions, 3,738 deliveries, 102,279 ED visits, 334,958 outpatient visits, and 24,745 surgeries. The emergency room includes a level 1 trauma center. The hospital operates a primary stroke center and a pulmonary rehabilitation center. ACMC operates a number of residency training and fellowship programs for newly graduated physicians, pharmacists and podiatrists. Each year, more than 400 residents, 600 medical students, and 800 nursing students train at the hospital. In 2016, ACMC opened a new eight story patient tower.

== History ==
The hospital was founded in 1960. Originally named "Christ Hospital," the hospital was renamed Advocate Christ Medical Center in 2001. In 2016, the hospital opened a new eight-story, 326,000-square-foot patient tower. In 2016, an emergency physician filed a lawsuit alleging the hospital wrongfully terminated his employment as retaliation for his reporting concerns that a colleague was sexually harassing female physicians in training (residents). The judge awarded the physician $1 million. In 2018, Advocate Healthcare merged with Wisconsin-based Aurora Health. In 2020, the hospital treated patients with COVID-19, as the COVID-19 pandemic developed. The hospital planned to test for COVID-19 and provide treatment at no immediate cost to patients.

== Services ==
The hospital operates a pulmonary rehabilitation center, and a primary stroke center. The hospital provides transplant services in cooperation with Gift of Hope, including organ procurement.

== Graduate medical education ==
Advocate Christ Medical Center operates a number of residency training and fellowship programs for newly graduated physicians. The residencies train physicians specializing in anesthesiology, emergency medicine, family medicine, general surgery, internal medicine, obstetrics/gynecology, orthopedics, and pediatrics. The internal medicine residency is affiliated with the University of Illinois College of Medicine. The hospital also operates a residency for podiatry and pharmacy graduates. Fellowship training is offered in cardiology (adult and pediatric), cardiac surgery, and breast oncology. Each year, more than 400 residents, 600 medical students, and 800 nursing students train at Advocate Christ Medical Center.

The hospital is accredited for Clinical Pastoral Education by the Council for Higher Education Accreditation.

== See also ==
- Advocate Lutheran General Hospital
- Advocate Sherman Hospital
