= Caustic pencil =

Medical device for chemical cautery

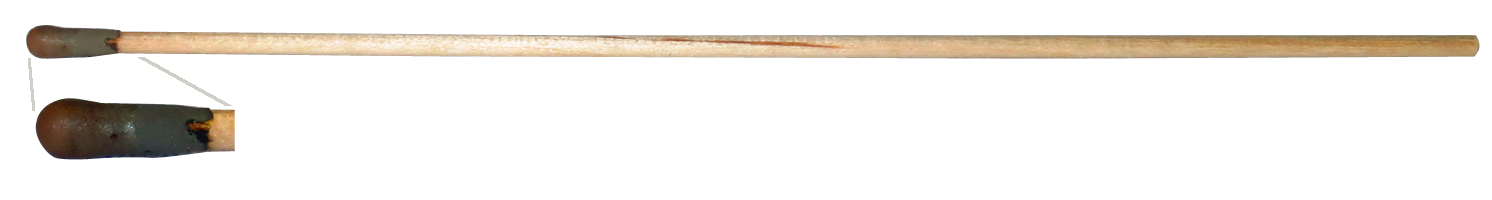
Typical caustic pencil with detail of dried, oxidized, and inactive chemical.

A caustic pencil (or silver nitrate stick) is a device for applying topical medication containing silver nitrate and potassium nitrate, used to chemically cauterize skin, providing hemostasis or permanently destroying unwanted tissue such as a wart, skin tag, aphthous ulcers, or over-production of granulation tissue. They are not used as a treatment for minor skin cuts, and are not to be confused with a styptic pencil.

The silver and potassium nitrates in caustic pencils is in a dried, solid form at the tip of a wooden or plastic stick. When the material is applied to a wound or lesion, the tissue moisture or blood dissolves the dried nitrate salts, which then chemically burn the tissue. It requires moisture for activation.

Silver nitrate sticks are often used for minor hemostasis where patients are not under general anesthesia, and where electrocautery would be painful and inconvenient. One common use of silver nitrate sticks is in emergency medicine, to control epistaxis (nosebleed). The stick is rolled on the affected mucous membrane or visible blood vessel in the nares (nostril) where the chemical cauterization stops the minor bleeding.

If the bleeding is too copious, the chemical cautery may not be effective, as the flowing blood can wash away the chemical before it can react with the tissue. It can also be accidentally spread to undesirable locations where it can cause skin staining and tissue burns. This is especially important, as it is often used in the nose where accidental aerosolization can occur, splattering the clinician or other parts of the patient and causing unintentional burns. Accidental application to unintended tissue is treated with copious water irrigation, and saline solution will inactivate the chemical reaction.
