= Antihemorrhagic =

Substance that stops bleeding

An antihemorrhagic (British English: antihaemorrhagic) agent is a substance that promotes hemostasis (a process which stops bleeding). It may also be known as a hemostatic (also spelled haemostatic) agent.

Antihemorrhagic agents used in medicine have various mechanisms of action:

- Systemic drugs work by inhibiting fibrinolysis or promoting coagulation.
- Locally acting hemostatic agents work by causing vasoconstriction or promoting platelet aggregation.

== Medical uses ==
Hemostatic agents are used during surgical procedures to achieve hemostasis and are categorized as hemostats, sealants and adhesives. They vary based on their mechanism of action, composition, ease of application, adherence to tissue, immunogenicity and cost. These agents permit rapid hemostasis, better visualization of the surgical area, shorter operative times, decreased requirement for transfusions, decreased wound healing time and overall improvement in patient recovery time.

== Types ==
=== Systemic ===
There are several classes of antihemorrhagic drugs used in medicine. These include antifibrinolytics, blood coagulation factors, fibrinogen, and vitamin K.

=== Local ===
Topical hemostatic agents have been gaining popularity for use in emergency bleeding control, especially in military medicine. They are available in three forms –as a granular powder poured on wounds, as a styptic pencil and embedded in a dressing.

==== Organic ====
===== Microfibrillar collagen =====
Microfibrillar collagen hemostat (MCH) is a topical agent composed of resorbable microfibrillar collagen. It attracts platelets and allows for the formation of a blood clot when it comes into contact with blood. Unlike the hemostatic clamp, no mechanical action is involved. The surgeon presses the MCH against a bleeding site, and the collagen attracts and helps with the clotting process to eventually stop bleeding.

The practical application for MCH is different from that of the hemostatic clamp.

===== Chitosan =====
Chitosan hemostats are topical agents composed of chitosan and its salts. Chitosan bonds with platelets and red blood cells to form a gel-like clot which seals a bleeding vessel. Unlike other hemostatic agents like kaolin, its action does not require the normal hemostatic pathway and therefore continues to function even when anticoagulants like heparin are present in the patient's body, or when the patient's hemostatic ability is impaired due to the patient being hypothermic or hypovolemic.

Chitosan is used in some emergency hemostats which are designed to stop traumatic life-threatening bleeding. Their use is well established in many military and trauma units.

==== Inorganic ====
===== Contact activation =====
Kaolin activates the coagulation cascade, and has been used as the active component of hemostatic dressings (for example, in QuikClot).

===== Styptics =====
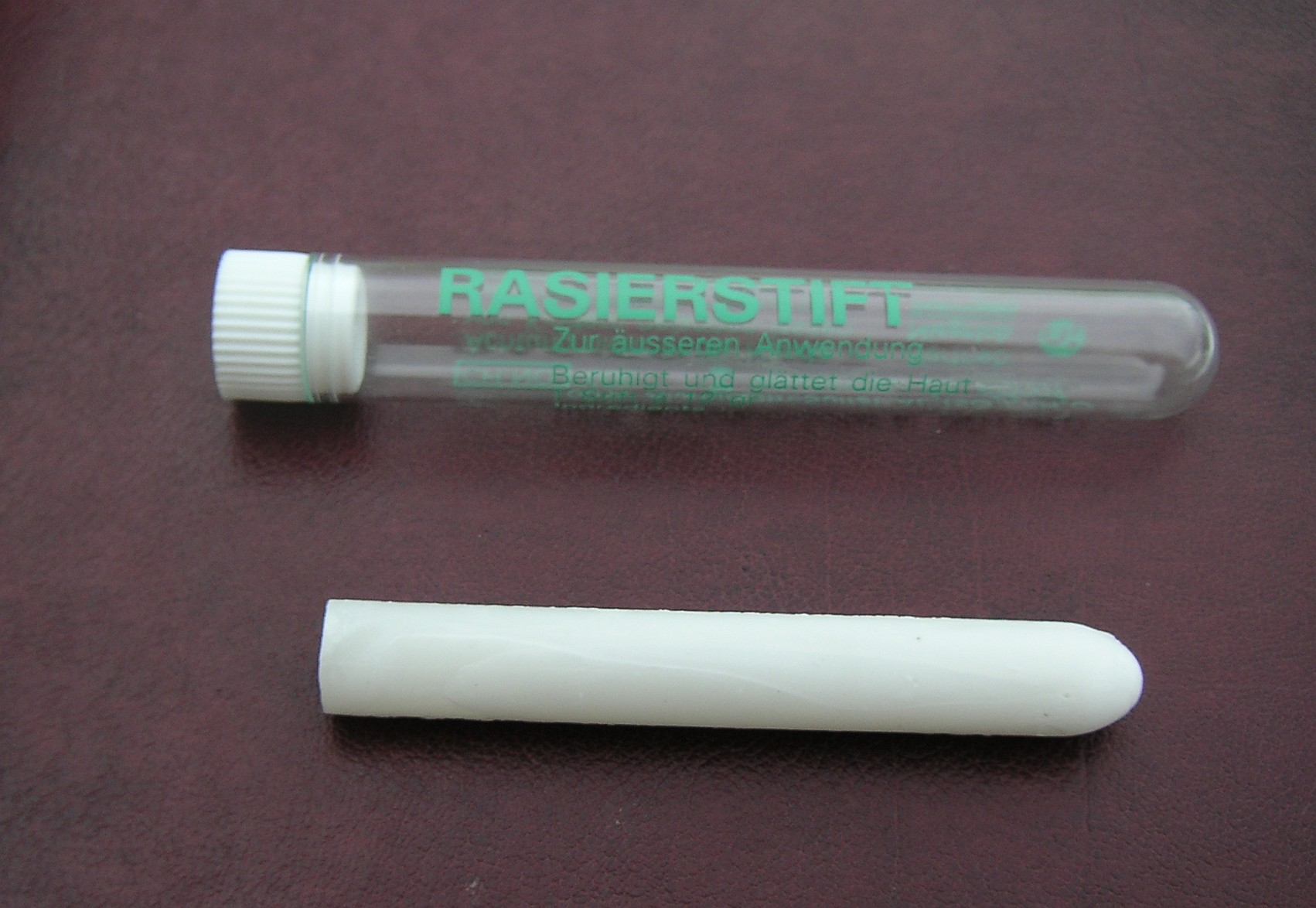
Styptic pencil

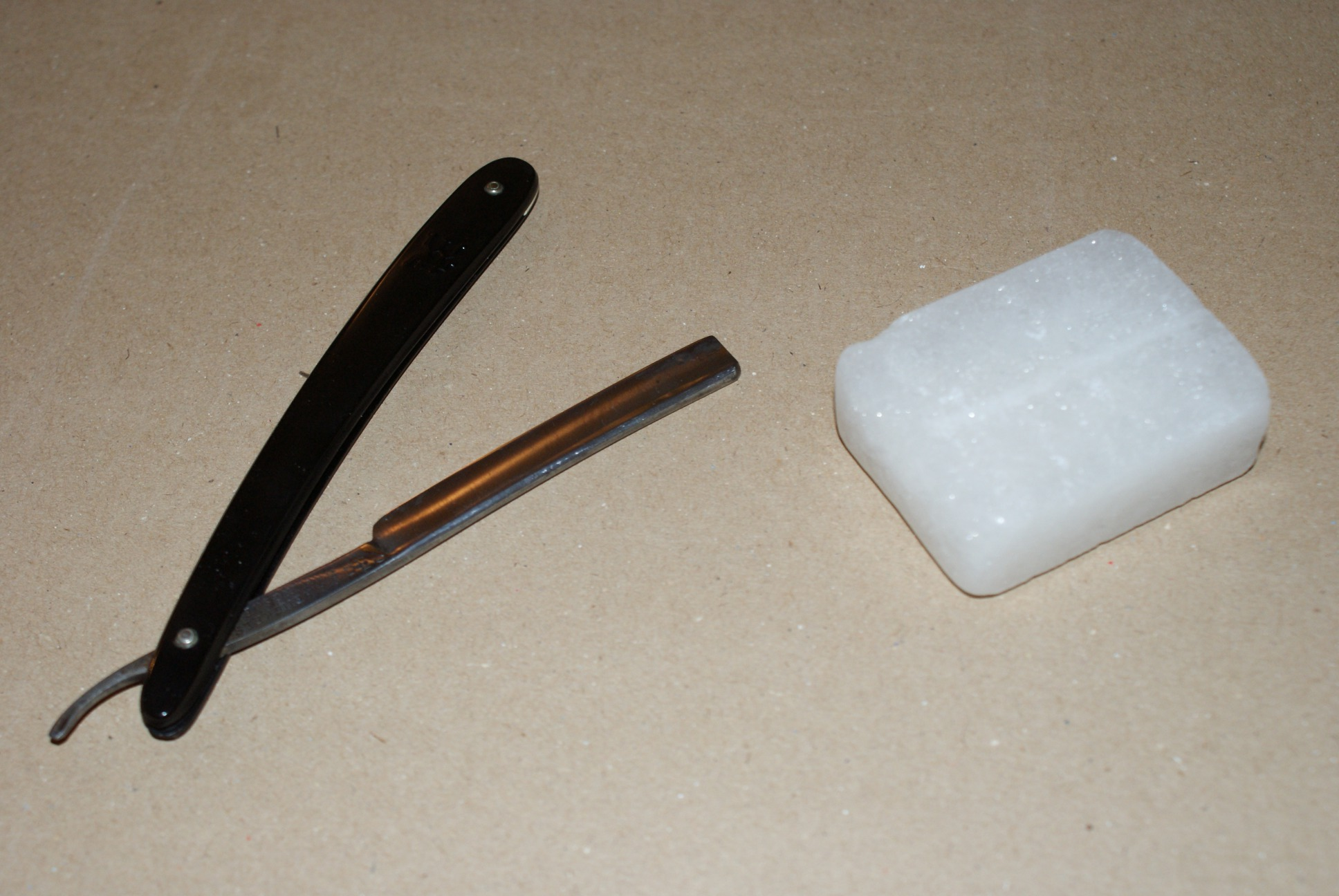
Alum block and razor

A styptic (also spelled stiptic) is a specific type of antihemorrhagic agent that works by contracting tissue to seal injured blood vessels. Styptic pencils contain astringents.

A common delivery system for this is a styptic or hemostatic pencil (not to be confused with a caustic pencil). This is a short stick of medication. Anhydrous aluminium sulfate is the main ingredient and acts as a vasoconstrictor in order to disable blood flow. The stick is applied directly to the bleeding site. The high ionic strength promotes flocculation of the blood, and the astringent chemical causes local vasoconstriction. Before safety razors were invented, a styptic pencil was a standard part of a shaving kit and was used to seal shaving cuts. Some people continue to use styptic pencils for minor skin wounds from safety or electric razors.

Styptic powder is used in the veterinary trade to stop bleeding from nails that are clipped too closely. This powder is generally used on animals, such as cats, dogs, and rabbits, whose vein is found in the center of the nail.

== See also ==
- ATC code B02 – Antihemorrhagics
- Hemostatic clamp
- Hemostatic Powder Spray TC-325
