= Advocate Good Samaritan Hospital =

- Advocate Aurora Health

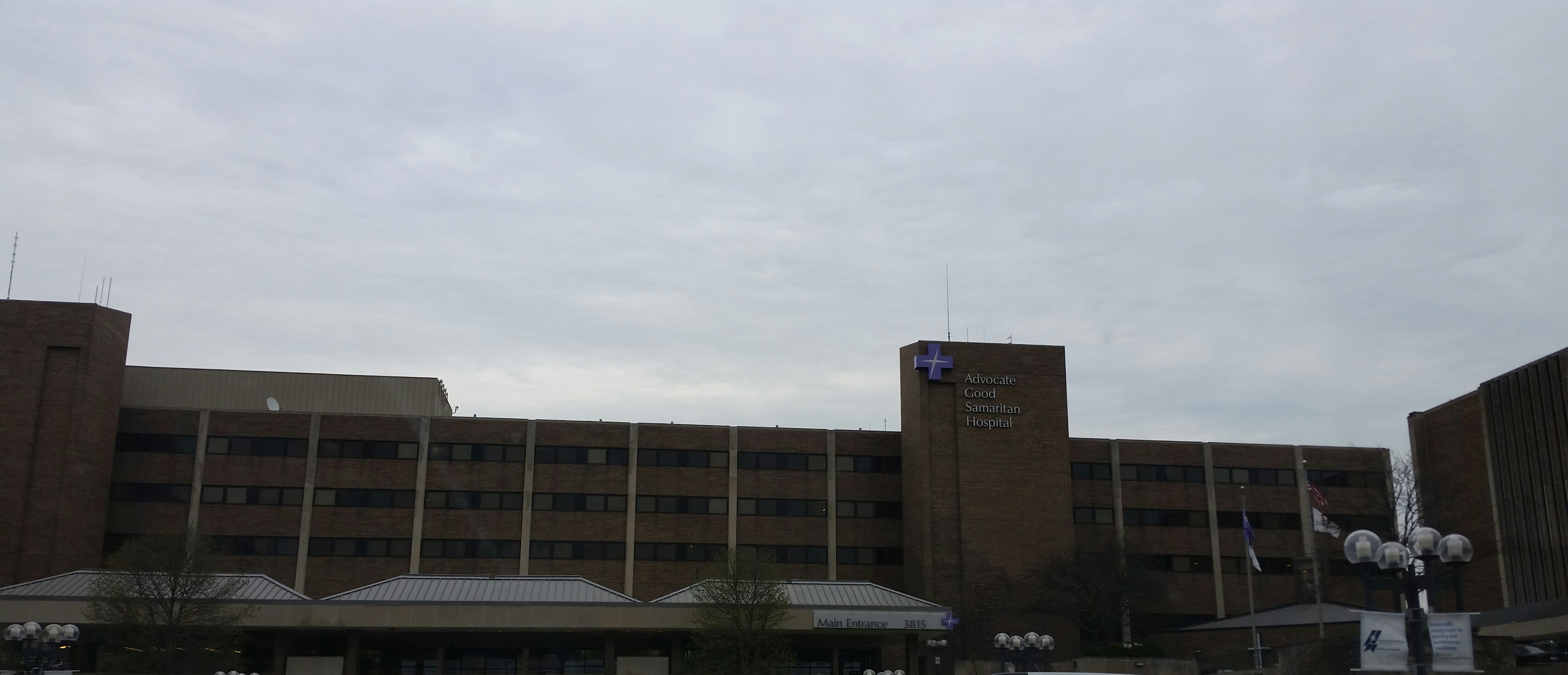
- Main entrance to the hospital

Geography
- Location: Downers Grove, Illinois, United States
- Coordinates: 41°49′04.822″N 88°00′31.856″W

Organization
- Care system: Private
- Type: Community
- Affiliated university: None

Services
- Emergency department: Level I trauma center
- Beds: 333
- Helipad: FAA LID: 0IL4

History
- Opened: 1976

Links
- Website: www.advocatehealth.com/gsam/
- Lists: Hospitals in Illinois

Advocate Good Samaritan Hospital is a 333-bed community hospital located in Downers Grove, in the US state Illinois. The hospital opened in 1976, and operates the only Level I trauma center in the county of DuPage. Advocate Good Samaritan Hospital is a part of Advocate Aurora Health.

Advocate Good Samaritan Hospital has earned a spot on the 100 Top Hospitals list five times.

== Services ==
Advocate Good Samaritan Hospital has 333 beds, and more than 1,000 physicians representing 63 specialties. There are 2,600 employees at the hospital, and services include: cardiology, orthopedic surgery, general surgery, gastroenterology, stroke care, obstetrics and gynecology, low dose diagnostic imaging, and a comprehensive breast center. The emergency department is the only Level I trauma center in DuPage County.

The hospital has level III designation for obstetric, perinatal and neonatal services, which is the highest designation in the state.

== Awards and recognition ==
Advocate Good Samaritan Hospital is the only health care provider in Illinois to have earned the Malcolm Baldrige National Quality Award—the highest presidential honor for performance excellence.

- 100 Top Hospitals National Benchmarks Study, 2009, 2011, 2012, 2013, 2014
- Magnet Recognition for Excellence in Nursing Services, 2009–14
- 50 Top Cardiovascular Hospitals, 2011
- Blue Distinction Center for Knee and Hip Replacement by Blue Cross Blue Shield of Illinois
- Bariatric Surgery Center of Excellence
- Lincoln Gold Award for Achievement of Excellence, 2010
- Practice Greenhealth Environmental Leadership Circle Award, 2012, 2013

== See also ==
- Advocate Lutheran General Hospital
- Advocate Sherman Hospital
