= Advocate Children's Hospital =

Coordinates: 41.723584°N 87.731987°W

- Advocate Aurora Health

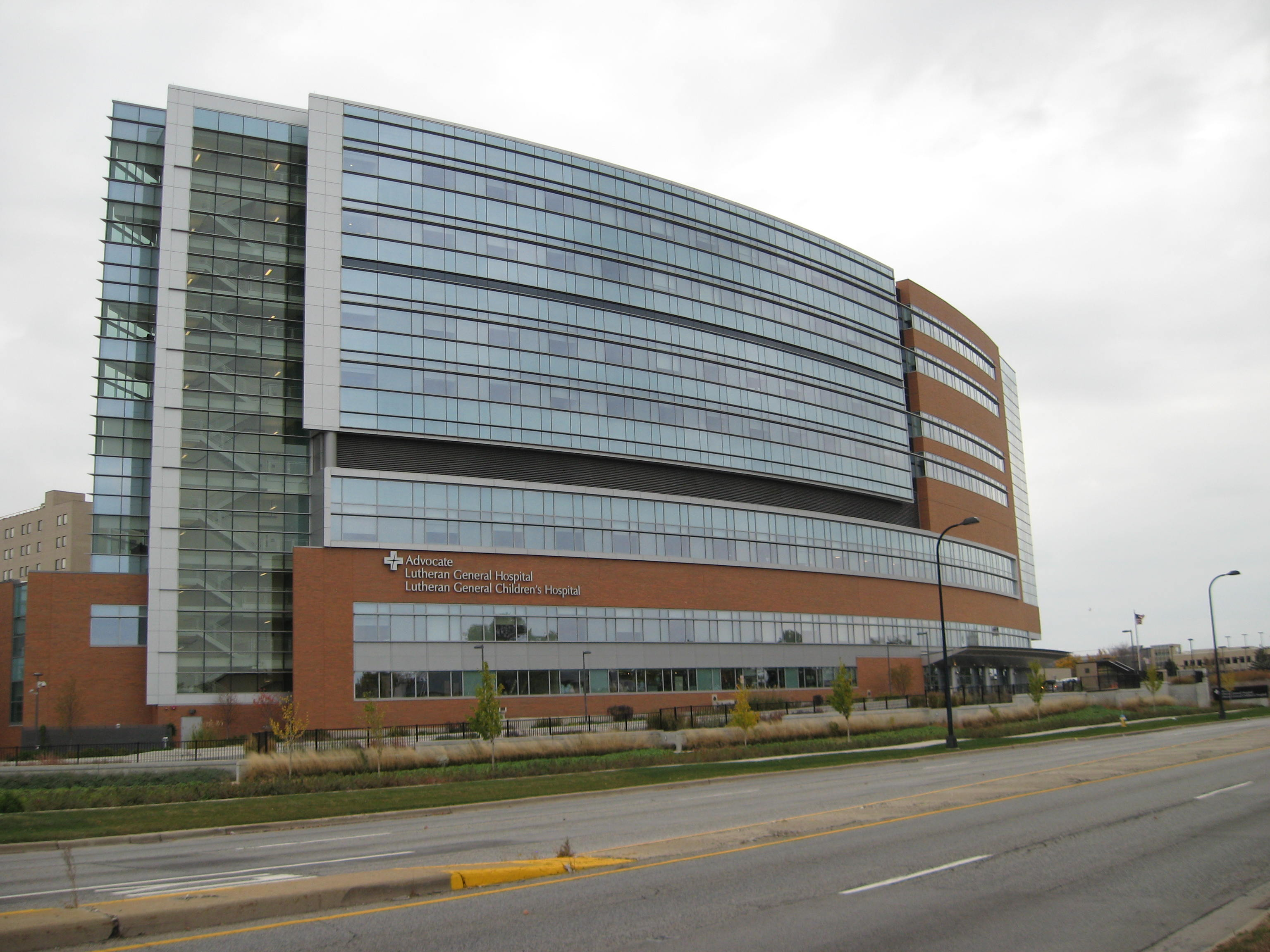
- Picture of the Park Ridge campus before the merger.

Geography
- Location: 4440 West 95th Street, Oak Lawn; 1675 Dempster Street, Park Ridge, Illinois, United States

Organization
- Type: Children's Teaching Hospital
- Affiliated university: Midwestern University; Rosalind Franklin University; University of Illinois
- Network: Advocate Aurora Health

Services
- Emergency department: Yes
- Beds: 259 and 150 bassinets

Helipads
- Helipad: FAA LID: IL77, Oak Lawn; FAA LID: 71IL, Park Ridge

History
- Opened: 2012

Links
- Website: Official website
- Lists: Hospitals in Illinois

Advocate Children's Hospital (ACH) is an academic pediatric acute care children's hospital located in Oak Lawn and Park Ridge, Illinois. The hospital has 259 pediatric beds and 150 bassinets between its two campuses. Advocate Children's operates a number of residency programs, which train newly graduated physicians in various pediatric specialties and subspecialties. The hospital is associated with the Chicago Medical School at Rosalind Franklin University of Medicine and Science and Chicago College of Osteopathic Medicine at Midwestern University, and is a member of Advocate Aurora Health. The hospital provides comprehensive pediatric specialties and subspecialties to infants, children, teens, and young adults aged 0–21 throughout Illinois and the Midwest. The hospital also sometimes treats adults that require pediatric care. Advocate Children's Hospital features the only children's hospital in the greater north and northwest than the suburban region of Chicago. Additionally, The hospital has outpatient centers and doctors offices around Illinois.

== History ==
Advocate Children's Hospital was formed in 2012 when Hope Children's Hospital in Oak Lawn merged with Lutheran Children's Hospital in Park Ridge.

Following a trend for children's hospitals in the Chicago region, Advocate Children's Hospital expanded in 2018 when the hospital added 11 beds to their neonatal intensive care unit.

In 2019 the hospital announced a partnership with University of Chicago Comer Children's Hospital and North Shore University Health System's pediatric division to help provide better pediatric care for children. The alliance is opening a joint 35,000-square-foot outpatient pediatric center in Wilmette.

== Services ==
In partnership with Advocate Lutheran General Hospital, ACH operates two cystic fibrosis care centers; one for adults and one for children. The hospital also operates specialized down syndrome centers, for adults and children with down syndrome. Additional services include: pediatric cancer care, emergency care, neurology, gastroenterology, orthopedics, general pediatrics, and general surgery.

The hospital features a 150-bed AAP verified level 3 neonatal intensive care unit, the highest in Illinois.

Advocate Children's Hospital operates a program that offers treatment to adults with congenital heart disease. Data released shows that the hospital has a lower mortality rate than the national average for congenital heart surgery.

== Recognition ==
In 2018, Advocate Children's Hospital ranked as the third best children's hospital in Illinois and ranked 23rd in pediatric cardiology and 38th in neonatology.

In 2020, U.S. News & World Report ranked the two campuses of Advocate Children's Hospital as the second best children's hospital in Illinois behind the Ann and Robert H. Lurie Children's Hospital. The hospital also ranked 13th in the nation in pediatric cardiology and heart surgery.

Also in 2020, both campuses of Advocate Children's Hospital received Best Children's Hospital designations by the Women's Choice Awards.

In U.S. News & World Report's 2025 rankings, the hospital was ranked nationally at #42 for Pediatric Cardiology & Heart Surgery. The hospital was also ranked as the #3 Best Children's Hospital in Illinois and #23 in the Midwest Region.

== See also ==
- List of Children's Hospitals in the United States
- Ann and Robert H. Lurie Children's Hospital
