= Epworth HealthCare =

Coordinates: 37°49′02″S 144°59′34″E

- Epworth Foundation

Geography
- Location: Victoria, Australia

Organisation
- Care system: Not-for-profit
- Affiliated university: Monash University; The University of Melbourne; Deakin University; La Trobe University

History
- Founded: 1920

Links
- Website: epworth.org.au

Epworth HealthCare is the trading name of the Epworth Foundation, a non-profit private hospital group that provides a wide range of acute medical, surgical and rehabilitation services in Melbourne, Victoria under the auspices of the Uniting Church. Epworth commenced in 1920 as a 25-bed hospital in a converted Erin Street, Richmond mansion, and has expanded to now encompass multiple sites through the acquisition of other private hospitals such as the adjacent Bethesda Hospital, Cedar Court Rehabilitation Hospital in Camberwell, and the Freemasons' Hospital in East Melbourne, or purpose built facilities such as Epworth Eastern in Box Hill, Epworth Hawthorn, and Epworth Geelong in Waurn Ponds, as well as a consulting suite in Lilydale.

== Epworth Hospital ==
Epworth Hospital opened on 28 February 1920, as a 25-bed community hospital initiated in the Yancowinna mansion situated at 34 Erin Street, Richmond, which had been purchased by the Methodist Church of Australasia in 1919 following a donation of A£6,000 by Sir Aaron Danks. Renovations to convert the mansion into a hospital cost A£3,324, partially donated by Georgina Sweet and her father in memory of Dr Margaret Sweet who "gave her life during the 1919 influenza epidemic".

The influence of the Methodist traditions can be found in the name Epworth, as this was the name of the village where John Wesley, founder of Methodism, was born. The intermediate hospital model chosen reflected that of the Salvation Army Bethesda Hospital (see below), to meet the needs of those who could not afford "full private hospital fees, and yet cannot be called poor". Members of the British Medical Association usually reduced or remitted their fees up to 25% for "intermediate" patients compared to those who were deemed "private" patients.

There proved to be such a need for beds that within five months of Epworth opening patients were being turned away, and nursing accommodation was converted into patient accommodation with nursing staff housed onsite in tents while renovations were undertaken to increase ward accommodation. Ethel Gray became Epworth's first matron soon after returning from France and England, where she had served as a hospital matron during World War I.

Epworth established a general nursing training school soon after opening in 1921. Training initially consisted of 3 years at Epworth plus a further year at Fairfield Infectious Diseases Hospital. It was the last private hospital to run an apprentice-style general training school in Australia, the final group graduating in early 1988.

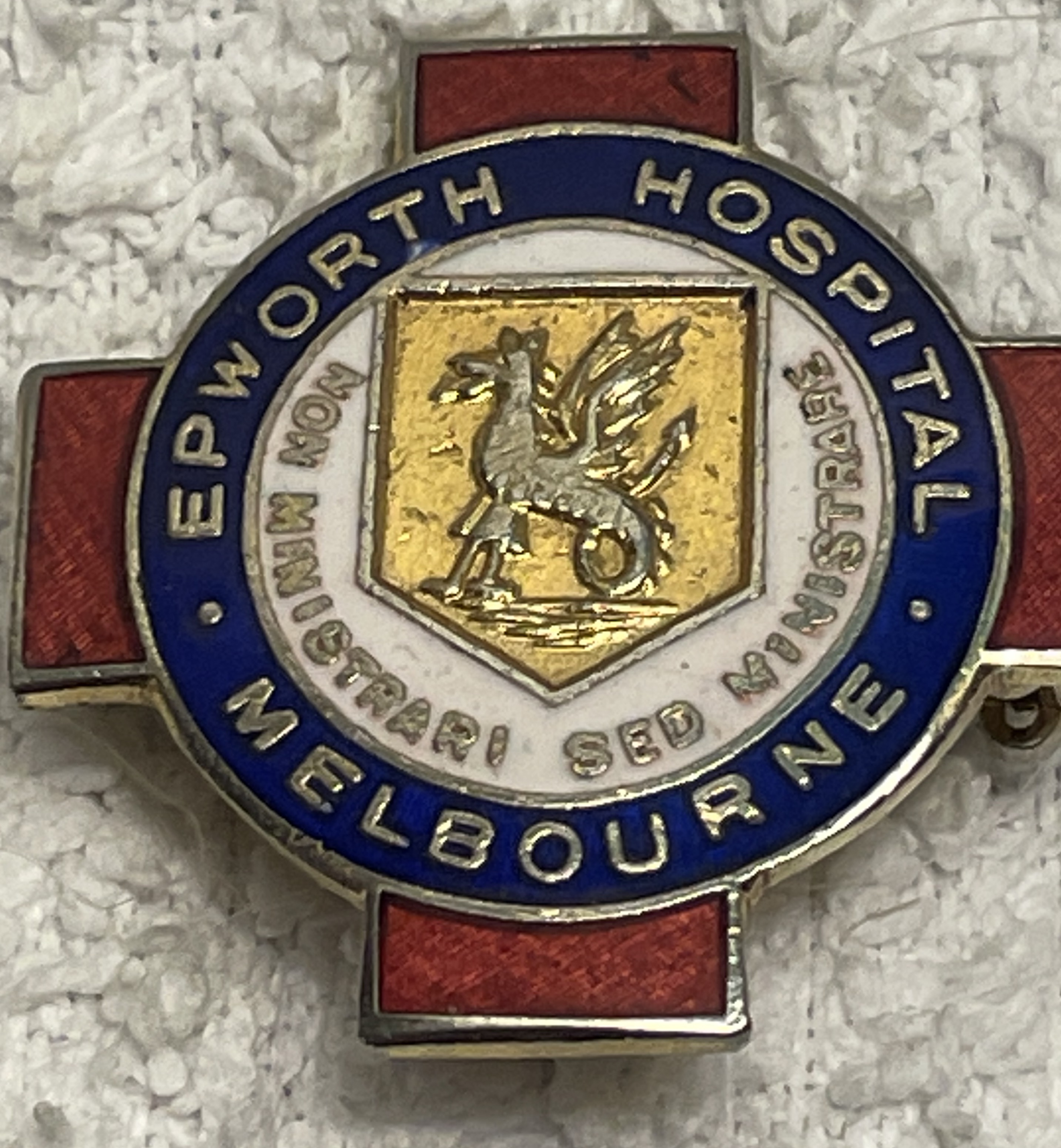
General Nursing Badge awarded to graduates of the Epworth Hospital General Nursing School (1924-1988). This particular design features a Wyvern and the motto Non ministrari sed ministrare (not to be served but to serve). The design was adopted for use by nursing training schools established by the Methodist Church in Adelaide (Memorial Hospital) and Sydney (Waverly War Memorial Hospital).

The first major works included extending the patient accommodation by adding wings on the original mansion, with wide verandahs featuring arches and rendered in stucco: these have since been glassed in where they survived and can be seen from the Erin Street perspective. The original floors in patient areas featured hardwood parquetry and remained in place in Ward 1 East until it was renovated to establish the first private Accident and Emergency department in Australia in the 1990s. The matron had a private apartment located in the fourth-floor attic space of the mansion. The original "central" portion and maternity wing of the old hospital in Erin Street was completed in 1930 at a cost of A£30,000.

The initial building program was completed mid 1931, with the extension of the westernmost building known as the Cato Wing. Two years later an additional building program was commenced at a projected cost of A£80,000 due to a bequest, and included the development of the nurses' quarters (for 125 nurses), domestic staff quarters (for 50 "maids"), boiler house, four additional operating theatres and two new wards, bringing the total patient accommodation from a previous 125 beds to 200 beds. The accommodation wing was opened in 1935. The new theatre suite included anaesthetic induction rooms, but anaesthetists were expected to provide the gases and other anaesthetic agents, unlike public hospitals where gases were piped from a central depot.

In 1936 the total cost of the developments in the previous three years was reported to have been A£130,000, a considerable amount considering the economic depression. Accommodation fees in 1935 were reported as being 2½ guineas (A£2/12/6 or ≈ $5.25) for intermediate patients or 3 guineas (A£3/3/0 or ≈ $6.30), when the average weekly wage in Australia around this time for males was A£4/1/7 (≈ $8.16) and A£2/3/10 (≈ $4.38) for females.

The nurses' residence and the domestic staff quarters (which later housed the school of nursing) were located towards the rear of the property. These were demolished in the 1990s to make way for additional patient accommodation.

=== Initial redevelopment ===
In the mid 1970s the Methodist Church of Victoria sought a state government guarantee of up to $17million to redevelop the Erin Street site in Richmond. Soon after, the first major redevelopment since the 1930s commenced, with the development of a six-level "south block". This development opened in 1982 and included three floors of 50 beds on each floor (divided into two wards each comprising three shared rooms of four beds each and 13 private rooms with ensuite) an intensive care unit, and an operating suite comprising seven theatres, as well as a new kitchen, staff cafeteria, and stores area in the basement, as well as a Westpac bank branch which opened for half a day every fortnight payday for staff. A space for pharmacy was created and let to Slades Pharmacy. This occurred at the same time that the Methodist Church was in the process of amalgamating with the Congregational Church and sections of the Presbyterian Church to establish the Uniting Church of Australia.

During this redevelopment, Epworth Hospital was incorporated as a not for profit entity by the Epworth Hospital Act 1980 (No. 9404), under the auspices of the Uniting Church of Australia, with the synod retaining the right of appointment to six of the eleven directors. In real terms, incorporation resulted in the Uniting Church relinquishing the asset that was Epworth Hospital, but at the same time removing any liability associated with medico-legal litigation. Surpluses and deficits arising from operational activities were therefore invested back into the hospital, rather than being paid back to the church.

== Bethesda Hospital ==
The Salvation Army Hospital Bethesda ("place of healing") Hospital in 1906 at 30-32 Erin Street. Prior to establishing Bethesda, under the leadership of Elizabeth Spargo (who later became the first matron) the Salvation Army "Samaritan Nurses" provided domiciliary nursing to sick and needy people in Richmond and surrounding suburbs, including Collingwood. The domiciliary nursing service continued for some time, and this arrangement was described as being unique. In 1910 Bethesda Hospital was registered as the first non-public Nurse training school in an intermediate hospital in Victoria, and in the early 1940s provided opportunities for indigenous nurses to train due to the refusal of nursing schools in South Australia and Western Australia to accept indigenous students

The Salvation Army purchased the former mansion Kooralbyn opposite Bethesda Hospital in 1919 for use as a mothers' hospital and renamed it Elim, claiming that no reliable translation of Kooralbyn (brown snake) was possible. In 1940 the mansion was converted for use as nurses' quarters.

In 1927 Bethesda was the first private hospital in Australia to establish a radiology and pathology department. The Xray department served both Epworth and Bethesda Hospitals, the genesis of the Melbourne Diagnostic Group. In 1935 a low voltage x-ray machine was purchased from Germany and installed in the X-ray Department for the use of radiotherapy to treat certain types of cancer.

The last major building project at Bethesda occurred in 1937 at a cost of £40,000 – half of what Epworth had spent in their redevelopments during this time.

With the redevelopment of Epworth in the 1980s immediately next door Bethesda was comparatively run down, and lacked basic facilities such as air conditioning and bedside piped suction and oxygen.

Bethesda had been close to closure in 1981, when the Motor Accident Board (later to become the Transport Accident Commission) agreed to fund the hospital as a rehabilitation service at the public facilities as the Royal Talbot Rehabilitation Centre of the Austin Hospital had reached capacity. The focus of the Bethesda therefore changed from being a small medical surgical hospital to rehabilitation. Bethesda converted the Elim site (originally the Bethesda nurses quarters) for the use of outpatient rehabilitation, and at to 30 Erin Street site converted three of the four inpatient wards to rehabilitation care, the remaining second floor ward nearest the theatre suite was retained for medical surgical patients. The hospital prospered under the leadership of Major Warren Golding, and in 1993 the Salvation Army approved the extensive redevelopment of both the Elim site (a large hydrotherapy pool and multilevel car park) as well as new ward blocks and a new theatre suite in a four floor development towards the southern end of the Erin Street/Normanby Place site.

=== Purchase of Bethesda Hospital ===
In 1998 Epworth acquired the adjoining Bethesda Hospital from The Salvation Army. With the opening of the Epworth Centre, built across the boundaries of the two older hospitals, full integration into a single entity was achieved for the Richmond campus, Epworth Richmond resulting in largest not-for-profit private hospital on one site in Australia.

== Subsequent expansion ==
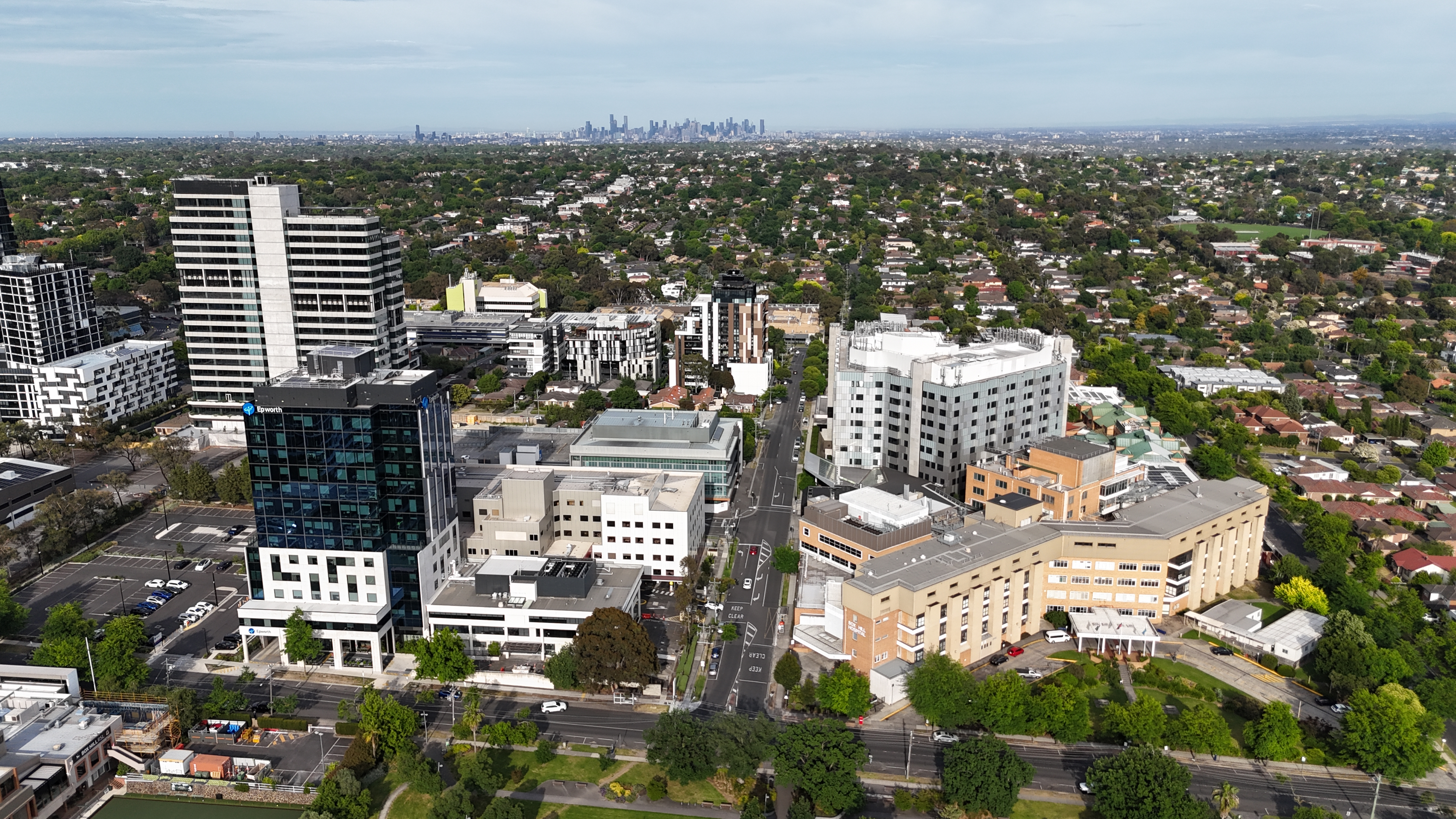
Aerial view of Box Hill Hospital (right) and Epworth Eastern (left) looking west down Arnold Street towards Melbourne CBD, Melbourne

A Hospital in the Home service was established in 2000 and approved by the federal government in 2001.

Early in 2002 Epworth acquired Box Hill Gardens Medical Centre and Day Surgery Unit, and the following year commenced a major redevelopment to establish a 185 bed hospital to be known as Epworth Eastern, and was officially opened by the then federal minister for health, Tony Abbott on 2 August 2005.

The Brighton Rehabilitation Centre (the former Florence Nightingale Hospital established in 1925) was acquired in 2003, and renamed Epworth Brighton, to expand the number of rehabilitation beds and services available for patients and establishing a musculoskeletal research centre. In June 2024 this facility was closed as part of a rationalisation process within the rehabilitation service that had been announced in 2023.

In collaboration with the Peter MacCallum Cancer Centre, in 2003 Epworth opened the Tattersall's Cancer Centre, the fourth place in the world to use image-guided radiation therapy, and being home to the first combined linear accelerator and CT scanner in the southern hemisphere.

The first robotic assisted surgery in Australia occurred in December 2003, and the following year acquired the robotic surgical system, the first private hospital to do so. A Gastrointestinal Oncology Centre was established in 2005.

The Epworth Breast Service also opened in 2005, with a multidisciplinary team offering a patient centred service specialising in breast disease. In July the new Acquired Brain Injury (ABI) Unit opened as part of Epworth Rehabilitation.

Epworth Freemasons became part of the group in May 2006, with Epworth operating the hospital and the ING Group retaining ownership, bringing Epworth's overall bed capacity to more than 1,150. Six months later, the Freemasons' emergency department was closed, and the staff transferred to the Richmond campus to consolidate the emergency service.

Epworth Rehabilitation expanded to include a site at Camberwell with the purchase of Cedar Court in 2009, having previously leased the site.

== Associations ==
The Epworth Sleepiness Scale by Dr. Murry Johns is named after this hospital group.

== Gallery ==
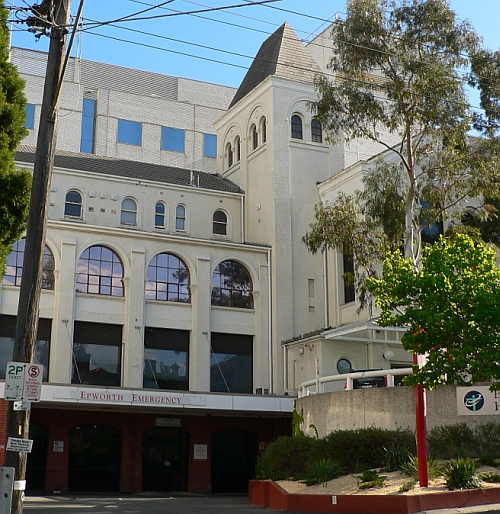
Old 1930s Spanish Mission style buildings at Epworth Hospital Richmond

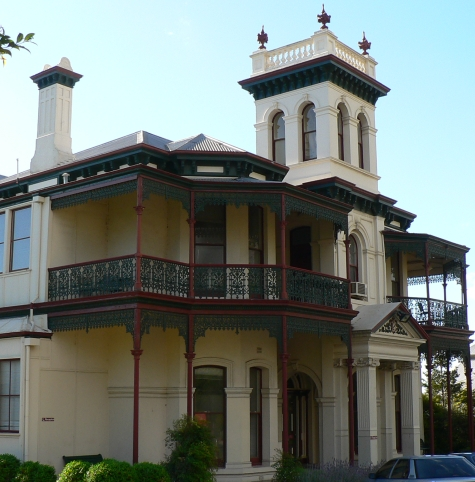
Former mansion "Elim" on Erin Street now an outpatient rehabilitation centre.
