= Advocate Sherman Hospital =

Hospital in Elgin, Illinois, U.S.

- Advocate Aurora Health
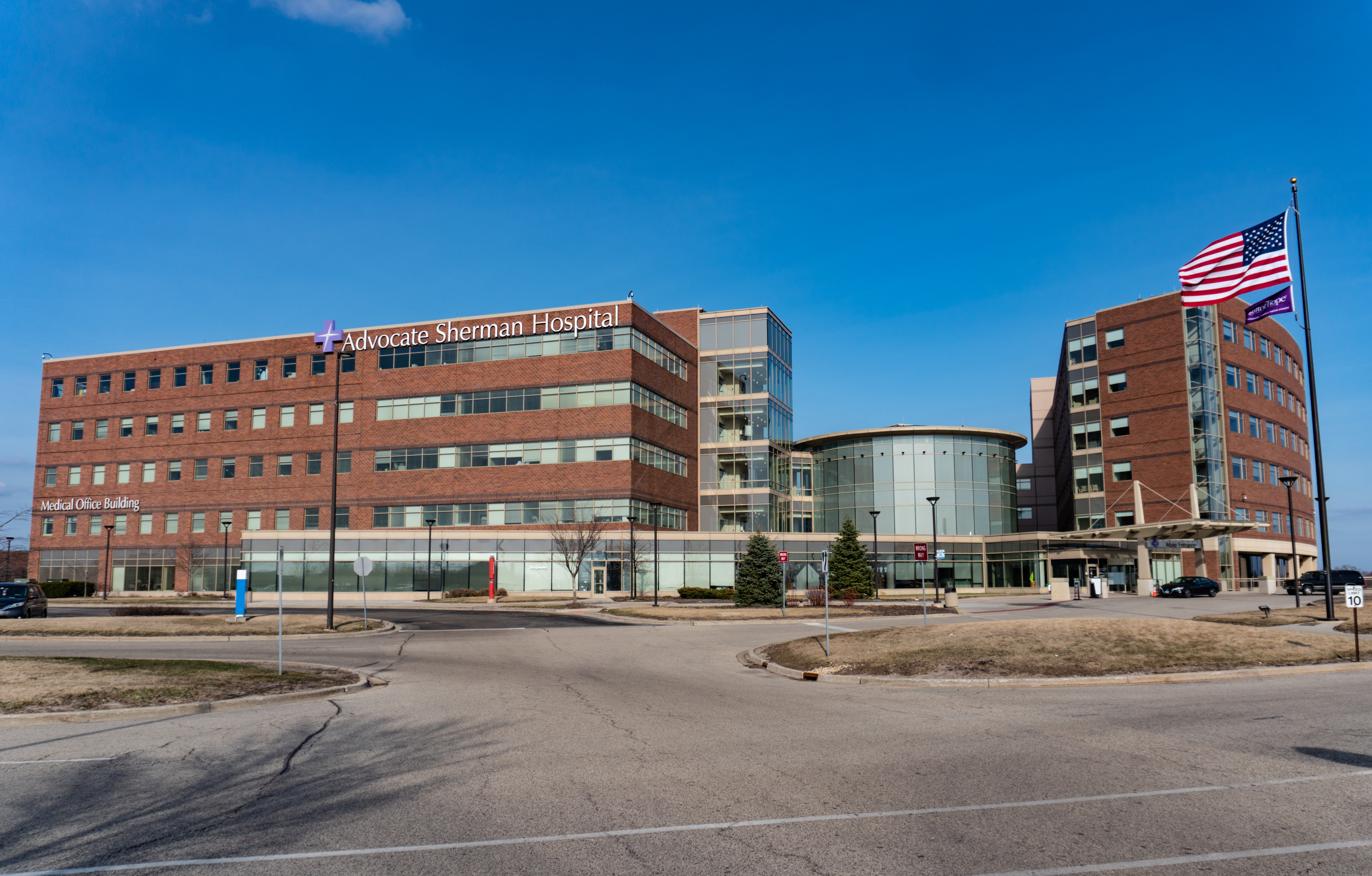

Geography
- Location: 1425 North Randall Road, Elgin, Illinois, United States
- Coordinates: 42°04′12″N 88°19′49″W

Services
- Emergency department: Level II trauma center
- Beds: 255

Helipads
- Helipad: yes

History
- Founded: 1888

Links
- Website: www.advocatehealth.com/sherman/
- Lists: Hospitals in Illinois

Advocate Sherman Hospital is a hospital located in Elgin, Illinois. It contains 281 beds, and is one of the most premier regional hospitals in the country, specializing in heart surgeries. It is ranked "high performing" in dealing with heart failure by U.S. News. It performs more cardiac procedures than any other hospital in Kane, McHenry, DuPage, Lake and Will counties. Other services include a level II trauma center, cancer care services, diabetes center, orthopedic care and the birthing center with a neonatal intensive care nursery. The hospital is a part of Advocate Aurora Health.

Advocate Sherman is considered to be above average, and is ranked in the top 100 hospitals in the United States, out of a group of around 3,100.

== History ==
Sherman Hospital opened on July 7, 1888, in a two-story Elgin house donated by local drug store owner and prominent businessman, Henry Sherman. There were four beds and one operating room. After numerous additions between 1895 and 1999, the hospital had grown to 353 beds. Advocate Sherman's first open-heart surgery was performed in 1972. It was also one of the first open heart surgeries performed in a community hospital in the USA.

In 2009, in need of a new and more modern campus, a new building was constructed on Randall Road, and opened on December 15, 2009. It included a 15-acre geothermal lake to heat and cool the hospital, making it the largest geothermal system in Illinois, and one of only two hospitals in the United States using this method.

Scenes from the 2011 movie Contagion were shot in the old Sherman Hospital

On March 30, 2020, Illinois Governor J. B. Pritzker announced that the partially demolished old Sherman Hospital would be converted into an overflow center for COVID-19 patients during the COVID-19 pandemic. Private contractors and the US Army Corps of Engineers began work converting the abandoned building into a 230-280 bed facility equipped to handle a surge in hospitalizations caused by the virus. As of December 2020, the site had yet to be used, but the building was in standby mode, ready to accept patients as needed.

== See also ==
- Advocate Lutheran General Hospital
- Advocate Good Samaritan Hospital
