= Aurora St. Luke's Medical Center =

- Aurora Health Care
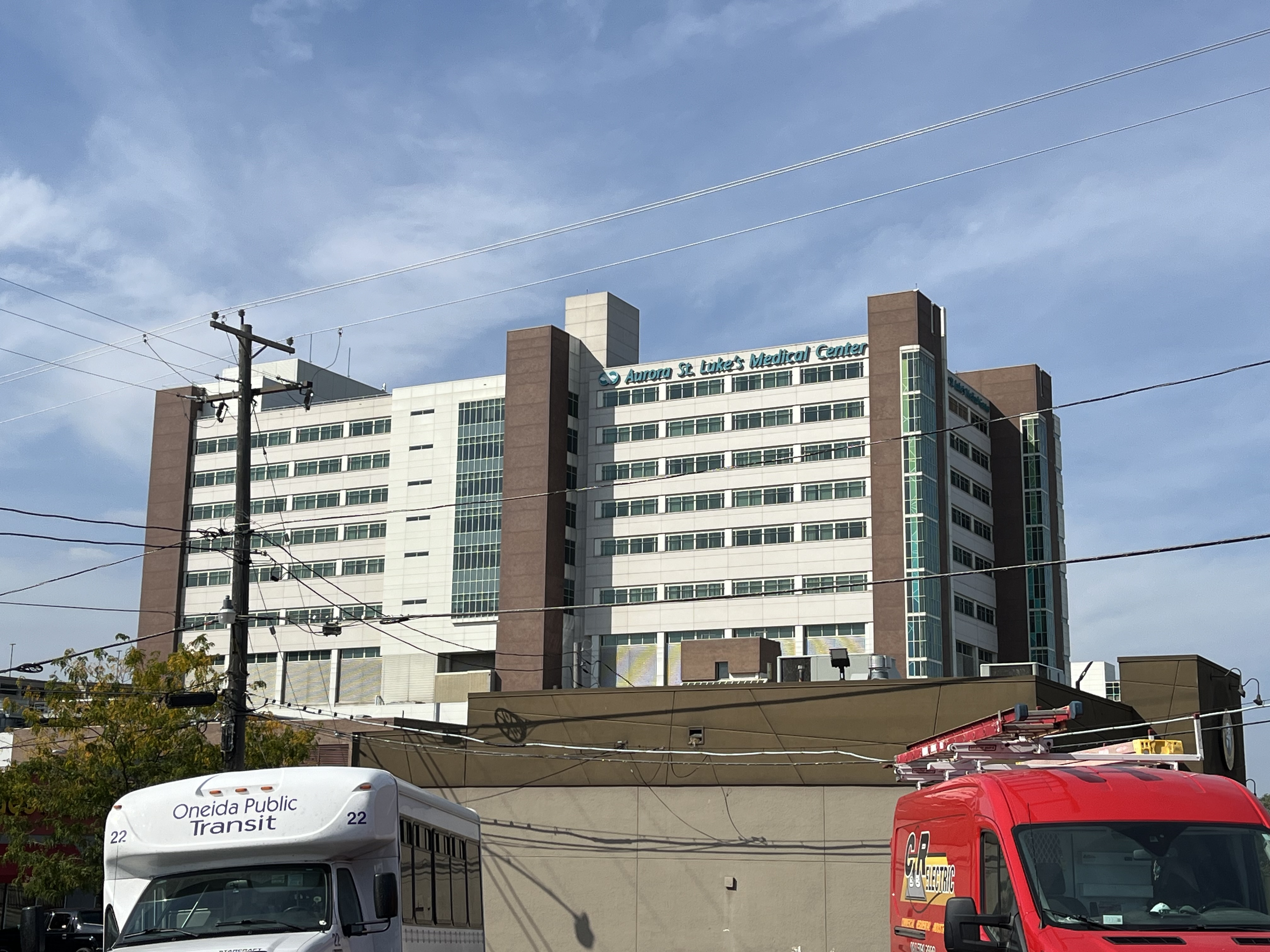

Geography
- Location: Milwaukee, Wisconsin, United States
- Coordinates: 42°59′24″N 87°57′02″W

Organization
- Type: General

Links
- Website: www.aurorastlukes.org
- Lists: Hospitals in Wisconsin

Aurora St. Luke's Medical Center is a private hospital located in Milwaukee, Wisconsin. It is one of the 15 hospitals of Aurora Health Care, a non-profit health care system founded in 1984 and headquartered in Milwaukee, Wisconsin.
