= Advocate Aurora Health =

U.S. non-profit hospital network

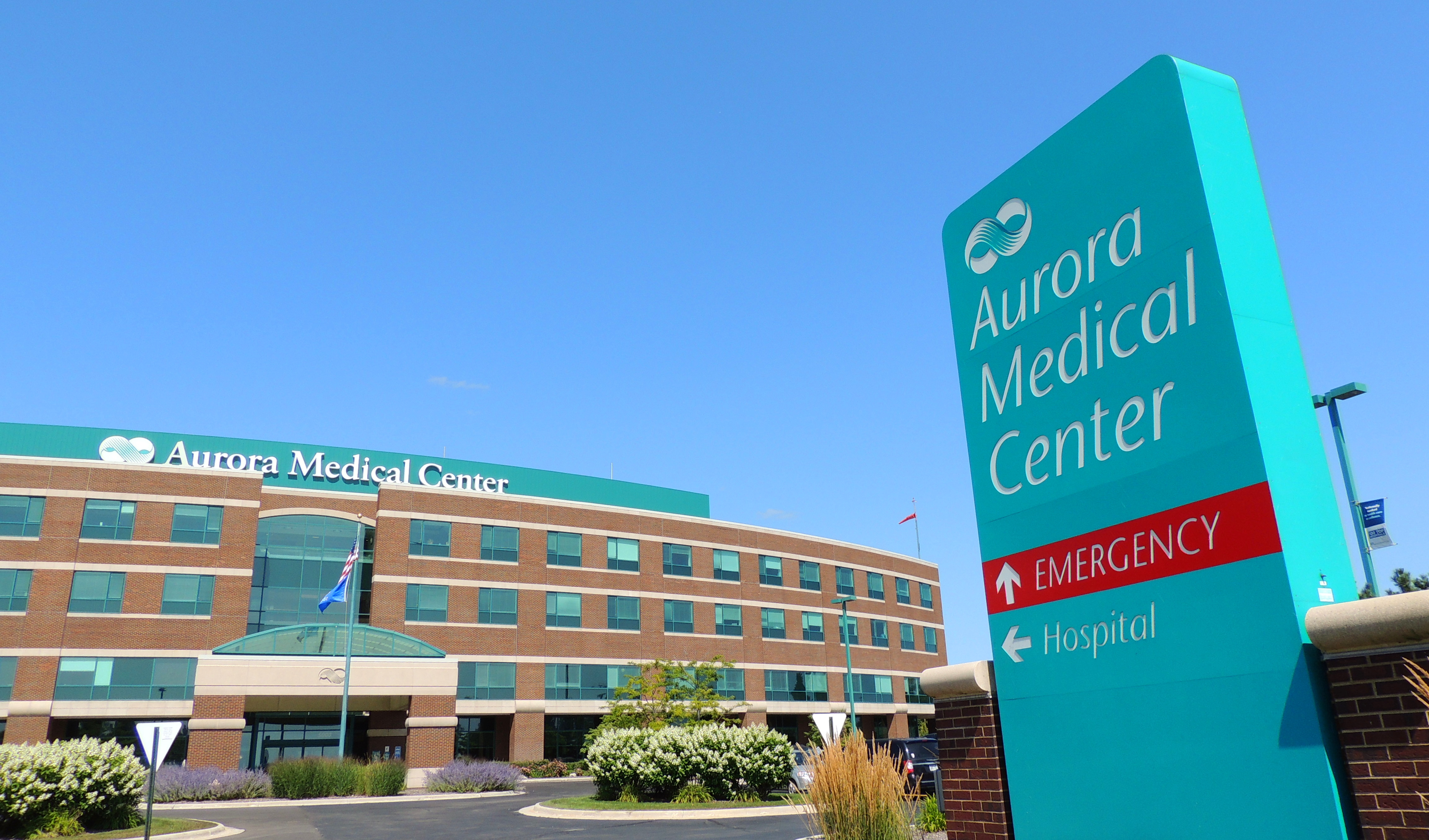
- Aurora Medical Center - Manitowoc County, in Two Rivers, Wisconsin
- Type: Not-for-profit corporation
- Industry: Health care
- Predecessor: Advocate Health Care and Aurora Health Care
- Founded: 2018; 8 years ago
- Defunct: December 2, 2022
- Fate: Acquired by Atrium Health
- Successor: Advocate Health
- Headquarters: Milwaukee, Wisconsin; Downers Grove, Illinois
- Area served: Eastern Wisconsin and Illinois
- Key people: Eugene A. Woods, CEO
- Revenue: $12 billion
- Number of employees: 75,000 (2022)

Advocate Aurora Health (AAH) was a non-profit, faith-based hospital network with dual headquarters located in Milwaukee, Wisconsin, and Downers Grove, Illinois. In 2021, the AAH system had 26 hospitals and more than 500 sites of care, with 75,000 employees, including 10,000 employed physicians. The health system formed as a result of a merger between Illinois-based Advocate Health Care and Wisconsin-based Aurora Health Care. AAH was a teaching affiliate of the University of Wisconsin School of Medicine and Public Health. In December 2022, it merged with the network of Atrium Health to create Advocate Health.

== History ==
=== Aurora Health Care ===
==== 1980–1990s ====
In 1984, St. Luke's Medical Center and Good Samaritan Medical Center formed an affiliation called St. Luke's Samaritan Health Care. In 1987, the organization was renamed to Aurora Health Care. In 1988, after forming a partnership with Aurora, the Visiting Nurse Association (VNA) of Milwaukee joined Aurora Health Care. Between 1992 and 1995, the health care system added five more hospitals: Sheboygan Memorial Medical Center (1992), Milwaukee Psychiatric Hospital (1993), Hartford Memorial Hospital (1993), Two Rivers Community Hospital (1993), and West Allis Memorial Hospital (1995).

In 1995, two additional hospitals joined Aurora Health Care: Lakeland Medical Center in Elkhorn, owned by Walworth County, and Trinity Memorial Hospital in Cudahy, founded in 1958 and owned by Catholic Health Corp. Aurora acquired Lakeland Medical Center for about $16 million. In the deal, Aurora assumed the hospital's bond obligations and debt and agreed to contribute to a fund to cover the uninsured. In February 1996, Memorial Hospital of Burlington joined Aurora Health Care.

In 1998, Aurora built its first hospital, on the west side of Kenosha, which opened in February 1999. That same year Aurora replaced Two Rivers Community Hospital with a new facility, which opened in June 2000.

==== 2000s ====
In 2002, a five-story Aurora Women's Pavilion was opened at West Allis Memorial Hospital and Aurora St. Luke's Medical Center moved its Labor & Delivery services to that location. On October 27, 2003, the health care system opened a new 84-bed hospital in Oshkosh. In 2004, a 270-bed twelve-story tower opened at St. Luke Medical Center, which was built atop the existing parking structure.

In March 2004, Aurora Health Care announced a new QuickCare service, the first of its kind in the Milwaukee area. The kiosks, known as Aurora QuickCare, are staffed by providers who handle basic, common medical issues for a flat rate. Aurora has opened 19 of these facilities including five in Walmart Supercenters.

In 2006, after 22 years at the health care organization, G. Edwin Howe retired as president and chief executive officer. Nick Turkal, a family practice physician and president of Aurora's metro Milwaukee region, was chosen as Howe's replacement. Turkal had been employed by Aurora Health Care since 1987.

In March 2001, Aurora announced plans to build a new hospital in the Pabst Farms development in the city of Oconomowoc. The Oconomowoc Common Council rezoned the property in June 2001, preventing the development. Aurora sued Oconomowoc because it believed that the rezoning was done illegally. In 2004, Aurora revealed plans to construct a hospital in the Pabst Farms development located in the Town of Summit a few hundred feet (around 100 meters) south of the proposed Oconomowoc site. In 2007, the Summit Town Board approved the new Aurora hospital, which was planned to have a capacity of 110 beds and to have been completed in March 2010.

On July 31, 2007, Advanced Healthcare, an independent practice in southeastern Wisconsin, and Aurora Health Care announced that they would join "under a broad affiliation agreement". According to the agreement, the leadership of Advanced Healthcare would remain intact. In concert with the purchase announcement, Aurora and Advanced Healthcare constructed the new Aurora Medical Center Grafton in Grafton, Wisconsin, which opened in late 2010. Health care industry experts estimated the total cost of purchasing Advanced Healthcare and constructing the Grafton hospital at $250 million.

=== Advocate Aurora Health ===
On December 4, 2017, Aurora Health Care and Advocate Health Care of Illinois announced a merger agreement. On April 2, 2018, the hospital networks merged creating Advocate Aurora Health. On January 9, 2020, Advocate Aurora Health announced that it would sell Advocate Eureka Hospital in Eureka, Illinois and Advocate BroMenn Medical Center in Normal, Illinois to the Carle healthcare system. On July 2, they were purchased for $190 million.

In October 2021, AAH fired over 400 full- and part-time employees for not getting vaccinated against the COVID-19 virus. In May 2022, Advocate Aurora Health agreed to merge with Atrium Health, assuming the Advocate brand, but based at Atrium Health's headquarters in Charlotte, NC.

=== Atrium Health merger ===
The merger was first announced in May 2022. Atrium Health operates in North Carolina, South Carolina, Georgia and Alabama. The combined company will operate in six states: Illinois, Wisconsin, North Carolina, South Carolina, Georgia and Alabama. It will have 67 hospitals and 150,000 employees with $27 billion in annual revenue. It will be the fifth largest hospital system in the country. The combined organization would be called Advocate Health and be headquartered in Charlotte, North Carolina. Initially both Gene Woods, CEO of Atrium, and Jim Skogsbergh, CEO of Advocate Aurora, will be co-CEOs for a year and a half until Skogsbergh retires then Woods will be the sole CEO.

The deal will not affect Atrium' Health's new medical school Wake Forest School of Medicine and the medical innovation district The Pearl. The medical school will be the academic core of the newly combined company. Currently Advocate does have partnerships with nearby medical schools and supports research. However, they do not have their own medical school or innovation district. Dr Julie Ann Freischlag, CEO of AHWFB and dean of the WFU School of Medicine, stated completing clinical trials and finding new treatment approaches will be easier with a larger patient population.

The deal faced a number of approval hurdles. The North Carolina Attorney General stated he would not oppose the deal, the Federal Trade Commission reviewed the merger, the deal was subject to Illinois and Wisconsin approval since Advocate Aurora is based in both states. The deal was temporarily blocked by Illinois health board and then decided to postpone the vote. During a special meeting on November 14, 2022, the board voted 6–0 to approve the deal. The merger was completed on December 2, 2022.

== See also ==
- Aurora St. Luke's Medical Center
- Advocate Christ Medical Center
- Advocate Lutheran General Hospital
- Advocate Illinois Masonic Medical Center
- Advocate Good Samaritan Hospital
- Advocate Children's Hospital
- Advocate Sherman Hospital

== Research ==
Formed in 2010, the Advocate Aurora Research Institute was part of Advocate Aurora Health, which conducted research and clinical trials. In 2019, the Advocate Aurora Research Institute conducted 621 clinical trials, published 505 scientific articles, and received $36.8 million in external funding.

Launched in 2014, Advocate Aurora Health publishes the Journal of Patient-Centered Research and Reviews (JPCRR), a peer-reviewed, open-access medical journal. JPCRR content is published quarterly, with content freely available online.
