= Advocate Lutheran General Hospital =

- Advocate Aurora Health
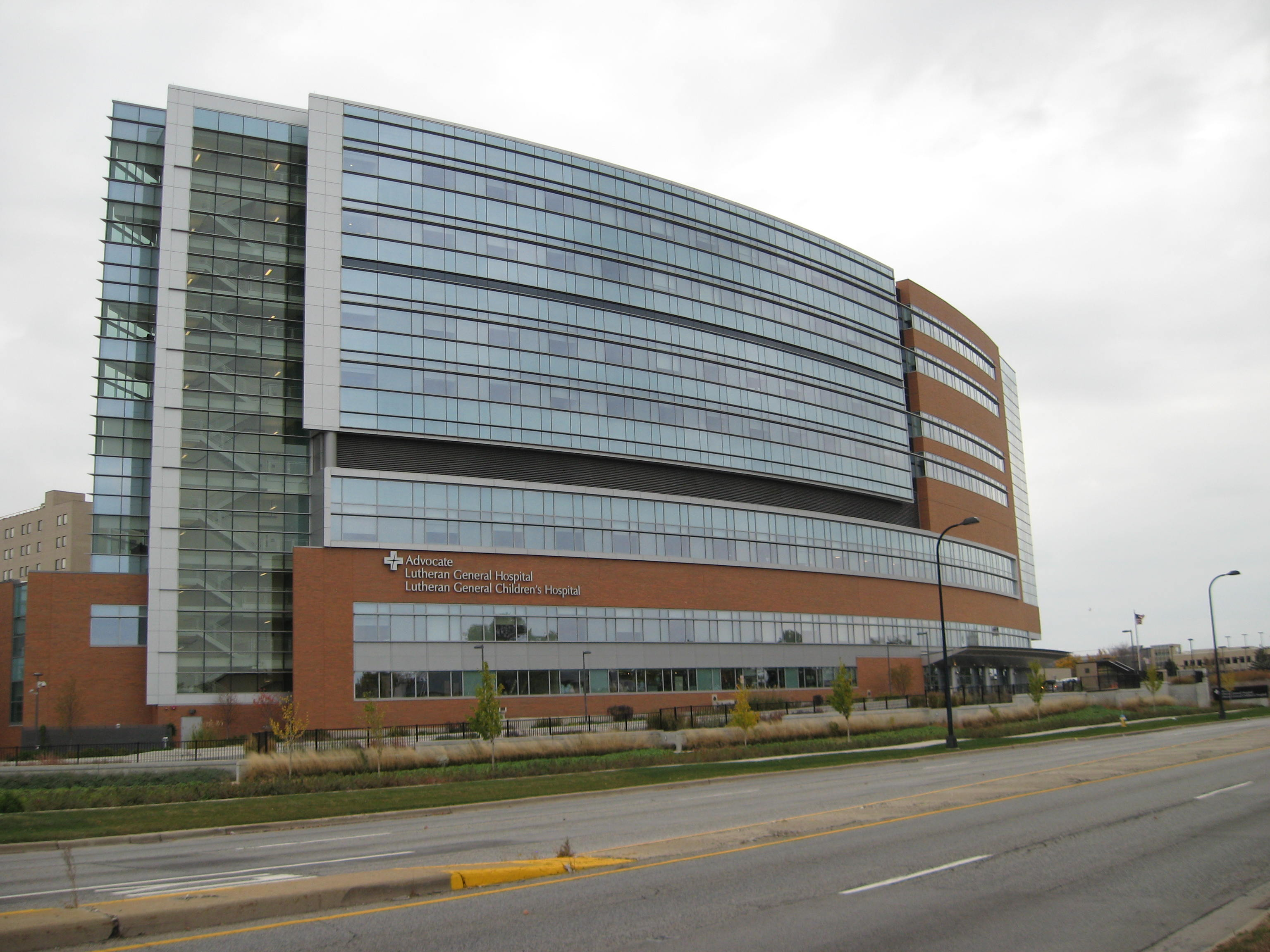

Geography
- Location: Park Ridge, Illinois, United States
- Coordinates: 42.0388°N 87.8473°W

Organization
- Type: Teaching, Research, Children's & Referral
- Affiliated university: Midwestern University; Rosalind Franklin University; University of Illinois

Services
- Emergency department: Level I trauma center
- Beds: 645

History
- Former names: Norwegian Lutheran Deaconess Hospital; Lutheran General Hospital
- Founded: 1897

Links
- Website: advocatehealth.com/luth
- Lists: Hospitals in Illinois

Advocate Lutheran General Hospital (previously Lutheran General Hospital) is a 645-bed non-profit teaching hospital located in the Chicago suburb of Park Ridge, Illinois. Founded in 1897, Advocate Lutheran General Hospital is the sixth largest hospital in the Chicago area, and it operates a Level I trauma center. It also is home to Advocate Children's Hospital – Park Ridge, the only children's hospital in the greater north and northwest suburban region of Chicago. The hospital is a part of Advocate Aurora Health.

In the last year with available data, Advocate Lutheran General Hospital had 29,025 admissions, 62,544 emergency department visits, and its surgeons performed 6,728 inpatient and 12,431 outpatient surgeries. The hospital is gold certified by the Leadership in Energy and Environmental Design (LEED). The inpatient rehabilitation program accredited by the Commission on Accreditation of Rehabilitation Facilities (CARF). The echocardiogram lab is accredited by the Intersocietal Accreditation Commission.

ALGH operates a number of residency programs, which train newly graduated physicians in various specialties and sub-specialties. The hospital is associated with the Chicago Medical School at Rosalind Franklin University of Medicine and Science and Chicago College of Osteopathic Medicine at Midwestern University.

== History ==
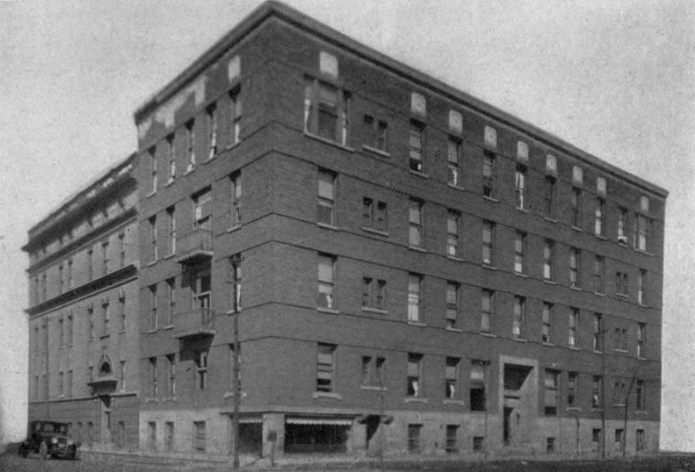
Lutheran Deaconess Home and Hospital, 1138 North Leavitt Street, Chicago in 1922

The hospital originally opened in 1897 as Norwegian Lutheran Deaconess Hospital, with 25 beds. The hospital operated in a rented building located at Artesian Avenue and LeMoyne Street in the Humboldt Park neighborhood for five years. In 1902, a new building was constructed at Haddon Avenue and Leavitt Street. Lutheran Deaconess Hospital grew at this location, with the addition of medical wings, including a 215-bed west wing, and a nursing school. In 1969, with an excess of hospital services within walking distance, Lutheran Deaconess Hospital closed. Operations and staff were transitioned to the newly established Lutheran General Hospital in Park Ridge.

Lutheran General Hospital then opened at its current location in Park Ridge in 1959. The 326-bed hospital building was constructed at a cost of $7.6 million, and included a nursing school. In 1969, the hospital opened a 73-bed alcohol rehabilitation center. In 1976, LGH established a residency training program for internal medicine. In 1980, the Parkside Professional Building opened, and the hospital integrated into a network of health and human services organizations with more than 75 locations, adopting the name Lutheran General HealthSystem (LGHS). In 1986, LGH obtained its first MRI imaging machine, and the hospital was designated a level 1 trauma center. In 1987, Lutheran General merged with Augustana Hospital. In 1992, the hospital opened a new center for adults with down syndrome.

In 1995, the hospital's parent organization (LGHS) merged with Evangelical Health Systems Corporation to create Advocate Health Care. The same year, the hospital opened the Genesis Clinic of Health and Empowerment, a community health center for local Hispanic residents. In 1996, the hospital opened a new helipad on a 2,115-square-foot landing deck at a cost of $900,000. The same year, in 1996, LGH opened the Center for Advanced Care, a 54,500 square foot building at a cost of $27.1 million. In 2003, in partnership with Maine Township High School District 207 and Advocate Medical Group, LGH established a school based clinic at its neighboring Maine East High School. The same year (2003), ALGH opened a $25 million surgical expansion unit for minimally invasive surgery.

In 2005, ALGH was recognized as a magnet hospital by the American Nurses Credentialing Center. The same year, the hospital received state regulatory approval for the construction of a new eight-story, 192-bed patient care tower, which was completed in 2009 at a cost of $200 million. The tower is LEED certified to gold designation. In 2006, the Loeber Memorial Cancer Research Laboratory was established.

In 2011, Advocate Lutheran General Hospital began offering cyberknife surgeries with its Illinois CyberKnife. The facility uses CyberKnife technology to treat malignant and benign tumors non-surgically. Illinois CyberKnife established The Brain and Spine Tumor Clinic with Advocate Lutheran General Hospital. Also in 2011, the hospital started a donor breast milk program, using breast milk from the Indiana Mother's Milk Bank. It was the first breast bank in the Chicago area.

In 2012, the Russell Center for Research and Innovation was established. That same year, the hospital was recognized by Chicago Magazine as a top Chicago area hospital, and was ranked 7th in Illinois by U.S. News & World Report. A new emergency department, operating suites and loading dock were built as a part of a $40 million expansion project expected, to be completed in spring 2015. In 2012, physicians used Hemospray for a patient with life-threatening gastrointestinal bleeding; it was the first use of Hemospray in the United States, outside of a clinical trial.

In 2019, a nine-bed neurology intensive care unit was built. In March 2020, the hospital admitted patients with COVID-19, as the COVID-19 pandemic developed. The same month, the hospital began offering drive-through testing.

== Services ==
Advocate Lutheran General Hospital operates a bone marrow transplant program.

ALGH was the first hospital in the Midwest to offer 3-D mammography. It is also certified as a Center of Excellence in Minimally Invasive Gynecology by the American Association of Gynecology Laparoscopist (AAGL). ALGH operates two cystic fibrosis care centers; one for adults and one for children. The hospital also operates specialized down syndrome centers, for adults and children with Down syndrome.

The hospital is accredited for Clinical Pastoral Education by the Council for Higher Education Accreditation.

== Campus ==
The hospital is certified by the Leadership in Energy and Environmental Design (LEED) to the gold standard.

== Advocate Health Care ==
Advocate Lutheran General Hospital is part of Downers Grove-based Advocate Health Care, which is the largest health care provider in Illinois and the largest accountable care organization in the US. With more than 25,000 employees and 4,600 affiliated physicians, Advocate Health Care operates 10 acute care hospitals, including two children's hospitals and a specialty hospital for extended care needs, three large medical groups, and comprehensive home health and hospice services. Advocate Health Care is a not-for-profit, faith-based organization related to both the Evangelical Lutheran Church in America and the United Church of Christ.

== Graduate medical education ==
Advocate Lutheran General Hospital operates a number of residency training and fellowship programs for newly graduated physicians. The residencies train physicians specializing in orthopedic surgery, internal medicine, family medicine, obstetrics and gynecology, pediatrics, and psychiatry. All residency programs are accredited by the Accreditation Council for Graduate Medical Education (ACGME). The fellowships train physicians specializing in adult critical care, cardiology, gastroenterology, hematology/oncology, neonatal-perinatal medicine, pediatric critical care, sports medicine, colorectal surgery, and gynecologic surgery. Each year, Advocate Lutheran General Hospital trains 900+ medical students, 200+ residents, and 32 fellows.

The hospital also provides graduate training for pharmacists, through a program accredited by the American Society of Health-System Pharmacists.

== Research ==
Research is conducted via the Russell Center for Research and Innovation, the Advocate Center for Pediatric Research, and the Loeber Research Laboratory.

== See also ==
- Advocate Children's Hospital
- Advocate Good Samaritan Hospital
- Advocate Sherman Hospital
