= Royal Masonic Hospital =

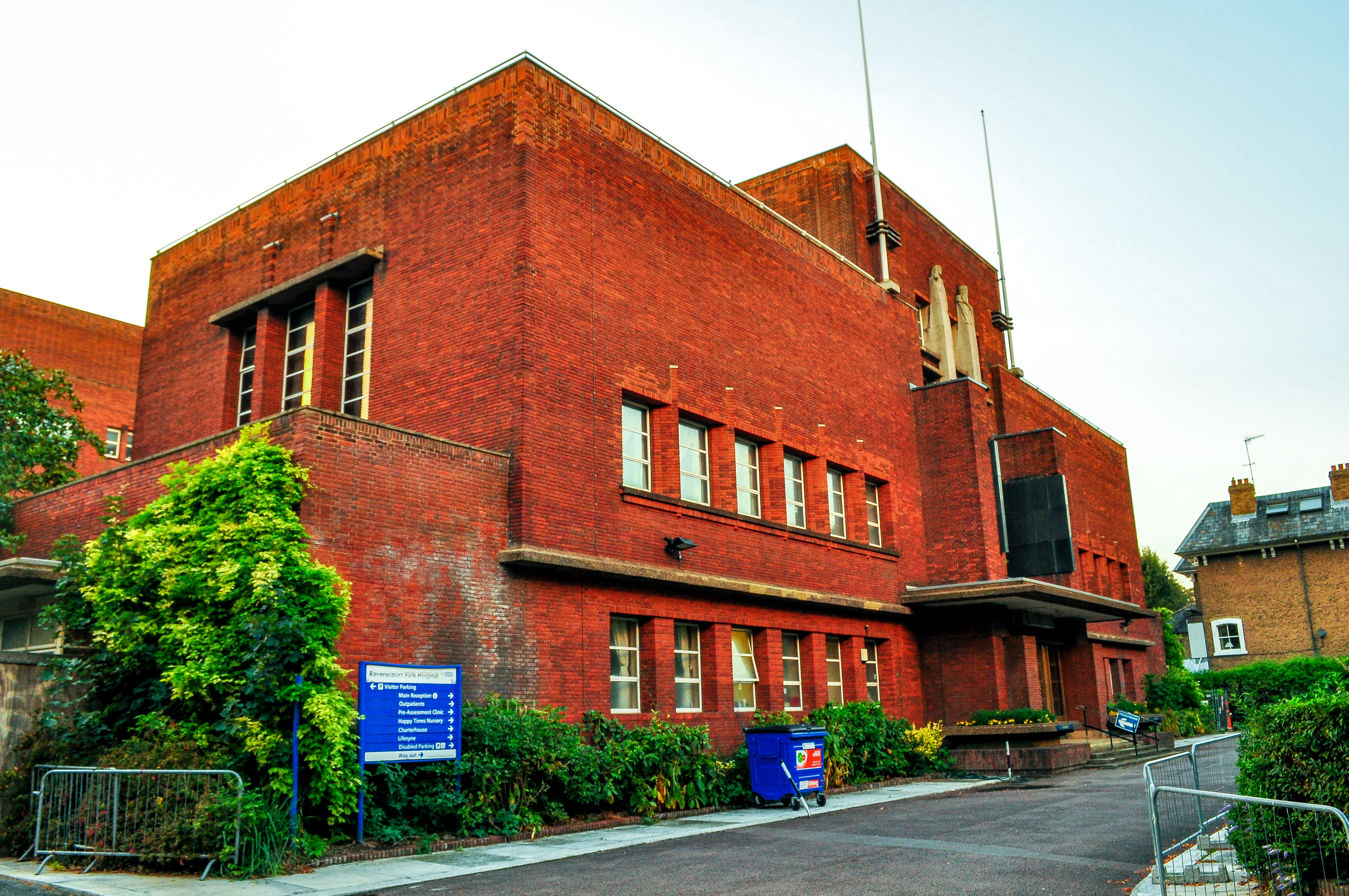
- Royal Masonic Hospital

- Location within Hammersmith and Fulham

Geography
- Location: Ravenscourt Park, London, England, United Kingdom
- Coordinates: 51.496333°N 0.240646°W

Organisation
- Care system: Private
- Affiliated university: None
- Patron: None

Services
- Emergency department: No Accident & Emergency

Helipads
- Helipad: No

History
- Founded: 1920
- Closed: 2006

Links
- Lists: Hospitals in England

The Royal Masonic Hospital was a hospital in the Ravenscourt Park area of Hammersmith, west London, built and opened in 1933. The Grade II* listed building became the Ravenscourt Park Hospital in 2002, but this closed in 2006. As of May 2015 the hospital was expected to reopen in 2017 as the 150-bed London International Hospital, a centre for medical tourism. However, London International Hospital Limited commenced winding up proceedings on 30 March 2017, and was dissolved on 28 March 2018, owing £15 million to the Imperial College Healthcare Trust.

== History ==
The Freemasons' War Hospital, was opened by London Freemasons with support from lodges in Gloucestershire (Royal York Lodge, Stroud) and around England during the First World War in Fulham Road, London, in the premises of the former Chelsea Hospital for Women, and treated over 4,000 servicemen by the end of the war. In 1920 it opened as the Freemason's Hospital and Nursing Home, but outgrew its premises. The new hospital was opened by King George V and Queen Mary, and the king gave permission for the hospital to be renamed as the Royal Masonic Hospital.

The hospital was re-built in 1933. The architect was Thomas S. Tait, and the building was awarded the RIBA Gold Medal for the best building of the year in 1933. The red-brick building "combines straight lines with spectacular curved balconies", and has large concrete relief figures of Hebe and Aesculapius by sculptor Gilbert Bayes. The adjacent nurses' home is grade II listed. It was re-opened by King George V.

The hospital treated over 8,600 servicemen during the Second World War (including fighter pilots Eric Lock and Richard Hillary, who describes it in his book The Last Enemy) and remained independent when the National Health Service was founded in 1948. The Wakefield Wing, with new physiotherapy and pathology departments, accommodation for nurses, and a chapel, was opened in 1958, and a new surgical wing in 1976. From 1977 it began to accept paying non-Mason patients, but financial pressures led to its closure and acquisition in 1992 by the Hammersmith Hospitals NHS Trust, not without controversy.

The hospital reopened in 2002 as the Ravenscourt Park Hospital within the NHS, but closed again in 2006.

In 2012 it was stated that the building was being redeveloped by the C & C Alpha Group to house the London International Hospital, which would specialise in cancer and diseases of the heart and brain. In 2015 it was acquired by VPS Healthcare who proposed to reopen it as the 150-bed London International Hospital in 2017, which would be "the centre for tourists to travel to the capital city for state-of-the-art medical care".

London International Hospital Limited terminated the remaining site service contracts and returned the site to Imperial College Healthcare Trust on 4 July 2016; it commenced winding up proceedings on 30 March 2017, and was dissolved on 28 March 2018, owing £15 million to the Trust.

== See also ==
- Epworth Freemasons Hospital
- Texas Scottish Rite Hospital for Children, Dallas, Texas, USA
- Shriners Hospital for Children – Canada
