= Hemostatic Powder Spray TC-325 =

- Other names: Hemospray, TC-325

Hemostatic Powder Spray TC-325 (Hemospray or TC-325) is an inert, highly absorptive mineral agent which is used for the treatment of gastrointestinal bleeding. Applied during endoscopy to bleeding lesions, TC-325 is derived from bentonite, and is used to achieve hemostasis (control of bleeding) by absorbing water and creating a barrier that leads to mechanical tamponade (pressure) and concentration of clotting factors, resulting in enhanced coagulation (clotting of blood). TC-325 was approved for gastrointestinal bleeding from causes other than gastric or esophageal varices (e.g., nonvariceal bleeding). TC-325 results in immediate control of bleeding in 91–93% of cases. Technical success has gradually increased between 2011 and 2019, which may be due to device improvements or physician familiarity with the application of TC-325.

== History ==
Hemostatic Powder Spray TC-325 was approved by the United States Food and Drug Administration in 2018 for gastrointestinal bleeding. Technical success has gradually increased between 2011 and 2019, which may be due to device improvements or physician familiarity with the application of TC-325.

== Uses ==
TC-325 is recommended for temporary control of gastrointestinal bleeding when other treatments are ineffective or not available. TC-325 may also be used for massive bleeding with poor visualization or diffuse bleeding due to cancer.

The device is not FDA approved for the treatment of gastroesophageal variceal bleeding. However, TC-325 is 90.4% effective in achieving initial hemostasis in variceal bleeding, and its use was associated with a 4.2% rate of rebleeding. TC-325 use for variceal bleeding is safe.

== Efficacy ==
TC-325 is 91–93% effective in achieving initial control of bleeding, but does not prevent re-bleeding from occurring. Rebleeding is most likely to occur if the initial bleed was brisk (spurting) or hypotension was present.

== Risks ==
Risks of TC-325 use include failure to control bleeding, gastrointestinal perforation, bowel obstruction, or malfunction of device or delivery system. If TC-325 is used for the control of bleeding at the site of a sphincterotomy or ampullary resection, there is a risk of biliary obstruction. Additional risks include allergy to the TC-325 powder. The overall rate of adverse events to TC-325 is 0.7%.
