= Midwestern University =

Private graduate university in Illinois and Arizona, US

- Former names: American College of Osteopathic Medicine and Surgery; Chicago College of Osteopathy
- Motto: Educating Tomorrow's Healthcare Team
- Type: Private medical and professional school
- Established: 1900; 126 years ago
- Endowment: $916.6 million (2025)
- President: Joshua C. Baker
- Faculty: 258 (Downers Grove); 377 (Glendale)
- Students: 2,594 (Downers Grove); 3,807 (Glendale)
- Location: Downers Grove, Illinois; Glendale, Arizona, United States
- Campus: Downers Grove, 105 acres (42 ha); Glendale, 156 acres (63 ha); Suburban
- Language: English
- Colors: Dark blue, dark warm grey, light warm grey
- Website: www.midwestern.edu
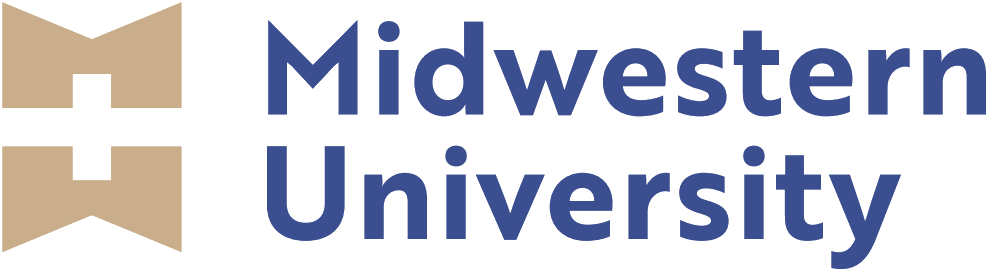

Midwestern University (MWU) is a private graduate university specializing in the health sciences, with campuses in Downers Grove, Illinois, and Glendale, Arizona, United States. During the 2025–26 academic year, the university enrolled 6,401 students, including 2,594 at the Downers Grove campus and 3,807 at the Glendale campus.

Founded in 1900 as the American College of Osteopathic Medicine and Surgery, the university's founding college is now the Chicago College of Osteopathic Medicine (CCOM), the fourth-oldest active medical school in Illinois. The institution expanded to include other health-professions programs, which were united under the name Midwestern University in 1993. The university established its Glendale campus in 1995. Its two osteopathic medical schools are CCOM in Illinois and the Arizona College of Osteopathic Medicine (AZCOM) in Arizona.

Midwestern University is institutionally accredited by the Higher Learning Commission. CCOM and AZCOM are accredited by the Commission on Osteopathic College Accreditation.

== History ==
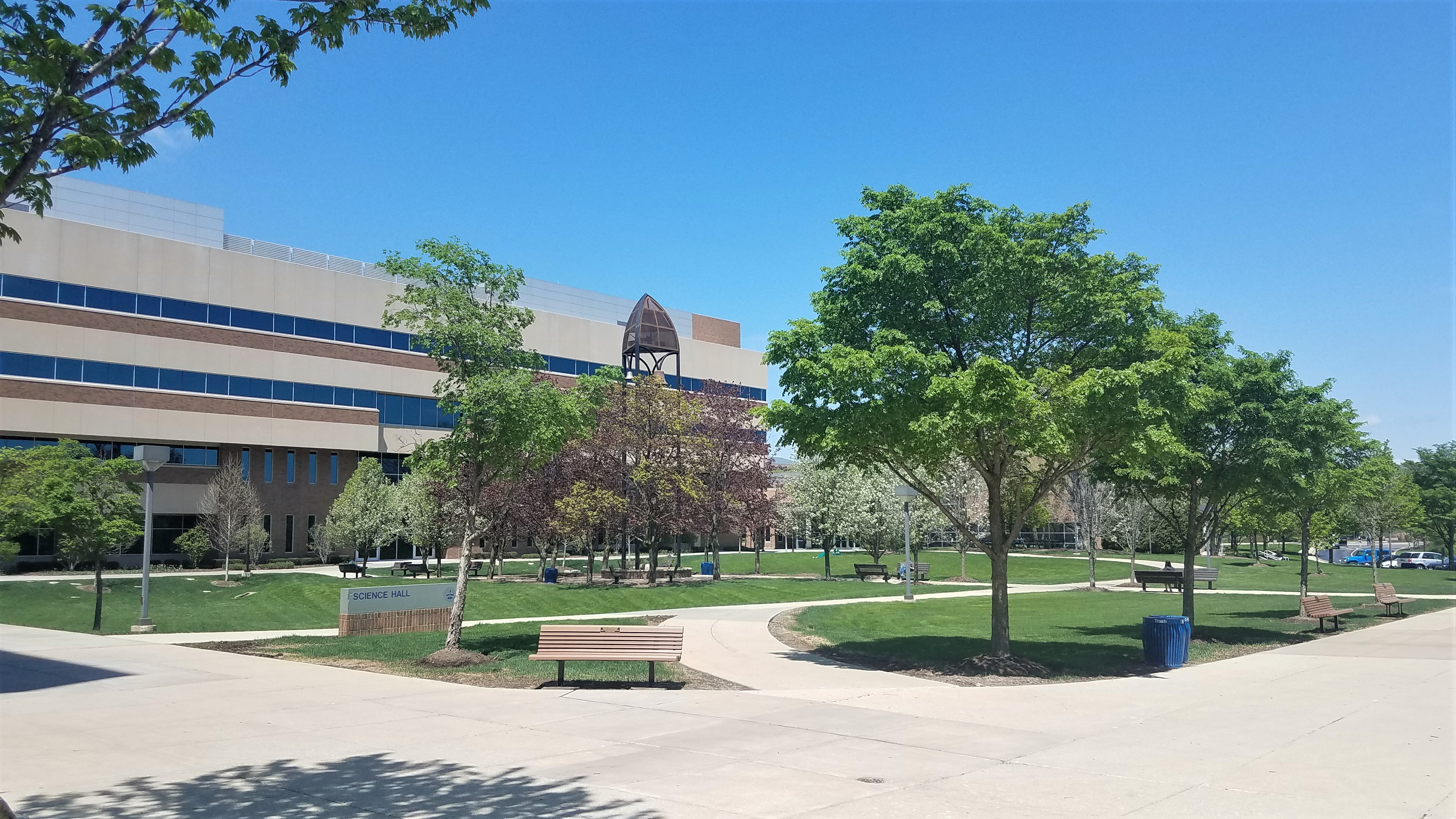
Cardinal Hall on the Downers Grove campus

Midwestern University was founded in 1900 as the American College of Osteopathic Medicine and Surgery by J. Martin Littlejohn and his brothers. The institution was incorporated in Chicago as a nonprofit school for the training of osteopathic physicians. It was originally located on Washington Boulevard and later moved to Hyde Park. In 1913, the school became known as the Chicago College of Osteopathy and was later renamed the Chicago College of Osteopathic Medicine.

In 1986, CCOM moved from Hyde Park to the university's campus in the western Chicago suburb of Downers Grove, Illinois. The College of Pharmacy began in 1991, followed by the College of Health Sciences in 1992. In 1993, the board of trustees approved a common educational mission for the institution, and the Midwestern University name was adopted. The College of Dental Medicine–Illinois opened in 2009, the Chicago College of Optometry in 2014, and the College of Graduate Studies in 2018.

The Glendale, Arizona campus was founded in 1995 after the board of trustees approved the purchase of land and construction of the new campus. The Arizona College of Osteopathic Medicine also began in 1995. The College of Health Sciences followed in 1996 and the College of Pharmacy–Glendale in 1998. The College of Dental Medicine–Arizona was established in 2006, the Arizona College of Optometry in 2008, the College of Veterinary Medicine in 2012, the College of Graduate Studies in 2018, and the Arizona College of Podiatric Medicine in 2020.

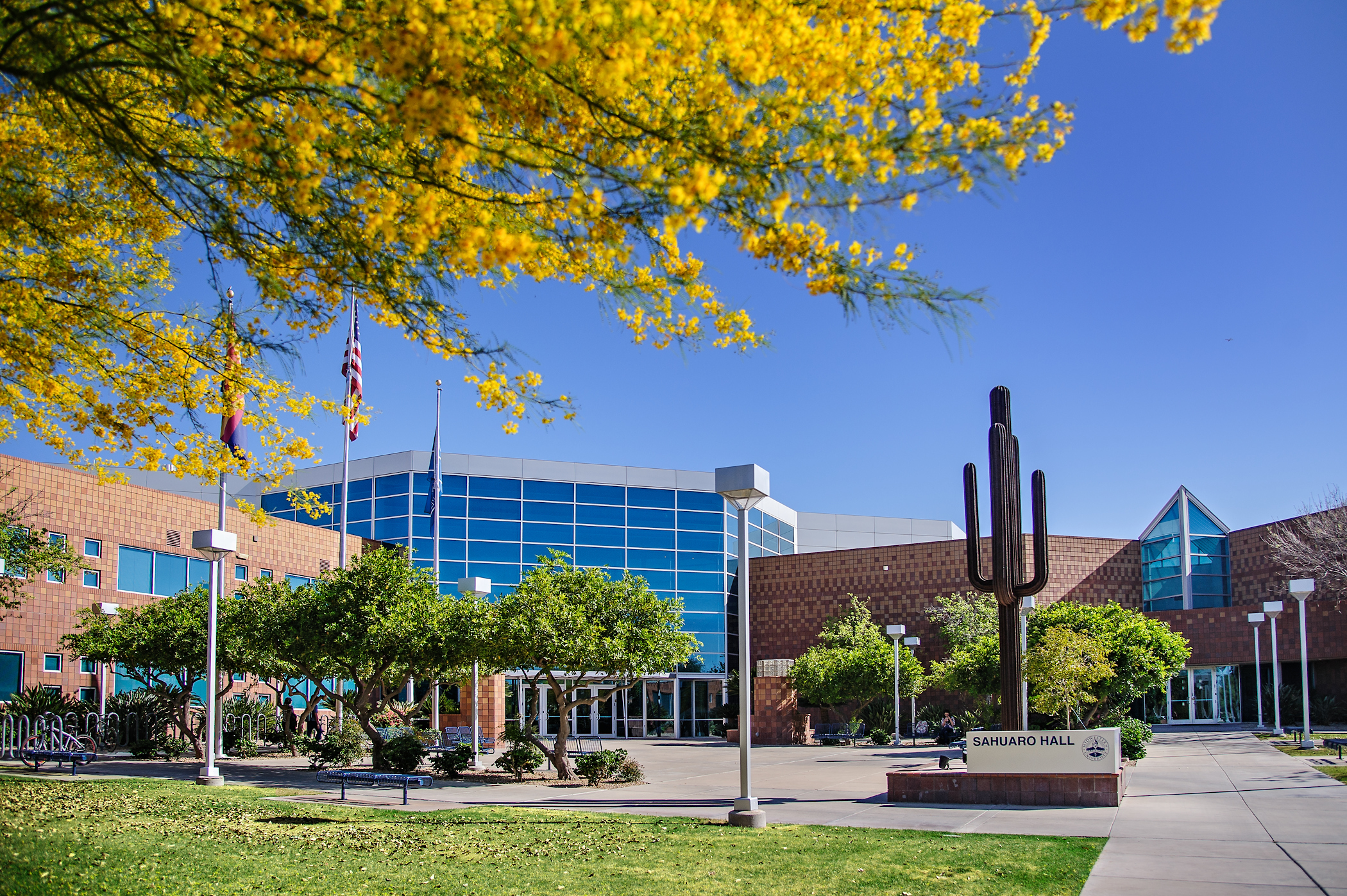
Sahauro Hall on the Glendale campus

The university subsequently opened the Midwestern University Multispecialty Clinic in Downers Grove in 2013.

The College of Veterinary Medicine was established at the Glendale campus in 2012. Its development included a veterinary teaching hospital, a large-animal teaching facility, and classroom facilities. The college became the first veterinary medical school in Arizona.

=== Recent history ===
Kathleen H. Goeppinger joined Midwestern University's board of trustees in 1985 and became president and chief executive officer in 1995. She retired in 2025 after 30 years as president. During her presidency, enrollment grew from fewer than 900 students to nearly 7,000 across the university's two campuses.

Joshua C. Baker was appointed interim president and CEO effective May 20, 2025, and was appointed president and CEO permanently effective September 11, 2025. At the time of Baker's permanent appointment, the university stated that it had more than $555 million in planned construction projects in various stages of development across the two campuses, including approximately $286 million in Illinois and $270 million in Arizona.

Midwestern also pursued plans for a second veterinary medical school, the proposed Chicago College of Veterinary Medicine, at the Downers Grove campus. In June 2026, the university halted development of the college and paused its accreditation process.

== Academics and accreditation ==
Midwestern University offers graduate and professional programs in the health sciences. The university's programs include osteopathic medicine, dentistry, pharmacy, optometry, veterinary medicine, podiatric medicine, clinical psychology, nursing, physical therapy, occupational therapy, physician assistant studies, speech-language pathology, biomedical sciences, and other health-related fields.

Doctoral degree programs include:

- Doctor of Osteopathic Medicine
- Doctor of Dental Medicine
- Doctor of Nurse Anesthesia Practice
- Doctor of Occupational Therapy
- Doctor of Pharmacy
- Doctor of Physical Therapy
- Doctor of Podiatric Medicine
- Doctor of Psychology
- Doctor of Optometry
- Doctor of Veterinary Medicine
- Doctor of Nursing Practice

The university also offers master's degree programs, including programs in biomedical sciences, medical sciences, nurse anesthesia, occupational therapy, public health, nursing, speech-language pathology, and cardiovascular science.

=== Tuition and student debt ===
For the 2004–05 academic year, AZCOM tuition was $34,099 for both residents and nonresidents, compared with averages of $30,192 for residents and $31,101 for nonresidents at private osteopathic medical schools. CCOM tuition was $29,755 for Illinois residents and $35,391 for nonresidents.

For the 2026–27 academic year, annual tuition for the Doctor of Osteopathic Medicine program was $85,232 at CCOM and $82,672 at AZCOM. Required student-services and disability-insurance fees brought annual tuition and required fees to $86,780 at CCOM and $84,222 at AZCOM.

The university reported average indebtedness of $350,849 among 2025 CCOM graduates and $315,873 among 2025 AZCOM graduates.

=== Research ===
Midwestern University conducts research in the biomedical and health sciences. Research areas include pharmacology, physiology, anatomy, and environmental toxicology. Some university research has been organized around the One Health concept, which considers connections among human, animal, and environmental health.

According to the National Center for Science and Engineering Statistics' Higher Education Research and Development Survey, Midwestern reported $13.632 million in research and development expenditures in fiscal year 2024. Of that amount, $3.227 million came from federal sources and $10.030 million from institutional funds. Most of the reported expenditures were in the life sciences.

== Campuses ==
The colleges at the two campuses, their founding years, and their principal institutional or professional accreditors are summarized below.

Campus	College	Founded	Accreditation
Downers Grove	Midwestern University	1900	Higher Learning Commission
Downers Grove	College of Dental Medicine–Illinois	2009	Commission on Dental Accreditation
Downers Grove	College of Health Sciences	1992	Multiple programmatic accreditors
Downers Grove	Chicago College of Optometry	2014	Accreditation Council on Optometric Education
Downers Grove	Chicago College of Osteopathic Medicine	1900	Commission on Osteopathic College Accreditation
Downers Grove	College of Pharmacy, Downers Grove	1991	Accreditation Council for Pharmacy Education
Downers Grove	College of Graduate Studies	2018	Higher Learning Commission
Glendale	College of Dental Medicine–Arizona	2006	Commission on Dental Accreditation
Glendale	College of Health Sciences	1996	Multiple programmatic accreditors
Glendale	Arizona College of Optometry	2008	Accreditation Council on Optometric Education
Glendale	Arizona College of Osteopathic Medicine	1995	Commission on Osteopathic College Accreditation
Glendale	College of Pharmacy–Glendale	1998	Accreditation Council for Pharmacy Education
Glendale	College of Veterinary Medicine	2012	American Veterinary Medical Association Council on Education
Glendale	College of Graduate Studies	2018	Higher Learning Commission
Glendale	Arizona College of Podiatric Medicine	2020	Council on Podiatric Medical Education

=== Downers Grove, Illinois ===
The Downers Grove campus is located in suburban DuPage County, Illinois, approximately 25 miles (40 km) west of downtown Chicago. The university describes the campus as occupying 105 acres (42 ha). It includes academic and laboratory buildings, student housing, recreation facilities, and other student services.

=== Glendale, Arizona ===
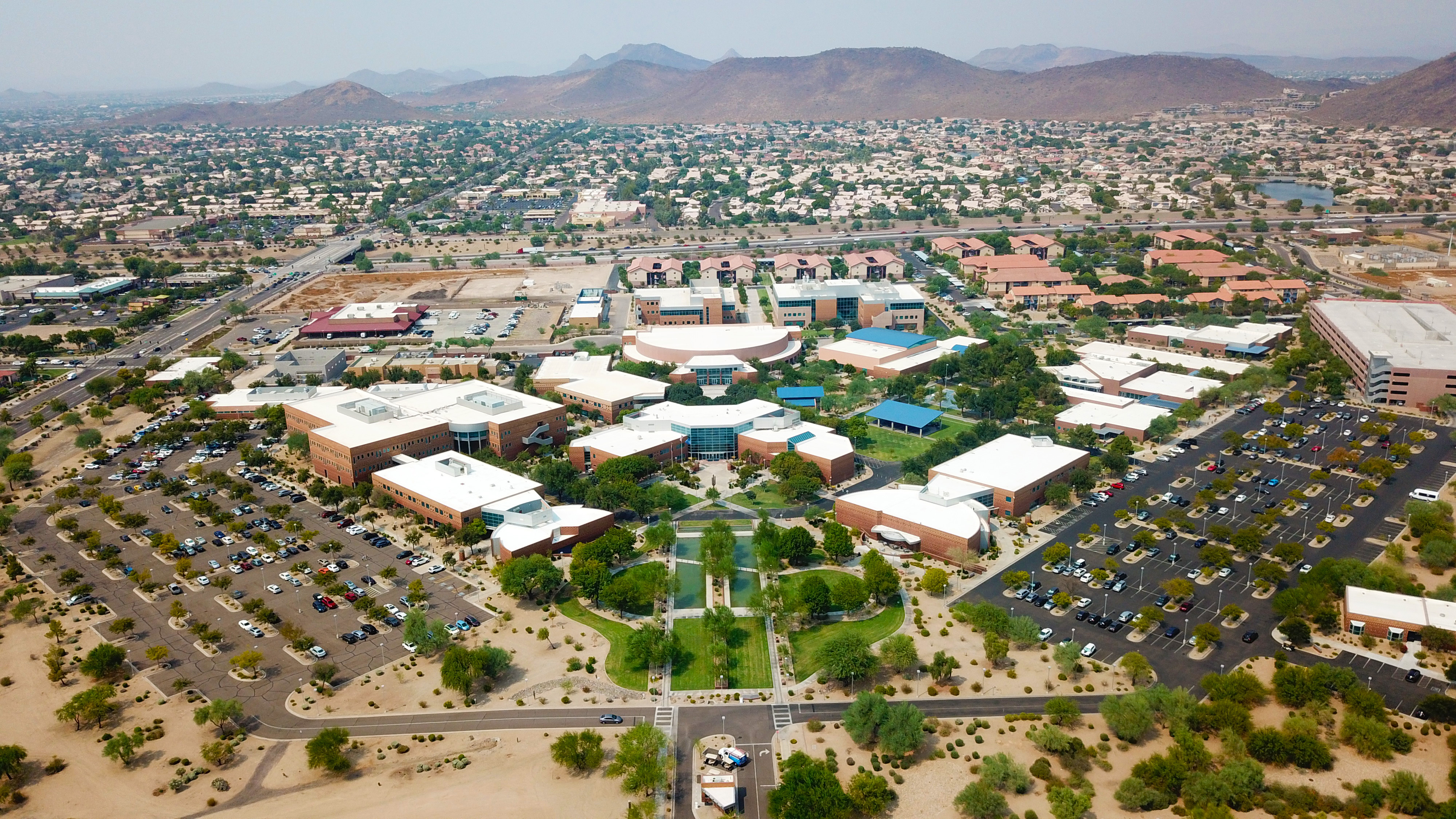
Aerial view of the Glendale campus

The Glendale campus is located approximately 15 miles (24 km) northwest of downtown Phoenix. The university describes the campus as occupying 156 acres (63 ha). It includes academic and research facilities, student housing, recreation facilities, and university-operated clinics.

== Patient care ==
Midwestern University operates teaching clinics associated with its academic programs at both campuses. The Downers Grove facilities include the Multispecialty Clinic, with services in family medicine, dentistry, optometry, physical therapy, and speech-language pathology. The Glendale campus operates clinical facilities in medicine, dentistry, optometry, therapy, and veterinary medicine.

The Glendale Animal Health Institute includes veterinary clinical facilities for companion animals and large animals as well as diagnostic pathology services.

== Students ==
During the 2025–26 academic year, Midwestern University reported 6,401 students: 2,594 at the Downers Grove campus and 3,807 at the Glendale campus.

In 2020–21, 2,980 students attended the Downers Grove campus; 63% were female, 37% male, 58% White, 27% Asian, 6% Hispanic or Latino, and 2% Black or African American. At the Glendale campus, 3,927 students attended; 57% were female, 43% male, 59% White, 17% Asian, 10% Hispanic or Latino, and 3% Black or African American.

== Notable people ==
- Clinton E. Adams – osteopathic physician and former president and CEO of Rocky Vista University
- Ivan Edwards – physician, pastor, and military flight surgeon
- Victor Lindlahr – physician, radio presenter, and health-food writer
- Joseph Mercola – osteopathic physician and Internet businessman
- Rudy Moise – physician, lawyer, and politician
- Douglas J. Robb – osteopathic physician and retired United States Air Force lieutenant general
- Richard Scheuring – physician and NASA flight surgeon
- Emily Temple-Wood – physician and 2016 Wikimedian of the Year
- James N. Weinstein – physician and healthcare executive
- Sheil Shukla – physician and author
- George Klopfer – physician
- Walter Prozialeck – pharmacologist and former chair of the Department of Pharmacology at CCOM

== See also ==
- List of dental schools in the United States
- List of medical schools in the United States
- List of optometry schools
- List of pharmacy schools in the United States
- List of osteopathic colleges
- Osteopathic medicine in the United States
