= List of Loyola University Chicago people =

Here follows a list of notable people of Loyola University Chicago:

== Academia ==
=== Prominent professors ===
- Robert R. Jensen
- Pamela L. Caughie
- Vincent A. Mahler
- David Schweickart
- John Allen Williams
- Stephen Richard Doty

=== Alumni ===
- Lawrence Biondi, former President of Saint Louis University
- Margaret Callahan, Dean of the College of Nursing at Marquette University
- Richard A. Cosier, Dean of the Krannert School of Management at Purdue University
- DeRionne P. Pollard, President of Nevada State University
- Rona M. Fields, psychologist
- Christian Gostečnik, dean of Faculty of Theology of Ljubljana
- Marsha Linehan, psychologist who pioneered suicide research and creator of dialectical behavior therapy
- Vincent A. Mahler, prominent political scientist
- J. Dennis O'Connor, former Chancellor of University of Pittsburgh
- Robert A Wild, S.J., President of Marquette University
- Sho Yano, child prodigy
- Scott Yenor, professor at Boise State University

== Business ==
=== Alumni ===
- Brenda C. Barnes, chairman and CEO, Sara Lee Corporation; first female CEO of Pepsi Cola
- Frank Considine, former CEO of American National Can Corporation
- Lori Greiner, inventor, investor, entrepreneur, and television personality
- Joseph Grendys, CEO of Koch Foods
- Andrew T. Berlin, CEO of Berlin Packaging
- George Halas, Jr., former president of the Chicago Bears
- Christopher Hurn, entrepreneur who works primarily in the field of small business lending
- Joseph M. Juran, quality expert
- Stephen McGowan, former CFO of Sun Microsystems
- James Mulvaney, president of the United States National Bank of San Diego and president of the San Diego Padres (PCL)
- Jennifer N. Pritzker, billionaire, and former co-owner of The Marmon Group, member of the Pritzker family
- Michael R. Quinlan, McDonald's Corporation Chairman
- Todd Ricketts, co-owner of Chicago Cubs
- John E. Rooney, CEO of US Cellular
- Thomas Schoewe, CFO of Wal-Mart Stores, Inc.
- William Scholl, founder of Dr. Scholl's footcare
- Mamie Till, activist, mother of Emmett Till
- John York, co-owner of the San Francisco 49ers

== Entertainment ==
=== Alumni ===
- Leslie David Baker, actor (The Office)
- Ian Brennan, creator of Glee
- L. Scott Caldwell, Tony Award-winning actress
- Karla DeVito, singer
- Jerry Lorenzo, fashion designer
- David Draiman, lead singer of Disturbed
- Wendolly Esparza, Nuestra Belleza Mexico 2014
- Mary Gross, actress, comedian
- Richard Kiley, Emmy-winning actor, singer and narrator (attended)
- Tim McCoy, cowboy actor
- Jennifer Morrison, actress (House M.D., Once Upon a Time)
- Joel Murray, actor
- Bob Newhart, Peabody Award-winning actor and comedian, The Bob Newhart Show and Newhart
- Jim O'Heir, actor (Parks and Recreation)
- David Pasquesi, actor
- Bill Rancic, television personality
- Sosay, professional wrestler
- Meredith Marks, television personality, The Real Housewives of Salt Lake City

== Government and politics ==
=== Alumni ===
==== Activists ====
- Jerry Harkness, former professional basketball player and civil rights activist
- Jerome G. Miller, advocate for alternatives to incarceration and the deinstitutionalization of persons with developmental disabilities
- Mary Morello, progressive activist
- Michael Pfleger, Roman Catholic priest and social activist

==== Attorneys ====
- Anita Alvarez, former Cook County State's Attorney
- Richard A. Devine, former Cook County State's Attorney
- Neil F. Hartigan, former Illinois Attorney General, candidate for Governor, former Lt. Governor
- Donald Lee Hollowell, civil rights attorney
- Lisa Madigan, Illinois Attorney General
- Dan K. Webb, Chairman of Winston & Strawn LLP

==== Cabinet members ====
- William M. Daley, President Obama's White House Chief of Staff and former United States Secretary of Commerce under President Bill Clinton
- Susan Ralston, former White House Deputy Chief of Staff and Senior Advisor

==== Judges ====
- William Joseph Campbell, chief judge, United States District Court for the Northern District of Illinois
- Ruben Castillo, judge, United States District Court for the Northern District of Illinois
- David H. Coar, judge, United States District Court for the Northern District of Illinois
- Sanjay Tailor, judge, Supreme Court of Illinois
- Elizabeth Rochford, judge, Supreme Court of Illinois
- John W. Darrah, judge, United States District Court for the Northern District of Illinois
- Thomas R. Fitzgerald, 1st District Justice Supreme Court of Illinois
- Virginia Mary Kendall, judge, United States District Court for the Northern District of Illinois
- Howard Thomas Markey, the first Chief Justice of the United States Court of Appeals for the Federal Circuit
- Peg McDonnell Breslin, member of the Illinois House of Representatives from 1977 to 1991 and the first woman elected to the Illinois Appellate Court outside of Cook County.
- Mary Ann G. McMorrow, former Chief Justice of the Supreme Court of Illinois
- Mary Jane Theis, judge, Supreme Court of Illinois
- Robert R. Thomas, current Chief Justice of the Supreme Court of Illinois

==== Legislators ====
- Harry P. Beam, former U.S. Congressman
- Charles A. Boyle, former U.S. Congressman
- Emmet Byrne, former U.S. Congressman
- Fred Crespo, member of Illinois House of Representatives
- Daniel Cronin, former Illinois State Senator
- John Cullerton, current Illinois State Senator; President of Illinois State Senate
- Tom Dart, Cook County Sheriff and former Illinois State Representative
- Ed Derwinski, former U.S. Congressman, 1st United States Secretary of Veterans Affairs
- Michael Dvorak, former Indiana state representative and St. Joseph County, Indiana Prosecutor
- Samuel Epstein, Illinois state representative, lawyer, and physician
- John N. Erlenborn, former U.S. Congressman
- John G. Fary, former U.S. Congressman
- Edward Rowan Finnegan, former U.S. Congressman
- Michael Patrick Flanagan, former U.S. Congressman
- La Shawn Ford, current member of Illinois House of Representatives
- John J. Gorman, former U.S. Congressman
- Mary Jeanne Hallstrom, former member of Illinois House of Representatives
- Shawn Hamerlinck, former Iowa State Senator
- Henry Hyde, former U.S. Congressman
- Daniel Hynes, current Illinois State Comptroller
- James T. Igoe, former U.S. Congressman
- Peter C. Knudson, former Utah State Senator
- Gary LaPaille, former Illinois State Senator
- Michael Madigan, former Speaker of the Illinois House of Representatives and chairman of the Democratic Party of Illinois
- William T. Murphy, former U.S. Congressman
- Kevin Olickal, current Illinois State Representative
- Thomas L. Owens, former U.S. Congressman
- Lillian Piotrowski, former Illinois State Representative
- Mike Quigley, current U.S. Congressman
- Trey Radel, former U.S. Congressman
- Christine Radogno, former Illinois State Senator; former Republican Minority Leader in the Illinois State Senate
- Daniel J. Ronan, former U.S. Congressman
- Dan Rostenkowski, former U.S. Congressman
- Martin Sandoval, current Illinois State Senator
- Ira Silverstein, current Illinois State Senator
- James M. Slattery, former U.S. Senator
- Rudolph G. Tenerowicz, former U.S. Congressman
- Donne Trotter, former Illinois State Senator
- Arthur Wilhelmi, former Illinois State Senator
- Corinne Wood, former Illinois Lieutenant Governor

==== Other ====
- Lieutenant General Joseph Carroll, founding director of Defense Intelligence Agency and the Air Force Office of Special Investigations
- Nina Kasniunas, Political scientist, author, and professor
- Major General Enrique Méndez, Jr., Army Deputy Surgeon General
- Maria Pappas, Cook County Treasurer (1998–present); earned her Ph.D. in psychology from Loyola in 1976
- Tom Philpott, former professor of history at the University of Texas and researcher into child prostitution
- Todd Ricketts, Finance Chairman of the Republican National Committee since January 31, 2018
- Edith S. Sampson, US delegate to the United Nations

== Journalism ==
=== Alumni ===
- Susan Candiotti, CNN correspondent
- Philip Caputo, author, Pulitzer Prize-winning journalist
- Susan Carlson, WBBM-TV Chicago news anchor
- Shams Charania, sports journalist covering the NBA for The Athletic and Stadium
- Robert Jordan, WGN-TV weekend news anchor
- Christina Kahrl, co-founder of Baseball Prospectus, writer for ESPN.com
- Ernie Manouse, TV anchor and producer, PBS
- Bill Plante, CBS White House correspondent
- Jim Quinlan, credited with the story and screenplay for Michael
- Victoria Recano, news anchor
- Mercedes Soler, news anchor for Univision and CNN en Español
- Patricia Thompson, TV and film producer

== Literature ==
=== Alumni ===
- Sandra Cisneros (b. 1954), author, poet, teacher
- Stuart Dybek, author
- James McManus, author
- John R. Powers, novelist and playwright; author of Do Black Patent Leather Shoes Really Reflect Up?
- Daniel Quinn, author
- Dinesh Sharma, author
- Bill Zehme, author

== Medical ==
=== Alumni ===
- John L. Keeley Sr., Chicago surgeon who was personal physician to two Chicago cardinals
- Bruce Lerman, cardiologist; Chief of the Division of Cardiology and Director of the Cardiac Electrophysiology Laboratory at Weill Cornell Medicine and the New York Presbyterian Hospital
- Charlie Pechous, Major League Baseball player and physician

== Religion ==
- Mark McIntosh, Professor of Christian Spirituality
- Sister Jean Dolores Schmidt, former chaplain of the men's basketball team who became a major media celebrity during the team's 2018 Final Four run

=== Alumni ===
- Daniel Coughlin, chaplain of the United States House of Representatives
- Norman Geisler, president of Southern Evangelical Seminary in Charlotte, North Carolina
- Roger William Gries, auxiliary bishop of Cleveland
- Ronald A. Hicks, Archbishop-elect of New York
- Daniel A. Lord, Catholic writer
- Anthony Petro Mayalla, Archbishop of the Roman Catholic Archdiocese of Mwanza
- Vincent Nichols, Archbishop of Westminster and ‘Primate of England and Wales’ (see Archbishop of Westminster for explanation)
- Mar Awa Royel, Catholicos-Patriarch of the Assyrian Church of the East
- John George Vlazny, Archbishop of Portland, Oregon

== Sports ==
=== Alumni ===
- Lucas Bartlett, professional soccer player
- Elliot Collier, professional soccer player
- Clayton Custer, professional basketball player and coach
- Milton Doyle, professional basketball player
- Jack Dwan, former professional basketball player
- John Egan, basketball player
- Armando Favela, professional golfer
- Eric Gehrig, professional soccer player
- Jerry Harkness, former professional basketball player
- Alfredrick Hughes, former professional basketball player (1st round pick in 1985 NBA draft)
- Les Hunter, former professional basketball player
- Donte Ingram, professional basketball player.
- Thomas Jaeschke, professional and U.S. Olympic men's volleyball player
- Jeffrey Jendryk, professional and U.S. Olympic men’s volleyball player
- Jack Kerris, former professional basketball player
- Nick Kladis, former professional basketball player, part-owner of White Sox and St. Louis Cardinals
- Cameron Krutwig, professional basketball player
- LaRue Martin, former professional basketball player (# 1 pick in 1972 NBA draft)
- Andre Moore, former professional basketball player
- Mike Novak, former professional basketball player
- Tom O'Hara, former indoor mile world record holder, 1964 Olympian
- Mickey Rottner, former professional basketball player
- Vic Rouse, basketball player, made game-winning shot to give Loyola 1963 NCAA championship
- Lenny Sachs, Hall of Fame basketball coach
- Blake Schilb, professional basketball player
- Eddie Slowikowski, former NCAA All-American runner
- Andre Wakefield, former professional basketball player
- Phil Weintraub, Major League Baseball player
- Brian Wheeler, broadcaster for NBA's Portland Trail Blazers
