= Riverside Hospital =

Riverside Hospital may refer to:

== Hospitals ==
=== Canada ===
- Riverside Hospital of Ottawa, in Ontario

=== United States ===
- Riverside Methodist Hospital, in Columbus, Ohio
- Riverside Medical Center, in Kankakee, Illinois
- Riverside University Health System Medical Center, Moreno Valley, California
- Riverside Community Hospital, in Riverside, California
- Meadowlands Hospital Medical Center, formerly Riverside Hospital, in Secaucus, New Jersey

== Former hospitals ==
- Riverside Hospital, a former hospital on North Brother Island, New York
- Riverside Hospital, a former hospital in Jacksonville, Florida

== See also ==
- St. Vincent's Medical Center Riverside in Jacksonville, Florida
