= Philip Low =

Philip Low may refer to:

- Philip Low, a victim of the Duck Den murder
- Philip B. Low (1836–1912), American politician
- Philip Low (chemist) (1947–2026), American scientist
- Philip Low (neuroscientist) (born 1979), Canadian inventor
