= Słowikowski =

Słowikowski (feminine: Słowikowska) is a Polish surname. Notable people with the surname include:

- Eddie Slowikowski (born 1967), American middle-distance runner and speaker
- Mieczysław Zygfryd Słowikowski (1896–1989), Polish intelligence officer
- Przemysław Słowikowski (born 1993), Polish sprinter
- Veronika Slowikowska (born 1995), Canadian actress and comedian
