= General Robb =

General Robb may refer to:

- Douglas J. Robb (fl. 1970s–2010s), U.S. Air Force lieutenant general
- Frederick Robb (1858–1948), British Army major general
- William Robb (British Army officer) (1888–1961), British Army major general
