= Emily Temple =

Emily Temple may refer to:

- Emily Temple, Viscountess Palmerston (1787–1869)
- Emily Temple-Wood (born 1994), American Wikipedia editor
