= John Martin Littlejohn =

Anglo-American osteopath (1865–1947)

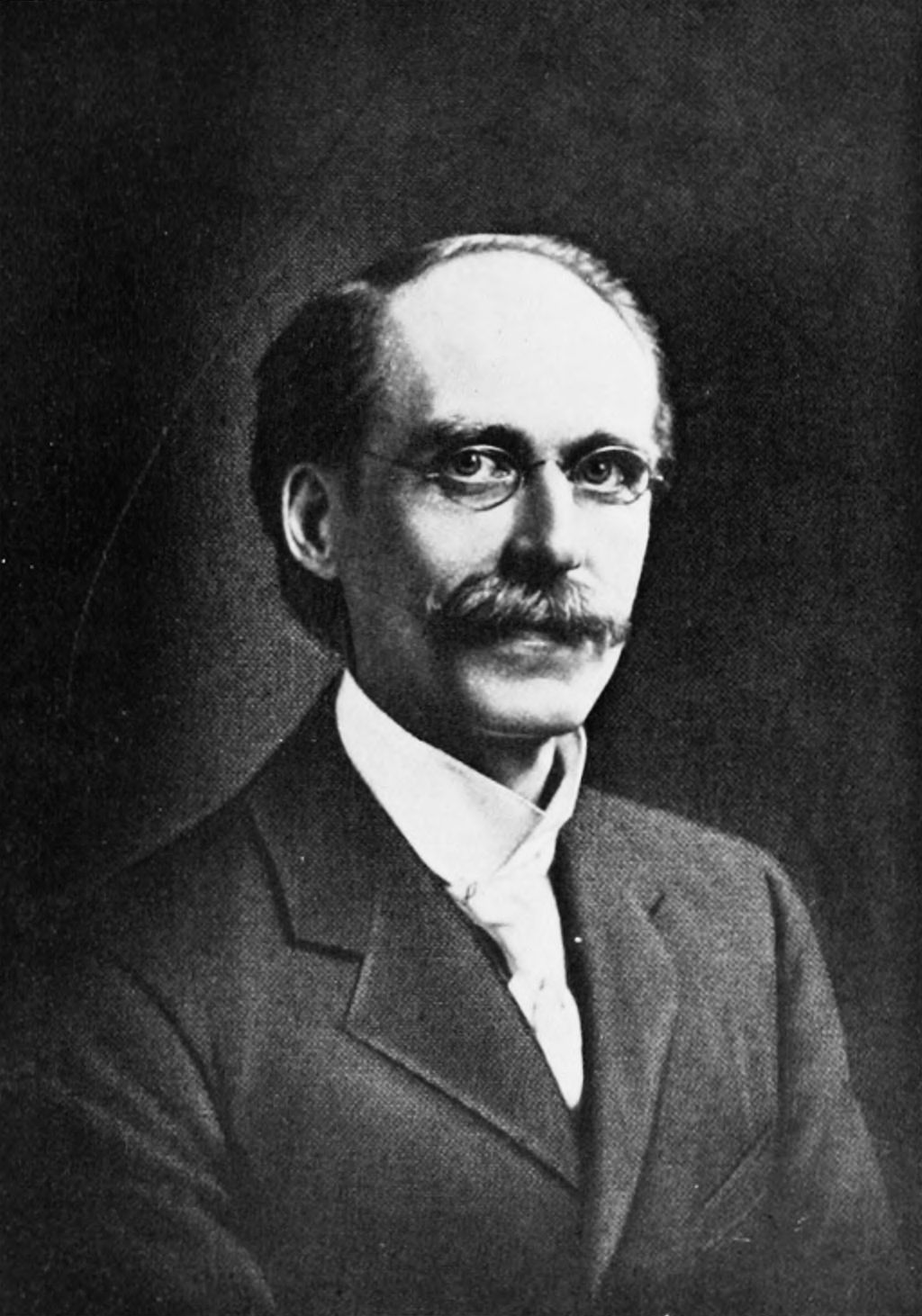
- J. Martin Littlejohn, c. 1912
- Born: 1865; Glasgow, Scotland
- Died: 8 December 1947; Bagger Hall, near London
- Occupations: Physician, osteopath
- Known for: Founding the Chicago College of Osteopathic Medicine and the British School of Osteopathy
- Spouse: Mabel Alice Thompson (m. 1900)
- Children: James Littlejohn

John Martin Littlejohn (1865 – 8 December 1947) was an Anglo-American physician and a student of Andrew Taylor Still, the founder of osteopathy. He founded the institution now known as the Chicago College of Osteopathic Medicine and later the British School of Osteopathy in London.

== Life ==
Littlejohn was born in 1865 in Glasgow, the son of the Reverend James Littlejohn. He first studied theology at the University of Glasgow and was ordained in 1886. He then studied law and medicine, completing his studies with an M.A., B.D. and LL.B. In 1892 the University of Glasgow awarded him a medal for his work in forensic medicine. That same year he emigrated to the United States, where he studied political science at Columbia University in New York from 1892 to 1893. He earned a Ph.D. in 1894 and an LL.D. the following year. From 1894 to 1897 he was president of Amity College in Iowa.

From 1898 to 1900, Littlejohn was professor of physiology and psychology and dean of the faculty at the American School of Osteopathy in Kirksville, where his brothers James and David also taught. In 1900 he qualified as a Doctor of Osteopathy, was admitted as an attorney in the United States, and became a member of the Royal Society of Literature. That year he and his brothers left Kirksville for Chicago, where they founded the American College of Osteopathic Medicine and Surgery — later renamed the Chicago College of Osteopathic Medicine and now part of Midwestern University. Littlejohn led the Chicago college until 1913, when a falling-out among the brothers led to its ownership passing to other osteopaths.

He also taught in Chicago as professor of physiology at the Hering Medical College — a homeopathic college that in 1903 absorbed the rival Dunham Medical College — and at the National Medical University (1908–1911), and from 1908 to 1910 was president of the Associated Colleges of Osteopathy. Returning to Britain in 1913, he founded the British School of Osteopathy in London in 1917, which he led as dean and managing director. He edited the Journal of the Science of Osteopathy and Osteopathy World, and published several books on osteopathy and physiology.

Littlejohn married Mabel Alice, née Thompson, in 1900. His son James Littlejohn (born 1905) also became a physician. He died at Bagger Hall, near London, on 8 December 1947.

== Work ==
Littlejohn is credited with developing the concept of the General Osteopathic Treatment (GOT) and with the mechanical model he termed the "Polygon of Forces" (distinct from the force polygon of physics).

== Selected publications ==
The following are German-language editions published by Jolandos (Pähl); English glosses are given in brackets:

- Zwei Schriften zur Osteopathie [Two Writings on Osteopathy]. Jolandos, Pähl 2008. ISBN 978-3-936679-47-2.
- Psychophysiologie (1899) [Psychophysiology]. Jolandos, Pähl 2009. ISBN 978-3-936679-44-1.
- Osteopathie erklärt: eine Abhandlung für Laien [Osteopathy Explained: A Treatise for Laypeople]. Jolandos, Pähl 2009. ISBN 978-3-936679-43-4.
- Das große Littlejohn-Kompendium: Ausgewählte Fachartikel; Abhandlungen zur Osteopathie 1899–1939 [The Great Littlejohn Compendium: Selected Articles; Treatises on Osteopathy 1899–1939]. Jolandos, Pähl 2009. ISBN 978-3-936679-56-4.
- Osteopathische Diagnostik und Therapie [Osteopathic Diagnosis and Therapy]. Jolandos, Pähl 2011. ISBN 978-3-936679-89-2.
