= Mercedes Soler =

Mercedes Soler may refer to:

- Mercedes Soler (actress), Mexican actress
- Mercedes Soler (journalist), American journalist
