= Richard Scheuring =

American osteopathic physician and a NASA flight surgeon

Richard Anthony Scheuring
- Education: Eastern Illinois University; Chicago College of Osteopathic Medicine; Wright State University
- Occupation: Flight surgeon
- Spouse: Michelle Scheuring
- Children: 5

Richard Anthony Scheuring is an American osteopathic physician and a NASA flight surgeon. Dr. Scheuring holds the rank of lieutenant colonel and was involved in the constellation program at the Lyndon B. Johnson Space Center.

== Education ==
Scheuring graduated from Midwestern University's Chicago College of Osteopathic Medicine in 1993 and completed a family medicine residency. After completing his first residency, Dr. Scheuring pursued additional training in aerospace medicine and preventive medicine at Wright State University.
