= Greg Christopher =

American college athletics administrator

Greg Christopher is the current athletic director for Xavier University. He was previously the athletic director at Bowling Green State University from 2006 to 2013. Christopher was an associate athletic director at Purdue University, joining the department in 1997.

Prior to college athletics, Christopher was in the media industry, with NBC, a radio station group and then serving as the executive director for the Society for Professional Journalists.

Christopher is a native of West Lafayette, Indiana and graduated from West Lafayette High School in 1984. He attended Miami University in Ohio and received a bachelor's degree in mass communication in 1988, and an MBA in 1991.
