= Victor Lindlahr =

American nutritionist

- Born: February 14, 1897
- Died: January 26, 1969 (aged 71); Miami Beach, Florida, U.S.
- Education: Doctor of Osteopathic Medicine
- Alma mater: Chicago College of Osteopathy
- Occupations: Radio presenter, writer
- Known for: You Are What You Eat (1940)
- Parent: Henry Lindlahr

Victor Hugo Lindlahr (February 14, 1897 – January 26, 1969) was an American radio presenter, health food writer, and osteopathic physician. From 1936 to 1953, he hosted Talks and Diet, a popular radio series about nutrition.

== Biography ==
In 1918, Lindlahr graduated from the Chicago College of Osteopathic Medicine. His father was the naturopath Henry Lindlahr.

In 1940, he wrote the book You Are What You Eat, one of the earliest texts of the health food movement in the United States, which sold over half a million copies. His book is also credited for popularizing the expression.

Between 1944 and 1953, Lindlahr endorsed the dietary supplement Serutan on the radio and television. Lindlahr has been described as a promoter of fad diets. He developed a low-carbohydrate diet which he called the Catabolic Diet. Nutritionist Frederick J. Stare included Lindlahr's Calorie Countdown in a list of books on nutritional quackery, which "ought not to be on anyone's shelves."

== Publications ==
- Guide to Balanced Diet (1938)
- The Natural Way to Health (1939)
- You Are What You Eat (1940)
- The Lindlahr Vitamin Cook Book (1941)
- Win Health Through Foods (1946)
- 7 Day Reducing Diet (1948)
- 201 Tasty Dishes for Reducers (1948)
- Eat and Reduce! (1948)
- Your Body Energy
- Calorie Countdown (1962)
