= West Lafayette Community School Corporation =

School district in Indiana

Coordinates: 40°26′13.7″N 86°54′19.8″W

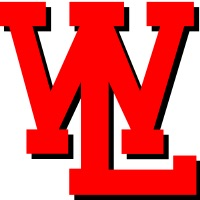

West Lafayette Community School Corporation is a school district located in West Lafayette, Indiana. It has 2,343 students in grades K–12 with a student-teacher ratio of 14 to 1 as of the 2023–2024 school year. According to state test scores, 72% of students are at least proficient in math and 72% in reading.

It covers central portions, but not all of, West Lafayette.

The school district administers the following schools in West Lafayette, Indiana, United States:

- West Lafayette Elementary School (Formerly known as Cumberland Elementary School)
- West Lafayette Intermediate School
- West Lafayette Junior-Senior High School

The superintendent is Shawn Greiner.
