= 87th Scripps National Spelling Bee =

Spelling bee held in the United States in 2014

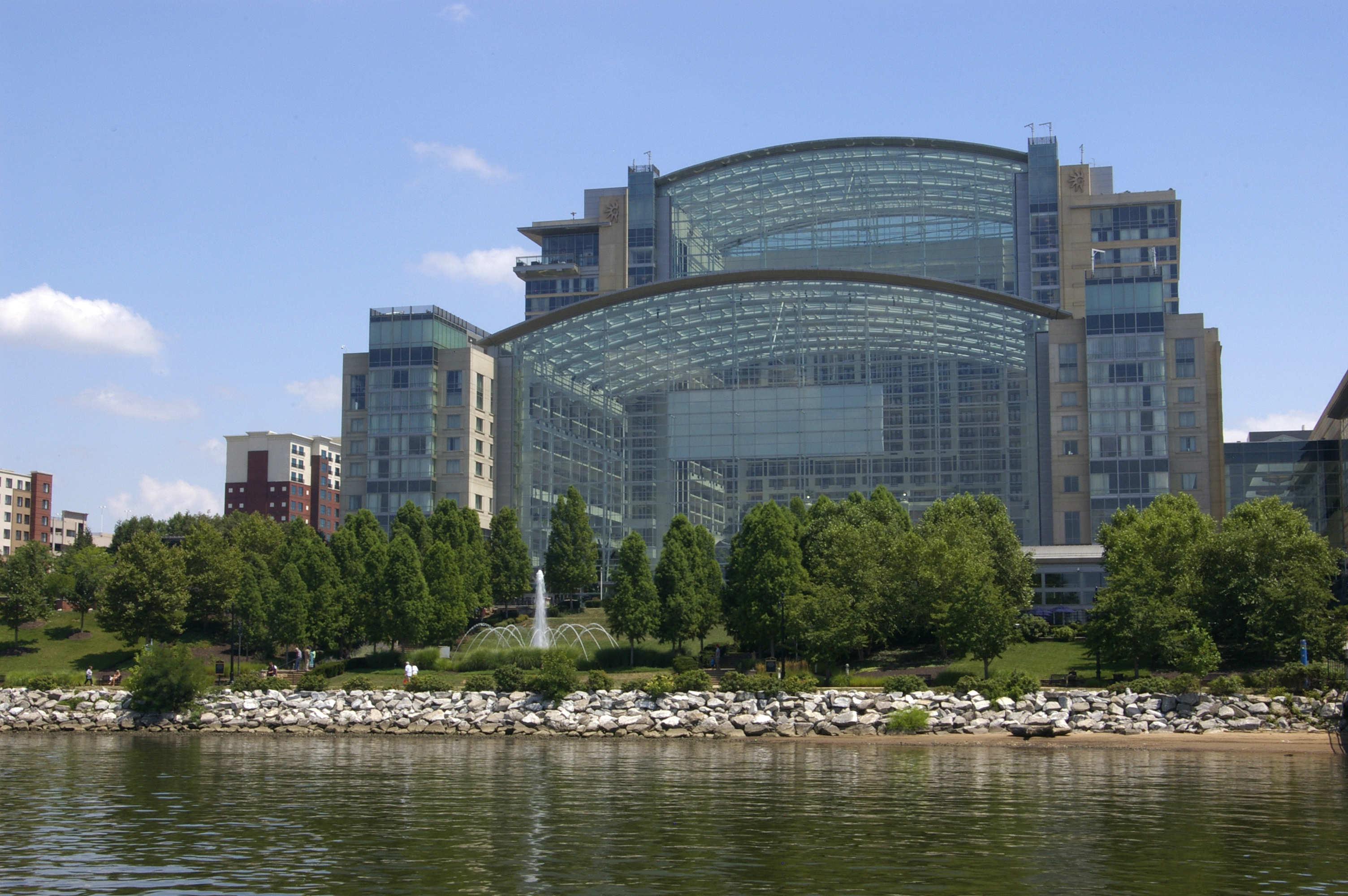
- Date: May 27–29, 2014
- Location: Gaylord National Resort & Convention Center, National Harbor, Maryland
- Winner: Ansun Sujoe; Sriram Hathwar (co-winners) (*13 (Sujoe): 14 (Hathwar); Painted Post, New York (Hathwar) at time of win)
- Sponsor: Texas Christian University (Sujoe); Corning Rotary Club (Hathwar)
- Winning word: feuilleton (Sujoe); stichomythia (Hathwar)
- No. of contestants: 281
- Pronouncer: Jacques Bailly

The 87th Scripps National Spelling Bee was held from May 27 to May 29, 2014, at the Gaylord National in Oxon Hill, Maryland and was broadcast live on ESPN3, ESPN2, and ESPN for the preliminary, semifinal, and final rounds respectively. Ansun Sujoe of Fort Worth, Texas and Sriram Hathwar of Painted Post, New York won the competition, making the 87th Bee the twelfth in the past sixteen competitions to have an Indian-American champion.

== Competition details ==
There were 281 spellers this year, made up of 139 boys and 142 girls. 208 were new national bee contestants. The youngest competitor, at 8 years old, was Hussain A. Godhrawala from South Carolina. The age split was: age 8 (1); age 9 (3); age 10 (7); age 11 (26); age 12 (55); age 13 (98); age 14 (90); age 15 (1). 190 spellers attended public schools, 52 private, 19 parochial, 9 were home schooled, and 9 attended charter schools.

== Finals ==
Both Sujoe and Hathwar spelled their words incorrectly in Round 16 of the championship round. Hathwar misspelled the word corpsbruder, meaning a close comrade. However, Sujoe was unable to take the advantage of the slip-up, misspelling antigropelos, meaning waterproof leggings.

For the rest of the 25-word championship list they spelled every word correctly. In the final round, Hathwar correctly spelled stichomythia and Sujoe correctly spelled feuilleton, exhausting the list of words. As co-champions, Hathwar and Sujoe were the seventh consecutive Indian-Americans to win the competition. It was the first time the competition ended in co-champions in over 50 years, since the 1962 bee.

Hathwar was appearing in the national bee for the fifth time. He had been the youngest participant ever to date when he appeared as a young 8-year-old in the 2008 bee. He was eliminated in the preliminary rounds that year. In 2009 he finished 37th. In 2011 he finished 6th, and he finished third in 2013. His younger brother Jairam was co-winner in 2016.

The top prize was $30,000 this year, which each of the co-winners received due to the tie. Third place was $7,500.

== Word list championship round ==
- chrysochlorous
- rhadamanthine
- tapotement
- quebrada
- charcuterie
- onychoschizia
- détraqué
- holophote
- osteochondrous
- oxygnathous
- ecribellate
- gematria
- taglioni
- Munchausenism
- guillemet
- collyrium
- chartula
- guttatim
- encastage
- tastevin
- exochorion
- dactylion
- hallenkirche
- carcharodont
- logodaedaly
- buñuelo
- pampootie
- hexerei
- vorspiel
- cahier
- kabaragoya
- shibuichi
- brindisi
- kalanchoe
- criollismo
- typothetae
- chalybeate
- aetites
- irbis
- bradypodoid
- bagwyn
- kulturkreis
- croquignole
- eryngo
- semmel
- dépaysé
- ctenoid
- bamboche
- lamentabile
- lotophagi
- abaisse
- nocifensor
- Aeschylean
- Kierkegaardian
- characin
- gemeinschaft
- corpsbruder
- antigropelos
- skandhas
- Hyblaean
- feijoada
- augenphilologie
- sdrucciola
- holluschick
- thymelici
- paixtle
- encaenia
- terreplein
- stichomythia
- feuilleton
