= George Klopfer =

German-born American physician (1940–2019)

Ulrich "George" Klopfer
- Born: August 28, 1940; Dresden, Germany
- Died: September 3, 2019 (aged 79); Illinois, U.S.
- Citizenship: United States (Naturalized Detroit, MI, May 31, 1960)
- Education: University of Michigan; Wayne State University; Chicago College of Osteopathic Medicine
- Occupation: Physician

Ulrich "George" Klopfer (August 28, 1940 – September 3, 2019) was a German-born American osteopathic physician and abortion provider from Indiana and Illinois.

== Early life ==
Klopfer was born on August 28, 1940, in Dresden, Germany. He told documentary filmmaker Mark Archer that he was staying with his aunt in the Dresden suburbs when the allies firebombed the city in 1945. Klopfer would have been four and a half years old at the time. This event, Archer noted, seemed to have been the defining moment of Klopfer's life.

Klopfer was a record-breaking runner on the track team and hoped to represent the United States in the Olympics. Upon graduating in 1959 he planned to become a chemical engineer.

== Naturalization and Education ==
Klopfer was naturalized as a US citizen in Detroit, Michigan, on May 31, 1960. He attended the University of Michigan during the period 1960–1962. He graduated from Wayne State University in 1965 with a degree in organic chemistry. He graduated from the Chicago College of Osteopathic Medicine in 1971. Klopfer became licensed to practice medicine in Illinois, Florida, South Dakota, and Indiana.

== Public attention ==
Klopfer first gained notoriety in November 1978 when the Chicago Sun-Times published its "The Abortion Profiteers" series documenting illegal and otherwise troubling practices among Chicago-area abortion facilities. A nurse reported to an undercover investigator that Ming Kow Hah and Klopfer would race each other to see who could complete the most abortions in a single day. "When Hah is here, Klopfer really zips. Hah marks the patients on his leg, and if Klopfer sees that Hah’s got a leg full, he goes like wildfire to catch up." Another nurse said, "Klopfer would be having a cup of coffee and be on his last sip when he'd jump up and say, 'I'd better get going or Hah will have the whole recovery room full.'"

In August 2016, the Indiana Medical Licensing Board suspended his medical license for failing to exercise reasonable care and violating several documentation requirements.

Upon his death in September 2019, he gained attention when the sheriff's office of Will County, Illinois, said that authorities had found 2,246 preserved fetal remains at his home. An additional 165 remains were found in the trunk of a car in October, totaling 2,411 fetal remains.
