= Chicago College of Osteopathic Medicine =

Medical school of Midwestern University

- Former names: American College of Osteopathic Medicine and Surgery
- Motto: "Proud Past, Strong Future"
- Type: Private medical school
- Established: 1900; 126 years ago
- Parent institution: Midwestern University
- President: Joshua C. Baker
- Dean: Thomas A. Boyle
- Location: Downers Grove, Illinois, United States; 41.8274°N 87.9993°W
- Campus: Suburban: Downers Grove, 140 acres (56.7 ha)
- Colors: White and Blue
- Website: www.midwestern.edu/osteopathic

The Chicago College of Osteopathic Medicine (CCOM) is the medical school of Midwestern University in Downers Grove, Illinois, United States. CCOM grants the Doctor of Osteopathic Medicine (D.O.) academic degree and is accredited by the American Osteopathic Association's Commission on Osteopathic College Accreditation (COCA).

Founded in 1900 as the American College of Osteopathic Medicine and Surgery, Midwestern University is the fourth-oldest medical school currently active in the state of Illinois. In 1995, it opened an additional campus in Glendale, Arizona, the Arizona College of Osteopathic Medicine, becoming the second medical school to teach students in the state. Since its founding in 1900, the Chicago College of Osteopathic Medicine has graduated more than 6,000 alumni and accounts for nearly 13 percent of all practicing osteopathic physicians and surgeons in the United States.

Midwestern University trains students to work as part of an inter-disciplinary team and provide integrated, patient-centered care alongside other healthcare practitioners. It also confers degrees in Doctor of Dental Medicine, Doctor of Optometry, Doctor of Pharmacy, Doctor of Physical Therapy, Occupational Therapy, Doctor of Psychology, Physician Assistant, and several other master's degree programs.

Midwestern University operates several clinics in Glendale, Arizona, and in Downers Grove, Illinois. The Midwestern University Multi-Specialty Clinic consists of a five-story, 193,000 square foot building, which opened in 2012 at a cost of $112 million. The clinic includes a dental institute, a family practice clinic, speech & language institute, and an optometry clinic.

The Downers Grove campus, located on a 156-acre (63.1 ha) site in Downers Grove, is home to over 1,000 students at any time.

== History ==
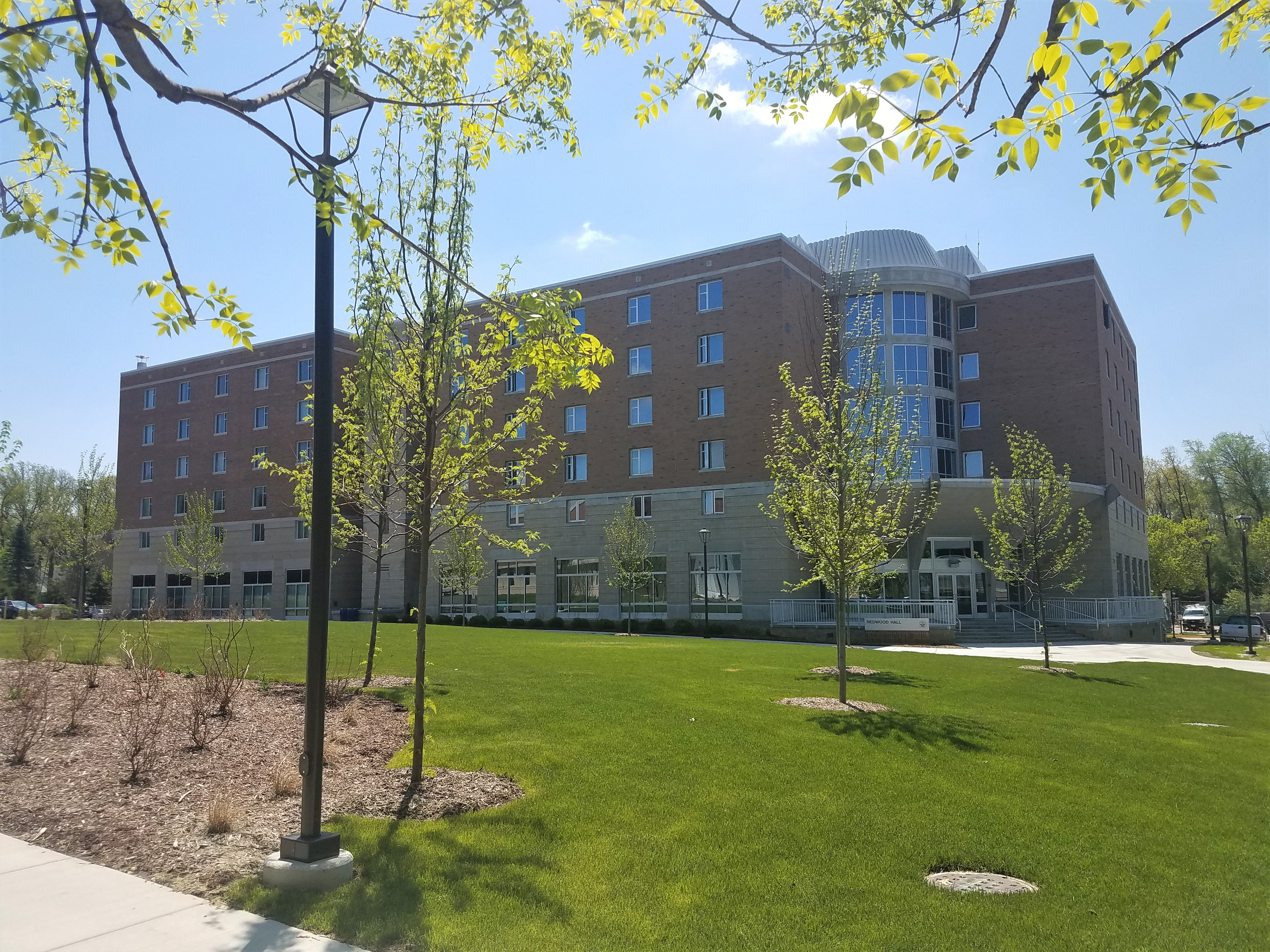
Redwood Hall is a student housing building with an auditorium and chapel.

CCOM was founded in 1900 as the American College of Osteopathic Medicine and Surgery by J. Martin Littlejohn, Ph.D., D.O., M.D. (1865–1947). The school was incorporated as a non-profit in Chicago, Illinois, to train physicians. It was the fourth osteopathic medical school to open in the United States.

The Downers Grove, Illinois, Campus was purchased in 1986, and the Chicago College of Osteopathic Medicine (CCOM) moved from its prior home in Hyde Park, Illinois, to this western suburb. Following the relocation of the college, the board of trustees voted to begin the development of new academic programs within the health sciences. The Chicago College of Pharmacy (CCP) began in 1991, the College of Health Sciences (CHS) began in 1992, the College of Dental Medicine - Illinois (CDMI) in 2009, and the Optometry Program in 2014. In 1993, the board of trustees unanimously approved a single, educational mission for the institution, and Midwestern University emerged. In Spring 2013, the university opened the MWU Medical Campus.

The Downers Grove campus is located on a 105-acre (42.5 ha) site in Downers Grove, Illinois, a suburban area 25 miles west of downtown Chicago. It contains an abundance of green space, wooded areas, and a nature trail, in addition to classrooms, laboratories, a library, an auditorium building, and recreational facilities. The Science Hall is a 239,000 square foot building which consists of classrooms, more than 100 offices, and 25 laboratories. The Science Hall opened in 2011, and includes a gross anatomy lab, research labs and a clinical simulation lab.

== Campus ==
The Downers Grove Campus consists of 20 buildings located on 105 acres, which includes academic classrooms, laboratories, a library and auditorium building, science building, student commons, recreation center, and student housing. Redwood Hall is a six-story building that includes student housing, and auditorium and chapel.

== Academics ==
MWU-CCOM Affiliated Hospitals
	Location
John H. Stroger Jr. Hospital of Cook County	Chicago
Advocate Good Samaritan Hospital	Downers Grove
Advocate Christ Medical Center	Oak Lawn
Advocate Lutheran General Hospital	Park Ridge
Swedish Covenant Hospital	Chicago
Riverside Medical Center	Kankakee
Advocate Sherman Hospital	Elgin
Franciscan Health	Olympia Fields
Advocate Illinois Masonic Medical Center	Chicago

The university is accredited by the Higher Learning Commission. The medical school is also accredited by the American Osteopathic Association's Commission on Osteopathic College Accreditation.

Midwestern University also offers a continuity of medical education from the first year of medical school to the final year of postgraduate training. Midwestern University is affiliated with the Osteopathic Postdoctoral Training Institution (OPTI). Residency programs cover several medical specialties. Programs follow the guidelines of and receive accreditation from the Bureau of Osteopathic Education of the American Osteopathic Association.

== Notable alumni ==
- Clinton E. Adams, former medical school dean at Western University of Health Sciences, and current president of Rocky Vista University.
- Douglas J. Robb, retired United States Air Force lieutenant general
- Victor Lindlahr, American radio presenter and health food writer
- Richard Scheuring, NASA flight surgeon at the Lyndon B. Johnson Space Center
- Sheil Shukla, Author of Plant-Based India
- James N. Weinstein, chief executive officer and President of the Dartmouth-Hitchcock Health System
- Emily Temple-Wood, recipient of the 2016 Wikipedian of the Year award.

== See also ==
- Arizona College of Osteopathic Medicine, a branch campus of Midwestern University, located in Glendale, Arizona.
- List of medical schools in the United States
