= 81st Scripps National Spelling Bee =

2008 spelling competition

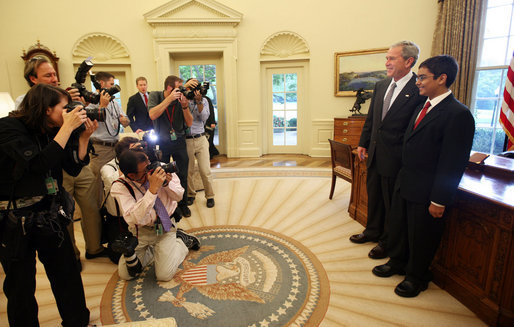
- George W. Bush with the 2008 Champion Sameer Mishra in the Oval Office, August 13, 2008.
- Date: May 2008
- Location: Grand Hyatt Washington, Washington, D.C.
- Winner: Sameer Mishra (13 at time of win)
- Sponsor: Journal & Courier
- Sponsor location: Lafayette, Indiana
- Winning word: guerdon
- No. of contestants: 288
- Pronouncer: Jacques Bailly

The 81st Scripps National Spelling Bee finals took place on May 30, 2008.

== Competition ==
Two hundred eighty-eight champion spellers competed in the 2008 Scripps National Spelling Bee in Washington, D.C., a new record. Most of the spellers were from the United States, with a small showing from other locations such as Ghana, Jamaica, New Zealand, and South Korea. Twenty-two were Canadian. Wikipedian Emily Temple-Wood was one of the competitors. Sriram Hathwar, who would be a co-winner of the 2014 bee six years later, set a new record as the youngest ever participant to date, only a month past his 8th birthday.

== Champion ==
The winner was Sameer Mishra, a 13-year-old eighth grader at West Lafayette Junior-Senior High School, in Indiana. He was sponsored by his hometown newspaper, the Journal & Courier. His winning word was guerdon. He won $35,000 in cash and more than $5,000 in prizes.

In rounds 3 through 15, Mishra spelled "demitasse," "quadrat," "diener," "hyssop," "macédoine," "basenji," "numnah," "chorion," "nacarat," "sinicize," "hyphaeresis," "taleggio" and "esclandre" correctly, in that order. Sidharth Chand, 13, finished in second place, misspelling "prosopopoeia" as "prosopopoea." Third place went to 13-year-old Tia Thomas, misspelling "opificer" as "epificer."

In a comical moment during the spelling bee, he mistook the word "numnah" for "numb nut."

Mishra incorrectly spelled "sudation" in Round 2 as "sudatian." However, because a speller's combined score from Rounds 1 and 2 determined whether they advance in the competition, a speller could incorrectly spell a word in Round 2 without being eliminated.

== TV coverage ==
As with previous years, coverage was divided amongst American Broadcasting Company properties, the quarterfinals were broadcast on ESPN360, the semifinals were aired on ESPN, and the finals were broadcast by ABC. Unlike other ESPN-produced telecasts for ABC, ESPN branding was not used, even though the telecasts adopted the newer-styled ESPN graphics package.

== Word list championship round ==
- guerdon
- prosopopoeia
- esclandre
- introuvable
- taleggio
- Kulturkampf
- hyphaeresis
- opificer
- aptyalism
- sinicize
- oxylophytic
- tamale
- posaune
- ecrase
- nacarat
- shtetl
- rhyton
- Huapango
- parfleche
- lemel
- bogatyr
- ziarat
- martellato
- chorion
- fumagillin
- satyagraha
- escabeche
- Nietzschean
- ranunculaceous
- boulangère
- ommateal

== See also ==
- List of Scripps National Spelling Bee champions
