= West Lafayette Junior-Senior High School =

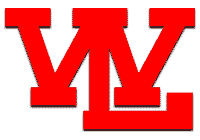

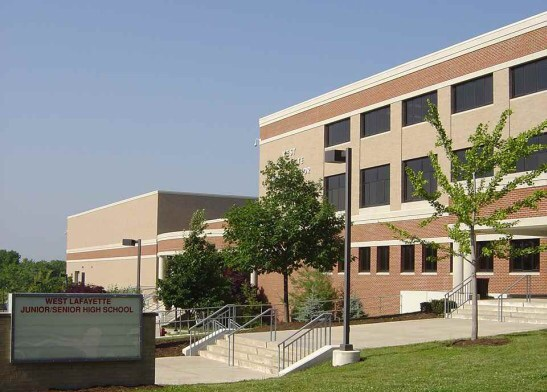
- West Lafayette Junior-Senior High School in 2008

Location
- 1105 North Grant Street; West Lafayette, Tippecanoe County, Indiana 47906; United States; 40°26′10″N 86°54′43″W

Information
- Type: Public high school
- Established: 1939
- School district: West Lafayette Community School Corporation
- Principal: Chad Rodgers
- Teaching staff: 78.50 (FTE)
- Grades: 7–12
- Enrollment: 1,110 (2023-2024)
- Student to teacher ratio: 14.14
- Colors: Scarlet and gray
- Athletics conference: Hoosier Athletic Conference
- Team name: Red Devils
- Rivals: Jefferson High School, Harrison High School, and Central Catholic High School
- Website: School website

West Lafayette Junior-Senior High School (also informally known as West Side High School or simply West Side) is the only high school within the West Lafayette city limits, and is administered by the West Lafayette Community School Corporation.

The school district which this school belongs to covers central portions of West Lafayette municipality.

West Lafayette Junior-Senior High School was constructed in 1939 of cream brick and glass at a cost of $225,000, and was remodeled in the late 1990s. It underwent major renovations and additions beginning in the late 2010s, including a new library and aquatic center. The school is located near Purdue University, and the children of many Purdue faculty and staff attend West Lafayette Junior-Senior High School. In 2012, the school was ranked as the 2nd and 4th best public high school in Indiana by U.S. News & World Report and Newsweek, respectively. As of 2021, the high school was ranked in U.S. News & World Report as 2nd in Indiana and 239th nationwide.

Students at West Lafayette Junior-Senior High School exhibit strong performance in academics, demonstrating an average of 63% for mathematic proficiency and 73% on average for reading proficiency as of 2021.

== Athletics ==
The school offers athletic programs including football, baseball, basketball, cheerleading, cross country, soccer, wrestling, golf, track and field, swimming, tennis and volleyball. The teams play under the nickname of the Red Devils and belong to the Hoosier Athletic Conference. The Red Devils have won 7 state championships.

IHSAA State Championships
Sport	Year(s)
Girls Basketball (1)	1998
Boys Cross Country (2)	1964, 2014
Football (3)	1993, 2009, 2018
Girls Soccer (1)	2013

== Notable alumni ==
- Sonia Y. Angell (Class of 1983), public health leader
- Moungi Bawendi (Class of 1978), winner of the 2023 Nobel Prize in Chemistry and professor at MIT
- Katie Bouman (Class of 2007), imaging scientist
- Greg Christopher (Class of 1984), athletic director
- Neil Eggleston (Class of 1971), White House Counsel
- Paul Eremenko (Class of 1997), innovator and technology executive
- Bob Friend (Class of 1949), pitcher for the Pittsburgh Pirates
- Gen Fukunaga (Class of 1979), founder of Funimation Entertainment
- George Karlaftis (Class of 2019), NFL football player
- Tom Kelly (Class of 1967), songwriter
- Joseph Lee (Class of 2006), actor
- Philip Low (Class of 1965), chemist
- Jay McDowell (Class of 1987), bassist for country music band BR549
- Gavin Mikhail (Class of 1991), singer-songwriter
- Sameer Mishra (Class of 2012), won the 81st Scripps National Spelling Bee
- Tom Moore (Class of 1961), director
- Toby Moskowitz (Class of 1989), financial economist
- Chike Okeafor (Class of 1994), NFL football player
- Eric Rodwell (Class of 1974), professional bridge player
- Brian M. Rosenthal (Class of 2007), investigative reporter
- Carolyn Wood Sherif (Class of 1940), social psychologist
- Janet Tobias (Class of 1976), television producer
- Randy Truitt (Class of 1986), member of the Indiana House of Representatives
- Dan Wodicka (Class of 2010), winner of the 2009 Mr. Football Award (Indiana) and Johns Hopkins Blue Jays Football head coach

== See also ==
- List of high schools in Indiana
