= Journal & Courier =

Daily newspaper in Lafayette, Indiana, U.S.

- Type: Daily newspaper
- Format: Berliner
- Owner: USA Today Co.
- Founder: Henry W. Marshall
- Publisher: Karen Ferguson
- Editor: Deanna Watson
- Founded: 1920; 106 years ago
- Headquarters: 823 Park East Blvd. Lafayette, IN 47905; United States
- Website: jconline.com

The Lafayette Journal & Courier is a daily newspaper owned by USA Today Co., serving Lafayette, Indiana, and the surrounding communities. It was established in 1920 through the merger of two local papers, the Journal and Free Press (established in 1829 under the name John B. Semans' Free Press) and the Courier (established in 1845).

In 2016, the newspaper moved from its long-time downtown headquarters to a new building on Lafayette's east side, closer to its press and production facility.

== Format ==
With its change of format on July 31, 2006, the Journal & Courier became the first daily newspaper in North America to use the Berliner layout.

== Circulation ==
As of September 2010, average daily circulation is 27,837. Sunday circulation is 39,343.

The Journal & Courier is one of 35 Gannett newspapers that contain a seven-day edition of USA Today.

In March 2024, the newspaper announced it will switch from carrier to postal delivery.

== Trivia ==
- In 2008, the Journal & Courier sponsored Sameer Mishra, the winner of the 81st Scripps National Spelling Bee.
