= 35th Scripps National Spelling Bee =

Spelling bee held in the United States in 1962

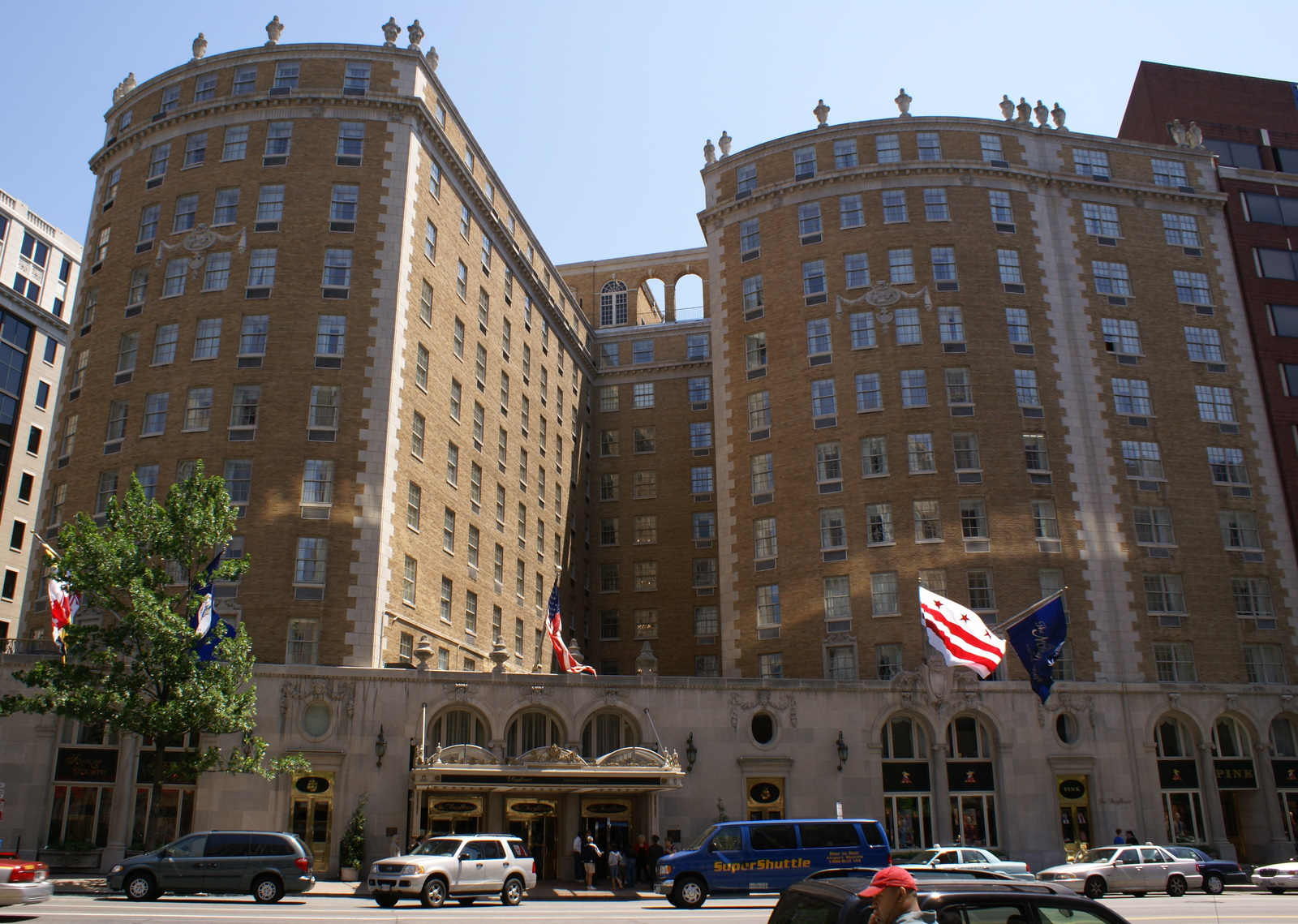
- The Mayflower Hotel, site of the 35th National Spelling Bee
- Date: June 6–7, 1962
- Location: The Mayflower Hotel in Washington, D.C.
- Winner: Nettie Crawford / Mike Day (tie) (13 / 14 at time of win)
- Sponsor: El Paso Herald-Post / St. Louis Globe-Democrat
- Sponsor location: El Paso, Texas / St. Louis, Missouri
- Winning word: esquamulose (both missed final word)
- No. of contestants: 70
- Pronouncer: Richard R. Baker

The 35th Scripps National Spelling Bee was held in Washington, District of Columbia on June 6–7, 1962, sponsored by the E.W. Scripps Company.

Nettie Crawford (age 13) of Roswell, New Mexico and Mike Day (age 14) of Hardin, Illinois were announced as co-champions (the third tie in the bee's history) after both misspelled esquamulose, following an hour of head-to-head competition as the final contestants. The next tie-ending did not occur for over 50 years, in the 2014 bee. Third place was captured by Barbara Brugnaux, 14, of Ohio, who was eliminated in the 15th round after misspelling xylophagous.

There were 70 contestants this year, 48 girls and 21 boys. 718 words were used.
