= Arizona College of Osteopathic Medicine =

Osteopathic medical school in Glendale, Arizona

Arizona College of Osteopathic Medicine (AZCOM)
- Former names: American College of Osteopathic Medicine and Surgery
- Type: Private non-profit
- Established: 1995
- Parent institution: Midwestern University
- Dean: Lori Kemper, D.O.
- Location: Glendale, Arizona, U.S. 33.66404°N 112.18353°W
- Campus: Suburban: Glendale, 140 acres (56.7 ha)
- Colors: blue and white
- Website: Official website

Arizona College of Osteopathic Medicine (AZCOM) is a school of osteopathic medicine in Glendale, Arizona, part of Midwestern University. It grants the Doctor of Osteopathic Medicine (D.O.) degree.

AZCOM was established in 1995 when the Board of Trustees approved the purchase of land and the building of a new campus. Today, the Glendale Campus is on 135 acres and includes academic buildings, laboratory facilities, student housing, and an on-campus osteopathic clinic. The first class of osteopathic medical students began classes on September 30, 1996, and graduated on June 4, 2000. AZCOM received accreditation by the American Osteopathic Association's Commission on Osteopathic College Accreditation following this.

AZCOM has developed partnerships with more than 2,000 physicians at major metropolitan health centers and specialized private practices throughout the State of Arizona and U.S to provide clinical rotations for students during their third and fourth years. AZCOM has established new postdoctoral programs in primary care disciplines through its Arizona Graduate Medical Education Consortium. Internship and residency programs are offered at several hospitals throughout Arizona.

AZCOM has graduated twenty-one classes of osteopathic physicians, increasing the number of primary care providers in Arizona and strengthening one of the state's primary economic clusters in the Arizona Strategic Plan for Economic Development.

The Arizona campus, located on a 156-acre (63.1 ha) site in Glendale, is home to over 1,000 students at any time.

== History ==
AZCOM was established in 1995 when the Board of Trustees approved the purchase of land and the building of a new campus. The school was initially named the "American College of Osteopathic Medicine and Surgery."

The school was incorporated as a non-profit based out of Chicago, the location of its parent university, Midwestern University. AZCOM was the seventeenth osteopathic medical school to open in the United States. The first class of osteopathic medical students began classes on September 30, 1996. Upon graduating the first class of physicians on June 4, 2000, AZCOM received full accreditation by the American Osteopathic Association's Commission on Osteopathic College Accreditation.

== Campus ==
The campus for AZCOM is located in Glendale, Arizona. It is located on a 156-acre (63.1 ha) site in Glendale, is home to over 1,000 students at any time. The campus includes academic buildings, laboratory facilities, student housing, and an on-campus osteopathic clinic.

== Academics ==
AZCOM awards a four-year Doctor of Osteopathic Medicine degree. It is one of the colleges of the Chicago-based Midwestern University.

AZCOM has established new postdoctoral programs in primary care disciplines through its Arizona Graduate Medical Education Consortium. Internship and residency programs are offered at several hospitals throughout Arizona.

== See also ==
- List of medical schools in the United States
