= Henry Lindlahr =

19th-century naturopath

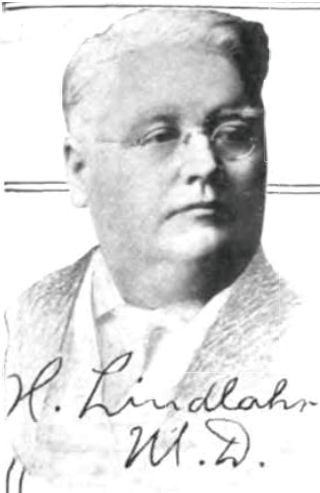
- Born: March 1, 1862; Cologne
- Died: March 26, 1924 (aged 62); Chicago
- Occupation: physician

Henry Lindlahr (March 1, 1862 – March 26, 1924) was the author of one of the cornerstone texts of American naturopathic medicine, Nature Cure, which includes topics about disease suppression versus elimination, hydrotherapy, and the importance of fresh air and sun bathing.

== Career ==
Lindlahr was born March 1, 1862, in Cologne, Kingdom of Prussia. He devoted himself to healing after being helped by Father Sebastian Kneipp (1821–1897), in Europe. Lindlahr was also influenced by the ideas of Bernarr Macfadden. He graduated from the National Medical University in Illinois, US. In 1902, he opened his practice in Chicago. In 1914, he founded the Lindlahr Sanitarium, in Elmhurst, Illinois.

Lindlahr and his institute were criticized by medical health experts for peddling quackery. For example, Lindlahr was an advocate of "Iridiagnosis", a method alleged to diagnosis any disease by examining the eye alone. He also claimed that vaccination was worthless against smallpox and was the cause of cancer, tuberculosis and insanity.

Physician Morris Fishbein noted that "the methods of diagnosis used in the Lindlahr institution were preposterous, the methods of treatment varied and ridiculous." These included dubious treatments such as chiropractic, homeopathy, osteopathy and "strange" diets. He died in Chicago on March 26, 1924.

== Publications ==
- Nature Cure; Philosophy and Practice Based on the Unity of Disease and Cure. Nature Cure Publishing. 1913. ISBN 9781150083747. reprint General Books LLC, 2009, ISBN 978-1-150-08374-7
- The Lindlahr Vegetarian Cook Book and ABC of Natural Dietetics (also published as: Nature Cure Cook Book and ABC of Natural Dietetics). Nature Cure Pub. Co. 1918. ISBN 9780766186606.; reprint Kessinger Publishing, 2004, ISBN 978-0-7661-8660-6 also published as: Nature Cure Cook Book and ABC of Natural Dietetics
- Philosophy of Natural Therapeutics. The Lindlahr Publishing Co. 1918. ISBN 9780766183834. Reprint Kessinger Publishing, 2004, ISBN 978-0-7661-8383-4
- Practice of Natural Therapeutics. The Lindlahr Pub. Co. 1919. "henry lindlahr."
- Iridiagnosis and Other Diagnostic Methods. The Lindlahr Pub. Co. 1919. "henry lindlahr." reprint Kessinger Publishing, 2004, ISBN 978-0-7661-8730-6
