= Riverside Medical Center =

- Riverside Healthcare

Geography
- Location: Kankakee, Illinois, United States
- Coordinates: 41°7′29.2″N 87°52′53.3″W

Organization
- Type: Teaching, Community
- Affiliated university: Chicago College of Osteopathic Medicine

Services
- Emergency department: Level II trauma center
- Beds: 300

History
- Founded: 1964

Links
- Website: www.riversidehealthcare.org/location/riverside-medical-center
- Lists: Hospitals in Illinois

Riverside Medical Center is a 300-bed teaching hospital located in Kankakee, Illinois. The hospital operates a Level II Trauma Center and a primary stroke center. The hospital provides inpatient acute care and outpatient services. Founded in 1964, the hospital is a part of Riverside Healthcare.

The hospital operates a number of residency training and fellowship programs for newly graduated physicians. The residencies train physicians specializing in psychiatry and internal medicine, and the fellowships train physicians specializing in cardiology, interventional cardiology and gastroenterology.

On March 19, 2020, the first case of COVID-19 infection in Kankakee was reported at Riverside Medical Center. The following month, the hospital began onsite testing for COVID-19 infection.
