= Emily Temple-Wood =

American Wikipedia editor and physician (born 1994)

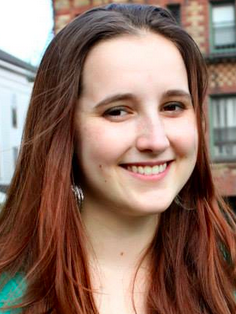
- Temple-Wood in 2015
- Born: May 24, 1994 (age 32); Chicago, Illinois, U.S.
- Other name: Keilana
- Education: Loyola University Chicago (BS); Midwestern University (DO)
- Occupations: Physician; Wikipedian
- Known for: Creating Wikipedia articles about women scientists
- Awards: Wikipedian of the Year (2016)
- Temple-Wood's voice Recorded August 2017

Emily Temple-Wood (born May 24, 1994) is an American physician and Wikipedia editor, who goes by pseudonym Keilana on the site. She is known for her efforts to counter the effects and causes of gender bias on Wikipedia, particularly through the creation of articles about women in science. She was declared a joint recipient of the 2016 Wikipedian of the Year award by Jimmy Wales at Wikimania. Temple-Wood graduated from Loyola University Chicago and Midwestern University. She practices medicine in Minnesota.

== Early life and education ==
Temple-Wood attended Avery Coonley School in Downers Grove, Illinois. A 2017 Wired article described her as "the type of middle schooler who refused to stand for the Pledge of Allegiance, because she thought the idea of making children swear a loyalty oath was bizarre." She won the 2008 DuPage County Spelling Bee. This victory led to her participating in the Scripps National Spelling Bee the same year, where she lasted until the quarterfinals and finished in 46th place. Following the competition, in June 2008 she was honored by the then-lieutenant governor of Illinois, Pat Quinn, along with the other regional spelling bee champions. She went on to attend Downers Grove North High School, where she was a member of the speech team. This team won four medals, one of which was for first place, at the 2011 Illinois High School Association state meet in Peoria. As a senior, she was named to the "top two percent" in 2012.

In May 2016, she graduated from Loyola University Chicago with degrees in molecular biology and Arabic and Islamic studies. She began medical school at Chicago's Midwestern University in the fall of 2016. Since 2020, she is a medical school graduate and was a practicing physician in Chicago. She later became a practicing physician in Montevideo, Minnesota.

== Work on Wikipedia ==
Video of Temple-Wood expressing why she thinks more women should edit, and be represented on, Wikipedia

Temple-Wood received national press coverage for creating Wikipedia articles about women scientists, as well as her activism to increase their representation on Wikipedia. She made her first edit to Wikipedia in 2005, at the age of 10. She first started contributing to the site when she was 12, and it was when she was 12 that she was first harassed online as a result of her Wikipedia contributions. She began her efforts in regards to women scientists when she was in middle school. In 2007, she became an administrator on Wikipedia and served on the Arbitration Committee from 2016 to 2017. She co-founded Wikipedia's WikiProject Women Scientists in 2012; since then, she has written hundreds of Wikipedia pages about female scientists. Editing under the username "Keilana", she began creating such articles when she noticed that few women who were members of the Royal Society had Wikipedia articles. She told the Wikimedia Foundation that when she first noticed this, she "got pissed and wrote an article that night. I literally sat in the hallway in the dorm until 2 a.m. writing [my] first women in science article." The article she is the most proud of is that on Rosalyn Scott, the first African-American woman to become a thoracic surgeon.

Interview with Temple-Wood in 2013 by Wikimedia Deutschland

Temple-Wood has also organized edit-a-thons at museums and libraries with the aim of increasing the representation of women scientists on Wikipedia. In October 2015, she told The Atlantic that she had identified 4,400 women scientists who did not have Wikipedia articles written about them even though each of them was notable enough to be covered by one. In March 2016, she gained international media attention because of her approach to the online sexual harassment she had received: for every such email she received, she plans to create a Wikipedia article about a woman scientist. That month, she told BuzzFeed News that with respect to her doing this, "My motivation is to channel the frustration I feel from being harassed into something productive." In May 2016, she told The Fader: "As a Wikipedian, my natural response to seeing a gap in coverage is to start a project, so that's what I did with the Women Scientists project. The narrative of history has been dominated by men, and making sure that women's biographies are included in Wikipedia can be our way of writing women back into that narrative."

Her work led to her being named as joint Wikipedian of the Year in 2016, along with Rosie Stephenson-Goodknight.

== Positions ==
Temple-Wood is a member of the board of directors of Wikimedia DC, the District of Columbia-area chapter of the Wikimedia movement. She is also a board member of the Wiki Project Med Foundation, and has served as Wikipedian in Residence at the National Institute for Occupational Safety and Health.

== The Keilana effect ==
Inflection point in women scientists articles' quality, together with Temple-Wood's impulsed community efforts

The paper "Interpolating Quality Dynamics in Wikipedia and Demonstrating the Keilana Effect", about a phenomenon named after Temple-Wood's work, was presented by Aaron Halfaker at OpenSym '17, the International Symposium on Open Collaboration. This study finds an inflection point in term of articles' quality for women scientists around late 2012, when Temple-Wood impulsed a community effort on that matter.

== Personal life ==
Temple-Wood self-describes herself as queer. In October 2020, on National Coming Out Day, she wrote on Twitter that she was "proud to be a queer physician." She is married and lives with her husband and two cats.

== Works ==
- Temple-Wood, Emily (2017). "Rewriting the History of Women in Science". Scientific American. 317 (3): 70–71. doi:10.1038/scientificamerican0917-70. PMID 28813402.
- "Wikipedia and the New Web". Facebook Nation. Springer New York. October 1, 2014. pp. 189–199. ISBN 978-1-4939-1739-6.
- Temple-Wood, Emily; Silva, Diane. Exploring the Role of Raw in the Embryonic Nervous System. 56th Annual Drosophila Research Conference. Genetics Society of America. "March 4–8, 2015"
- Temple-Wood, Emily (April 12, 2016). "It's Time These Ancient Women Scientists Get Their Due". Nautilus. Reprinted in The Best American Science and Nature Writing 2017. Jahren, Hope, editor. Boston. ISBN 9781328715517. OCLC 1004672002.
- Silva, Diane; Olsen, Kenneth W.; Bednarz, Magdalena N.; Droste, Andrew; Lenkeit, Christopher P.; Chaharbakhshi, Edwin; Temple-Wood, Emily R.; Jemc, Jennifer C.; Singh, Shree Ram (November 29, 2016). "Regulation of Gonad Morphogenesis in Drosophila melanogaster by BTB Family Transcription Factors". PLOS ONE. 11 (11) e0167283. Bibcode:2016PLoSO..1167283S. doi:10.1371/journal.pone.0167283. PMC 5127561. PMID 27898696.
- Labchuk, Andrii; Temple-Wood, Emily; Sherlock, Daniel; Russell, James; Krive, Marianna (January 2023). "A Case of Tachycardia-Induced Cardiomyopathy During Pregnancy: Clinical Presentation and Management". Cureus. 15 (1) e33229. doi:10.7759/cureus.33229. ISSN 2168-8184. PMC 9889206. PMID 36733546.
- Rauf, Anis Abdul; Topf, Joel M.; Temple-Wood, Emily (2021). "Abdominal Compartment Syndrome". Handbook of Critical Care Nephrology. Lippincott Williams & Wilkins. ISBN 978-1-9751-4409-8.

== See also ==
- List of Loyola University Chicago people
- List of Wikipedia people
