= Philip Low (chemist) =

American chemist (1947–2026)

Philip Stewart Low
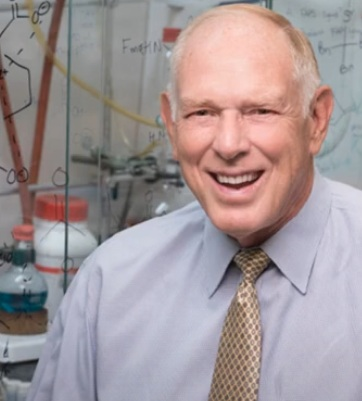
- Born: August 8, 1947; Ames, Iowa, U.S.
- Died: March 4, 2026 (aged 78); West Lafayette, Indiana, U.S.
- Education: Ph.D., University of California, San Diego (1975); B.S., Brigham Young University (1971)
- Father: Philip F. Low
- Awards: George & Christine Sosnovsky Award For Cancer Research (American Chemical Society)
- Scientific career
- Fields: Biopharmacology
- Thesis: Molecular mechanisms of enzyme adaptation to temperature and pressure (1975)
- Website: www.chem.purdue.edu/people/profile/plow

Philip Stewart Low (August 8, 1947 – March 4, 2026) was an American scientist and the Ralph C. Corley Distinguished Professor of Chemistry at Purdue University. He was a prolific researcher whose work supported numerous drug discoveries and he was credited as one of the developers of Pluvicto. Low cofounded the biotechnology company Endocyte, which was later acquired by Novartis, as well as the biopharmaceutical company Novosteo, which was later purchased by Cortexyme.

Low was a recipient of the American Chemical Society's George & Christine Sosnovsky Award for Cancer Research. He was the son of agronomist Philip F. Low.

== Early life and education ==
Low was born in Ames, Iowa, on August 8, 1947. His father, Philip F. Low, was a pioneering argonomist noted as one of the first American scientists invited to lecture in the People's Republic of China (PRC) following the establishment of diplomatic relations between the United States and the PRC. Born in Carmangay, Alberta, Canada, he relocated to Utah with his family while in high school and later attended Brigham Young University. The elder Low was granted U.S. citizenship in 1940 and served as a meteorologist in the U.S. Army Air Corps during World War II. He went on to earn a doctorate in chemistry from Iowa State University before beginning a long academic career at Purdue University.

Low attended West Lafayette Junior-Senior High School in West Lafayette, Indiana. According to Low, he struggled in his high school science courses but—encouraged by his father—went on to study chemistry at Brigham Young University on a basketball scholarship, where he earned a Bachelor of Science degree. He was a Mormon missionary to West Germany and in 1975 he completed a Ph.D. at the University of California, San Diego.

== Career ==
In 1976, Low joined the faculty of Purdue University where his father was, at the time, also teaching. He has remained at Purdue since then and, as of 2025, was the Ralph C. Corley Distinguished Professor of Chemistry.

Low's scientific work has resulted in numerous drug discoveries, he is the author or coauthor of more than 350 scholarly articles, and he has been listed on more than 600 patents. In 2014, Purdue University constructed the Drug Discovery Building on its West Lafayette, Indiana campus in part to accommodate Low's expansive research. Low, along with Timothy Ratliff and Tom Gardner, is credited with the development of the prostate cancer drug Pluvicto, which was granted breakthrough status by the Food and Drug Administration in 2021.

In the late 1990s, Low cofounded, with Christopher Leamon, biotechnology company Endocyte where he served as chief science officer. The company was purchased by Novartis in 2018 in a $2.1 billion sale. He later founded Novosteo, a clinical-stage biopharmaceutical company, which was acquired by Cortexyme in 2022.

In 2015, Low received the American Chemical Society's George & Christine Sosnovsky Award For Cancer Research, and the American Association for Cancer Research's Award for Outstanding Achievement in Chemistry in Cancer Research. He was an elected fellow of the National Academy of Inventors.

== Personal life and death ==
Low was married with five children and 19 grandchildren.

He was a member of the Church of Jesus Christ of Latter Day Saints. Low said that "science supports and, in fact, confirms" his belief in Mormonism.

Low died at his home on March 4, 2026, at the age of 78.

== See also ==
- David E. Nichols
