= Vincent A. Mahler =

Vincent A. Mahler is a professor of Political Science at Loyola University Chicago, where he serves as the Undergraduate Program Director.

== Academic history ==
Mahler received his B.A. and M.A. from Loyola University Chicago and his PhD from Columbia University. He lives in Park Ridge, Illinois.

== Research history ==
Mahler's teaching and research interests include comparative social policy, Western European politics, and quantitative methods. His work has been cited by popular media and published in several academic journals.

Mahler has twice been a guest academic at the Luxembourg Income Study, and wrote a book about his research titled Dependency Approaches to International Political Economy.
