= Sheil Shukla =

American author

- Education: DO, Chicago College of Osteopathic Medicine
- Occupations: Internal medicine specialist and author
- Writing career
- Genre: plant-based nutrition
- Notable work: Plant-Based India
- Website: sheilshukla.com

Sheil Shukla is an American board-certified internal medicine specialist. He is also a recipe developer, food photographer, and cookbook author, who explores the use of plant-based nutrition as preventative clinical medicine. His first cookbook, Plant-Based India, was nominated for the 2023 James Beard Foundation Award.

== Early life and education ==
Shukla was born "just outside of Milwaukee, Wisconsin," to parents who had immigrated from Gujarat, India in the 1970s. He graduated from Brookfield Academy in 2011.

He grew up eating Gujatarti vegetarian dishes, and during college (where he studied molecular biology and the fine arts), he taught himself to cook, drawing upon dishes from his childhood. He also became interested in nutrition, and after becoming vegan in 2015, he eventually "embraced plant based nutrition beyond veganism." He started an Instagram account and blog called "plantbasedartist," and became a recipe developer and food photographer. Shukla received his Doctor of Osteopathic Medicine from the Chicago College of Osteopathic Medicine in 2019. He also earned a certificate in plant-based nutrition from Cornell University (online).

== Career ==
Shukla is currently an internal medicine specialist with Northwestern University's Northwestern Memorial Hospital. The New York Times listed his first cookbook, Plant-Based India (2022), as one of the Best Cookbooks of 2022, and the Food Network listed it as one of the “10 Best New Vegan Cookbooks” for 2023. VegNews listed Plant-Based India as one of the "Top 100 Vegan Cookbooks of All Time" in 2024.

It was also won the IVFF award in 2022, and was nominated for the 2023 James Beard Foundation Award - Vegetable Focused Cooking.

== Book ==
- Shukla, Sheil (2022). Plant-Based India: Nourishing Recipes Rooted in Tradition. The Experiment. p. 256. ISBN 978-1615198535.
