= St. Vincent's Medical Center Riverside =

Coordinates: 30.3076759°N 81.6904716°W

- St. Vincent's HealthCare
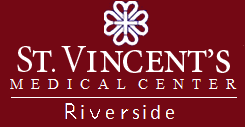

Geography
- Location: 2 Miles south of Downtown Jacksonville, on the west bank of the St. John's River, Jacksonville, Florida, United States

Organization
- Care system: Private
- Type: Community
- Affiliated university: Catholic

Services
- Beds: 528

History
- Opened: 1916

Links
- Website: www.jaxhealth.com
- Lists: Hospitals in Florida

In 1916, the Daughters of Charity of Saint Vincent de Paul launched a Catholic hospital called St. Vincent's Medical Center Riverside. They provide full-service tertiary care at a capacity of 528 beds.

This Catholic hospital is in Jacksonville, Florida. It is a member of Ascension and is owned by St. Vincent's HealthCare.

== Departments ==
=== Cardiology ===
St. Vincent's HealthCare runs a cardiovascular program that is expanding as a result of the recent opening of the Gary & Nancy Chartrand Heart and Vascular Center on the campus at St. Vincent's Medical Center.

Approximately 20,000 cardiovascular procedures are performed for patients each year—including diagnostic and non-invasive testing services, outpatient treatments, interventional procedures, and surgeries.

St. Vincent's was the first to perform open heart surgery in Jacksonville and now has the largest open-heart program in the region.

== Spine and Brain Institute ==
St. Vincent's Spine and Brain Institute provides care for Northeast Florida patients afflicted with neurological disorders. Within St. Vincent's Spine and Brain Institute, there are two main divisions, neurosurgery and neurology.

The neurosurgery division is for patients with neurological disorders that are best treated with surgery. The neurology division is for patients whose disorders can be treated without surgery.

=== Mary Virginia Terry Cancer Center ===
The St. Vincent's Mary Virginia Terry Cancer Center is a $20 million, 15,000-square-foot (1,400 m2) facility opened in 2006 that combines cancer services into one building adjacent to the medical center. The Cancer Center features a new Radiation Oncology Department.

The Walk of Hope is a walkway incorporating random features into the Cancer Center, including a boutique and a salon with services specially designed for cancer patients and their families.

=== Cancer treatment equipment and services ===
- Two state-of-the-art high-energy linear accelerators configured to deliver conventional and IMRT treatments; additionally, one of the accelerators has the capability of being upgraded to perform image-guided radiation therapy
- An 85 cm bore (oversized), multislice CT/simulator
- A brachytherapy high dose rate suite
- Library and Patient Information Center featuring two computers and the latest health-related information for patients
- Multidisciplinary Cancer Clinic where patients diagnosed with cancer can be seen by more than one specialist at one setting

=== Cancer research ===
St. Vincent's actively participates in a number of ongoing prevention and treatment trials including: the STAR study, the Prostate Cancer Prevention Trial, The National Surgical Adjuvant Breast and Bowel Project (a national cooperative study with the University of Kentucky), the Gynaecologic Oncology Group and various pharmaceutical sponsored studies.

=== Other departments ===
The Department of Pathology and Clinical Laboratory Services offers support to over 2000 outreach physician clients, and the laboratory outreach program, Consolidated Laboratory Services, serves more than just the Greater Jacksonville area. The School of Medical Technology also serves as a fully accredited internship program for Medical Technologists. The radiology department provides over 245,000 exams yearly and includes MRI, CT, ultrasound, nuclear medicine and positron emission tomography. Seton Center serves as an educational and healthcare resource for new parents and their babies. The Family Medicine Center located across the street from the Medical Center serves 30,000 patients a year and participates in the Vaccine for the Children Program, which is a national program that strives to achieve a 90% child immunization rate by age two. St. Catherine Laboure' Manor is a long-term care nursing home that also offers short-term rehabilitation services.

== The Teenage Auxiliary/Volunteer program ==
The Teenage Auxiliary/Volunteer Program is the modern-day version of the medical center's candy stripers program. Held in the summer, it gives an opportunity for teenagers ages 14–17 to help out in almost every area of the health system; see different aspects of the medical center; gain work experience; and meet others who are also interested in a medical related career. Positions are limited and given out in an orientation meeting after a mandatory interview at the human resources office in the main hospital. Applications are taken January.

== Graduate medical education ==
St. Vincent's Medical Center Riverside operates residency training programs for newly graduated physicians in the fields of family medicine, general pharmacy, and advanced critical care pharmacy.
