= James N. Weinstein =

American physician and executive

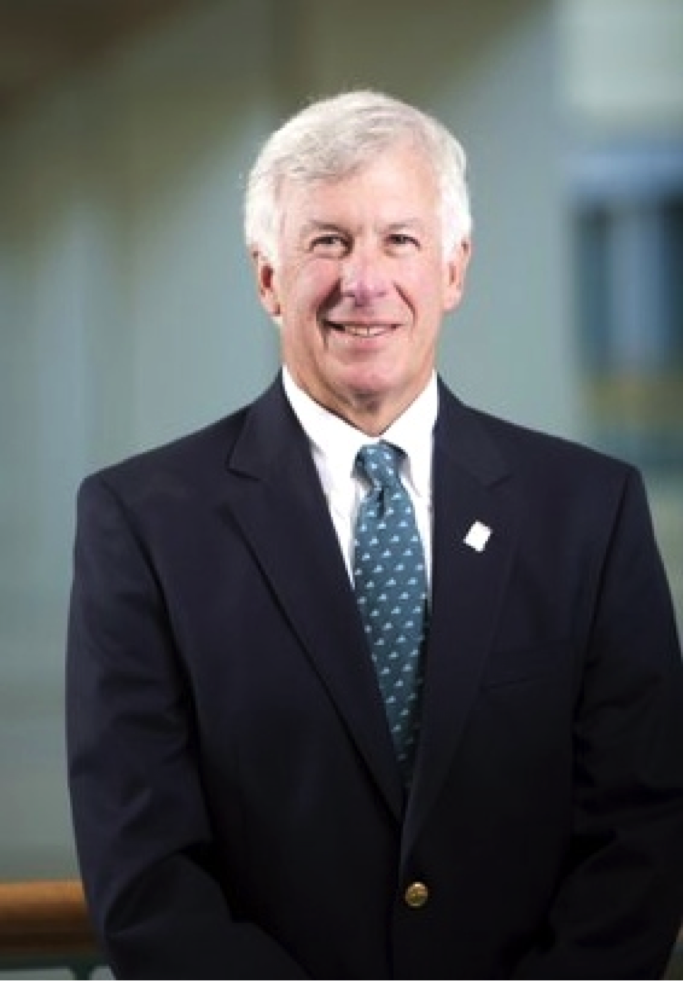
- Education: Doctor of Osteopathic Medicine
- Alma mater: Bradley University, Chicago College of Osteopathic Medicine
- Occupations: Physician and healthcare executive
- Employer: Microsoft

James N. Weinstein is the senior vice president for Microsoft Healthcare. Before joining Microsoft, he was the chief executive officer and president of Dartmouth–Hitchcock and the Dartmouth–Hitchcock Health System from 2010 until 2017. He is a member of the National Academy of Medicine and is on the organization's board for Population Health and Public Health Practice. He was the chair of the NAM Committee on Community Based Solutions to Promote Health Equity in the U.S.

== Education ==
Weinstein graduated from Bradley University with a Bachelor of Science degree in chemistry in 1972. He earned a Doctor of Osteopathic Medicine (D.O.) degree from Chicago College of Osteopathic Medicine in 1977.

In 1994–95, he was at the Dartmouth Medical School Center for the Evaluative Clinical Sciences and achieved an M.S. in health services research.
