= Douglas J. Robb =

United States Air Force general

Lieutenant General Douglas J. Robb DO
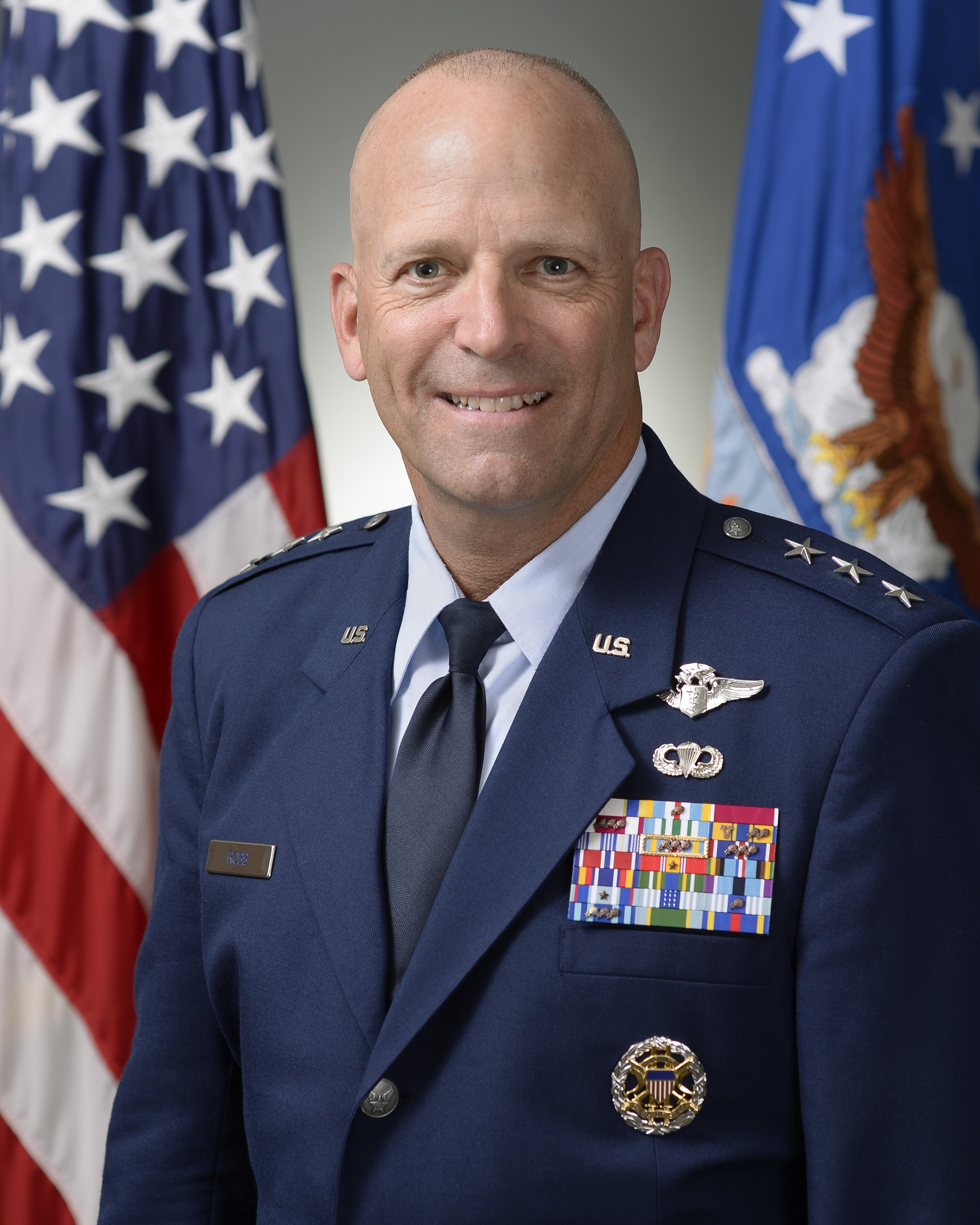
- Born: Douglas J. Robb
- Education: U.S. Air Force Academy; Chicago College of Osteopathic Medicine; National War College; Harvard School of Public Health
- Military career
- Allegiance: United States of America
- Branch: United States Air Force
- Service years: 1979–2016
- Rank: Lieutenant general
- Commands: Defense Health Agency; 10th Medical Group; 59th Aeromedical-Dental Group; 4404th Medical Group [provisional] 347th Aerospace Medicine Squadron
- Awards: Defense Distinguished Service Medal; Air Force Distinguished Service Medal; Defense Superior Service Medal (2); Legion of Merit

Douglas J. Robb is a retired United States Air Force lieutenant general who last served as the Director of the Defense Health Agency. Before that, he held several high-level health positions in the United States Department of Defense and Air Force, including terms as deputy director, Tricare Management Activity, the Joint Staff Surgeon, Command Surgeon of the Air Mobility Command (AMC) and Command Surgeon of the United States Central Command (USCENTCOM).

== Education ==
He graduated from Jesuit High School (Tampa). Received Bachelor of Science degree in biological sciences, U.S. Air Force Academy, in Colorado Springs, Colorado, in 1979; a medical degree from the Chicago College of Osteopathic Medicine in Illinois in 1984; a master's degree in public health in occupational medicine in 1992 from Harvard School of Public Health; did his residency and board certification in 1994 in aerospace medicine and occupational medicine at Brooks AFB, Texas; attended the National War College at Fort Lesley J. McNair in Washington, D.C., in 2000; studied Medical Executive Skills Capstone in Washington, D.C., in 2002; and attended the Interagency Institute for Federal Health Care Executives at George Washington University in Washington, D.C., in 2003.

== Military career ==
Robb graduated from the U.S. Air Force Academy and joined the Air Force in June 1979. He is board certified in aerospace medicine and practiced aerospace medicine in Air Force, joint and coalition aviation forces for 20 years. He was the chief of flight medicine, aerospace medicine squadron commander, and hospital and medical center commander. He was also the chief flight surgeon for U.S. Air Forces in Europe and Command Surgeon for the U.S. Central Command and Air Mobility Command. He has more than 1,600 flying hours on A-7, OV-10, F-16, C-9, C-130 and KC-135 aircraft. He was Command Surgeon at Headquarters Air Mobility Command on Scott Air Force Base in Illinois.

He became the 1st Director of the Defense Health Agency (DHA) on October 1, 2013, and served in the role until October 2015. After being relieved by Vice Admiral Raquel C. Bono in a change of command ceremony, Robb retired from the military effective January 1, 2016.

== Assignments ==
1. June 1979–August 1980, maintenance officer, 13th Tactical Fighter Squadron, MacDill AFB, Fla.
2. September 1980–June 1984, student, Chicago College of Osteopathic Medicine, Ill.
3. July 1984–June 1985, family practice resident, Carswell Regional Hospital, Carswell AFB, Texas.
4. July 1985–July 1987, flight surgeon, 429th Tactical Fighter Squadron and 4450th Tactical Group, Nellis AFB, Nev.
5. August 1987–August 1988, flight surgeon, 19th Tactical Air Squadron, Osan Air Base, South Korea.
6. September 1988–August 1991, flight surgeon, 526th Fighter Squadron, Ramstein AB, Germany.
7. September 1991–June 1992, student, Harvard School of Public Health, Cambridge, Mass.
8. July 1992–July 1994, medical resident, Aerospace Medicine, Brooks AFB, Texas.
9. August 1994–June 1997, Commander, 347th Aerospace Medicine Squadron, Moody AFB, Ga. (June 1996–July 1996, Commander, 4404th Medical Group [provisional], Southwest Asia).
10. July 1997–July 1999, Chief, Aerospace Medicine, Office of the Surgeon General, Headquarters U.S. Air Forces in Europe, Ramstein AB, Germany.
11. August 1999–July 2000, student, National War College, Fort Lesley J. McNair, Washington, D.C.
12. June 2000–July 2002, Commander, 59th Aeromedical-Dental Group, Lackland AFB, Texas.
13. July 2002–June 2004, Commander, 10th Medical Group, and Command Surgeon, U.S. Air Force Academy, Colorado Springs, Colo.
14. June 2004–June 2007, Command Surgeon, U.S. Central Command, MacDill AFB, Fla.
15. July 2007–July 2008, Commander, 81st Medical Group, Keesler AFB, Miss.
16. July 2008–August 2010, Command Surgeon, Air Mobility Command, Scott AFB, Ill.
17. September 2010–June 2013, Joint Staff Surgeon, Office of the chairman, Joint Chiefs of Staff, the Pentagon, Washington, D.C.
18. July 2013–September 2013, deputy director, TRICARE Management Activity, Defense Health Headquarters, Falls Church, Va.
19. October 2013–October 2015, Director, Defense Health Agency, Defense Health Headquarters, Falls Church, Va.

== Awards and decorations ==
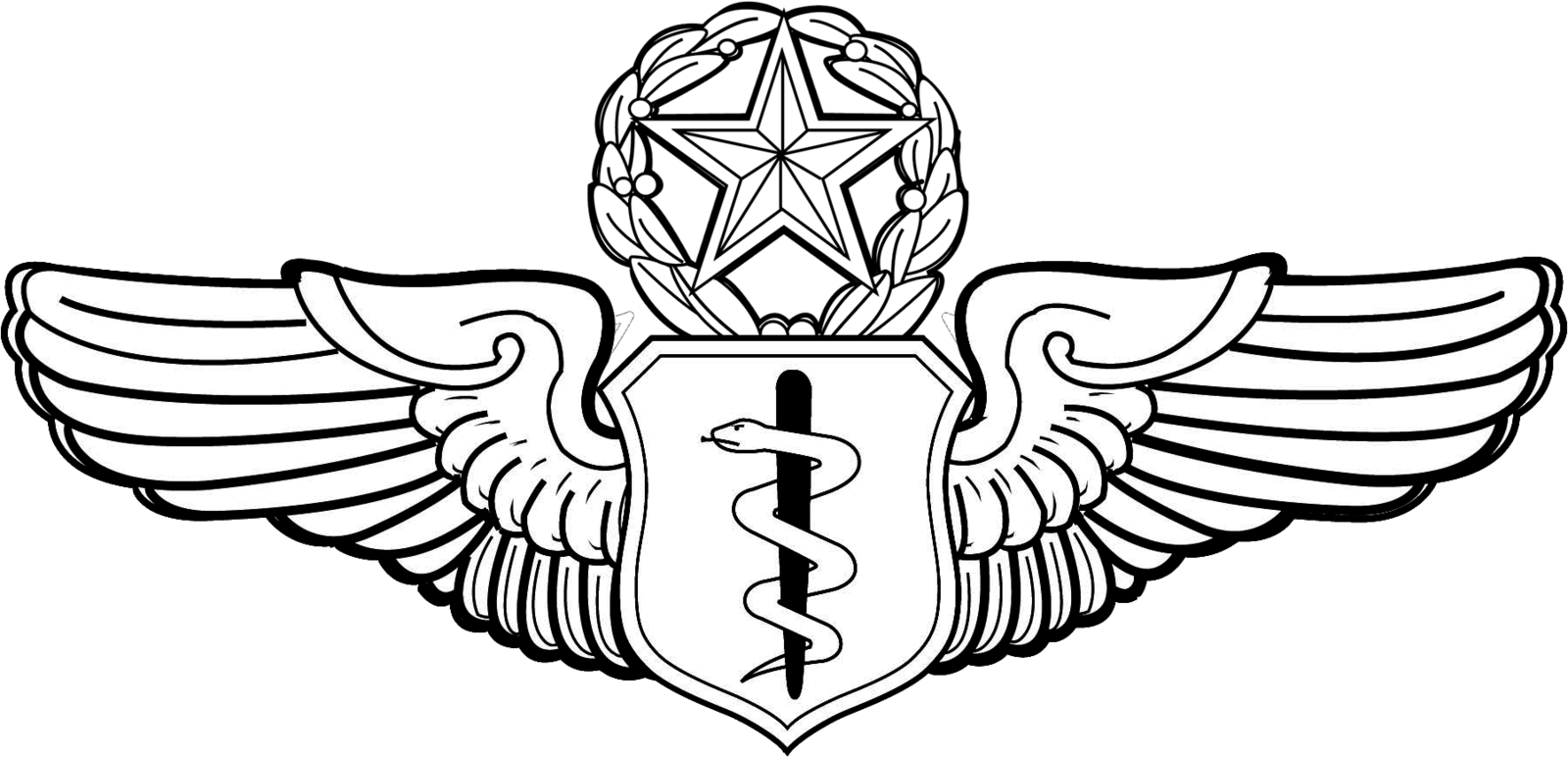

U.S. Air Force Chief Flight Surgeon Badge
Basic Parachutist Badge
Defense Distinguished Service Medal
| Air Force Distinguished Service Medal | Defense Superior Service Medal w/ 1 bronze oak leaf cluster | Legion of Merit |
| Meritorious Service Medal w/ 3 bronze oak leaf clusters | Joint Service Commendation Medal | Air Force Commendation Medal w/ 2 bronze oak leaf clusters and Combat V |
| Air Force Achievement Medal | Joint Meritorious Unit Award w/ 3 bronze oak leaf clusters | Air Force Outstanding Unit Award w/ 3 bronze oak leaf clusters |
| Air Force Organizational Excellence Award | National Defense Service Medal w/ 1 bronze service star | Armed Forces Expeditionary Medal |
| Global War on Terrorism Service Medal | Korea Defense Service Medal | Humanitarian Service Medal |
| Air and Space Campaign Medal w/ 1 bronze service star | Air Force Overseas Short Tour Service Ribbon | Air Force Overseas Long Tour Service Ribbon w/ 1 bronze oak leaf cluster |
| Air Force Longevity Service Award w/ 1 bronze and 2 silver oak leaf clusters | Air Force Small Arms Expert Marksmanship Ribbon | Air Force Training Ribbon |
Office of the Joint Chiefs of Staff Identification Badge

== Effective dates of promotion ==
| Rank | Date |
|---|---|
| Second lieutenant | May 30, 1979 |
| Captain | Nov. 30, 1983 |
| Major | Nov. 30, 1989 |
| Lieutenant colonel | Nov. 30, 1995 |
| Colonel | May 30, 2000 |
| Brigadier general | June 1, 2007 |
| Major general | Aug. 3, 2009 |
| Lieutenant general | Oct. 1, 2013 |

Military offices
| New office | Director of the Defense Health Agency; 2013–2015 | Succeeded by Raquel C. Bono |
