= Mercedes Soler (journalist) =

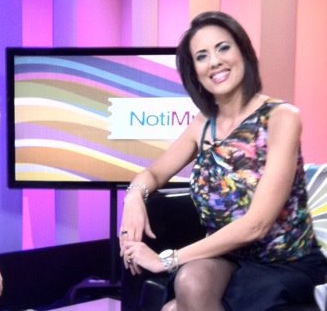
- Soler on Notimujer set, which she hosted from 2010-13.

Mercedes Soler is co-owner and President of Solmart Media a Spanish radio and digital media company in Sarasota, Florida, founded with her husband Tomás Martínez. Solmart Media's core mission is to entertain, inform, educate and elevate its underserved community. Their two FM and one AM radio stations reach 9 counties, and about half a million Hispanics. Mercedes oversees editorial content, outreach, advocacy, marketing, public relations, productions for non-profits, internships and mentoring.

Prior to this, she spent 25 years as a Spanish language international correspondent with Univisión and an anchor for CNN Español. She also wrote weekly columns for El Nuevo Herald and co-authored the book Dish & Tell: Life, Love and Secrets [HarperCollins]. The book was adapted to the stage as a musical. In addition, Mercedes taught journalism to international Spanish language students through the University of Miami and coached media and press strategies to U.S. diplomats based in Latin America, as a subcontractor for the State Department.

Mercedes serves on the board of directors at the John and Mabel Ringling Museum of Art, the Community Foundation of Sarasota County and Campowerment's Give her Camp. She is on the Advisory Committee of ISLAC, the University of South Florida Institute for the Study of Latin America and the Caribbean and a member of the International Women's Forum. Ms. Soler is the recipient of 5 Emmy Awards, 1 Peabody and 1 GLAAD award, among other accolades. Her most valuable title is that of mamá to Victoria and Thomas, who are both pursuing post graduate degrees in Philanthropic Management and Law, respectively.

== Biography ==
Mercedes was born in Havana, where she lived until age nine. Her parents, wanting to spare their four daughters from a repressive communist dictatorship, moved the family to Spain before eventually settling in Chicago. There, she graduated high school and from Loyola University. Mercedes considers herself a news junkie, an avid reader and a foodie. Visiting beaches, mountains and art museums are a passion. She and her husband collect Cuban art.

Soler worked for Univisión as a senior correspondent and anchor, covering stories in the United States and Latin America. Her stories included the September 11th terrorist attacks, the Space Shuttle Columbia disaster and the funerals of Celia Cruz and María Felix.

Soler joined CNN en Español in October 2010.

Soler has interviewed Latin American presidents Alberto Fujimori, Miguel de la Madrid, Carlos Menem, Violeta Chamorro, Arnoldo Alemán, Abdalá Bucaram, Gustavo Noboa and Ernesto Samper, as well as drug kingpin Carlos Lehder.

She has received five Emmy Awards as well as 15 nominations.
