= Eddie Slowikowski =

Eddie Slowikowski (born 26 July 1967) is a former NCAA All-American runner, now known as a professional speaker, author. Eddie began his speaking career in 1992, focusing on the areas of Empowerment and Leadership. He is known for a high-energy presentation style that incorporates his signature dance moves. In 1997, he founded the LifeRide Leadership Camp, which is conducted every summer and dedicated to "empowering youth for the journey of their lives." Eddie's first book, "LifeRide: The Ultimate Rollercoaster", was published by iUniverse in 2004.

== Running career ==
Eddie was a 3-time NCAA All-American in track and cross country while attending Loyola University Chicago. He also represented the United States at the 1987 Pan Am games, the 1992 Olympic Trials and was a USA Gold Medal winner in international competition in London, England. In a 1990 race at Madison Square Garden, Eddie ran 3:58 for the fastest college indoor mile that year. He was inducted into the Loyola Athletic Hall of Fame in 1998.
