= Terry Fulmer =

American gerontologist

- Born: Pittsburgh, Pennsylvania, United States
- Education: Boston College (Ph.D., M.S.); Skidmore College (B.S.); New York University (Post-Master's Certificate)
- Partner: Keith
- Children: 3
- Scientific career
- Fields: Geriatrics and elder abuse research

Teresa Thomas "Terry" Fulmer, is an American gerontologist and the previous president of The John A. Hartford Foundation. Earlier positions include distinguished professor and dean of the Bouvé College of Health Sciences at Northeastern University and dean of the College of Nursing at New York University. She is known for her extensive research in geriatrics and elder abuse. She has received funding from the National Institute on Aging, the National Institute of Nursing Research and other foundations for her research regarding elder abuse.

== Education ==
Fulmer received her Bachelor of Science in Nursing from Skidmore College in 1975. In 1977, she received her Master of Science in Nursing, graduating magna cum laude from Boston College, and, in 1983, received her Ph.D. in higher education administration from the same institution, graduating with distinguished honors. In 2001, she received her post-master's certificate as a geriatric nurse practitioner from New York University. She previously has held certification in gerontological nursing from the American Nurses Credentialing Center (1978–2014) and was a Brookdale National Fellow at Columbia University.

== Career ==
In 1977, Fulmer became an instructor of rehabilitation nursing at Salem State College. Between 1980 and 1987, she filled many roles at Boston College, including assistant professor of nursing. She continued her academic career with various other positions, from lectureship invitations to faculty appointments. These appointments spanned many prestigious institutions including Harvard University, Case Western Reserve University, Yale University, Columbia University, New York University, University of Pennsylvania and Northeastern University. Notable positions include the Anna C. Maxwell Chair and associate dean for Research of the College of Nursing at Columbia University (1992–1995) and The Erline Perkins McGriff Professor and dean of the College of Nursing at New York University (2005–2011). From 2011 to 2014, she was the dean of the Bouvé College of Health Sciences as well as a professor of nursing and public policy/urban affairs in the College of Social Sciences and Humanities at Northeastern University.

In 2015, Fulmer became the president of The John A. Hartford Foundation (JAHF) in New York City, a foundation focused on improving the care of older adults. In addition to her role as the chief strategist for advancing the foundation's goals, she is on many committees and boards, with the purpose of reframing the culture of aging and promoting age-friendly health systems. She is the first nurse to have been on the board of the American Geriatrics Society. She is also the first nurse to have been president of the Gerontological Society of America, which awarded her the Donald P. Kent Award in 2019 for exemplifying the highest standards for professional leadership in the field of aging. In 2020, she was selected to the independent Coronavirus Commission for Safety and Quality in Nursing Homes established to advise the Centers for Medicare and Medicaid Services on the COVID-19 crisis. She is an elected member of the National Academy of Medicine (NAM), where she also takes part in the Forum on Aging, Disability, and Independence. She is currently a trustee for the Josiah Macy Jr. Foundation, Springer Publishing Company and the Bassett Healthcare System. She has previously been the chair of the National Advisory Committee for the Robert Wood Johnson Foundation Executive Nurse Fellows Program, and held board positions at Skidmore College, the Institute for Healthcare Improvement, the Geriatrics and Gerontology Advisory Committee for the U.S. Department of Veterans Affairs, and the advisory board for the Hong Kong Polytechnic University School of Nursing.

== Awards and recognition ==
As a leading expert in geriatrics, Fulmer has been nationally and internationally recognized for her work, especially the development of the NICHE program and Age-Friendly Health System movement. She is the recipient of many prestigious awards. PBS's Next Avenue selected her as one of its top 50 "Influencers in Aging". In 2016, she received the Award for Exceptional Service to The New York Academy of Medicine for her distinguished service on the academy's board of trustees, including as vice-chair and her engagement in the academy's policy initiatives. In 2017, the American Society on Aging awarded her the Rosalie S. Wolf Award for her work on elder abuse. Her research in elder abuse and neglect has been funded by the National Institute on Aging and the National Institute of Nursing Research. She is also recognized as a Distinguished Practitioner of the National Academies of Practice and has written over 150 peer-reviewed papers and edited over 23 books.

== Selected works ==
- Fulmer, Terry; Chernof, Bruce (2018). Handbook of Geriatric Assessment (5th ed.). Burlington, Massachusetts: Jones and Bartlet Learning. ISBN 978-1284144307.
- Fulmer, T. (2018). "The Rosalie Wolf Memorial Lecture: Abuse-free Care in a World of Age-friendly Health Systems". Journal of Elder Abuse & Neglect. 14 (3): 1–9. doi:10.1080/08946566.2018.1452658. PMID 29630458. S2CID 4804875.
- Fulmer, T.; Li, N. (2018). "Age-Friendly Health Systems for Older Adults with Dementia". The Journal for Nurse Practitioners. 14 (3): 160–165. doi:10.1016/j.nurpra.2017.09.001.
- Fulmer, Terry; Mate, Kedar; Berman, Amy (2018). "The age-friendly health system imperative". Journal of the American Geriatrics Society. 66 (1): 22–24. doi:10.1111/jgs.15076. PMID 28876455. S2CID 8901552.
- Blumenthal, D.; Chernof, B.; Fulmer, T.; Lumpkin, J.; Selberg, J. (2016). "Caring for High-Need, High-Cost Patients - An Urgent Priority". New England Journal of Medicine. 375 (10): 909–911. doi:10.1056/NEJMp1608511. PMID 27602661.
- Fulmer, Terry (2016). "Effective Interdisciplinary Teams: Do We Really Know How to Build Them?". Generations. 40: 64–70.
- Fulmer, T.; Gibbons, M. (2016). "Joyce Clifford the Scholar: In Her Own Words". Advances in Nursing Science. 38 (4): 347–354. doi:10.1097/ANS.0000000000000093. PMID 26517343. S2CID 29961874.
- Fulmer, Terry; Foreman, Marquis; Walker, Mary; Montgomery, Kristen (15 August 2011). Critical Care Nursing Of The Elderly (2nd ed.). New York, New York: Springer Publishing Company. ISBN 978-0826114099.
- Gallo, Joseph; Bogner, Hillary; Fulmer, Terry; Paveza, Gregory (2006). Handbook of Geriatric Assessment (4th ed.). Gaithersburg, Maryland: Aspen Publications. ISBN 978-0763730567.
- Fitzpatrick, Joyce; Fulmer, Terry; Wallace, Meredith; Flaherty, Ellen (2000). Geriatric Nursing Research Digest. New York, New York: Springer Publishing Company. ISBN 978-0826113320.

== Honors ==
- 1989 Fellow of American Academy of Nursing
- 1990 Fellow of The Gerontological Society of America
- 1990 Distinguished Practitioner of National Academy of Practice
- 2004 Dennis W. Jahnigen Memorial Award, American Geriatrics Society
- 2010 Nurse Leader in Aging Award, American Academy of Nursing
- 2010 The Doris Schwartz Gerontological Nursing Research Award, The Gerontological Society of America
- 2010 Institute of Medicine - Elected Member
- 2012 The William C. McInnes Award for Professional Excellence, The Boston College Alumni Association
- 2014 Lifetime Achievement Award, National Gerontological Nurses Association
- 2016 Influencer in Aging Award, Next Avenue
- 2018 Honorary Doctoral Degree in Nursing from the University of South Florida
- 2019 Donald P. Kent Award
- 2021 Honorary Doctorate from St. Lawrence University
- 2021 The Dean Rita P Kelleher Award, Connell School of Nursing, Boston College
- 2021 Living Legend of the American Academy of Nursing
- 2022 Champion for Change Award, The Weinberg Center, Hebrew Home for the Aged in Riverdale
