= List of serial killers in the United Kingdom =

A serial killer is typically a person who murders three or more people, with the murders taking place over more than a month and including a significant period of time between them. The British Centre for Crime and Justice Studies defines a serial killer when an individual has killed three or more people who were previously unknown to him or her, with a ‘cooling off’ period between each murder. This definition is accepted by both police and academic experts and therefore provides a useful frame of reference.

== England ==
Name	Years active	Proven victims	Possible victims	Status	Notes	Ref
Akinmurele, Stephen	1995–1998	8	8	Committed suicide before trial	Known as "The Cul-de-sac killer"; a British-Nigerian man suspected of killing elderly people in Blackpool and the Isle of Man	
Allitt, Beverley	1991	4	4	Sentenced to life imprisonment	Known as "The Angel of Death"; Lincolnshire paediatric nurse who killed children in her care	
Balls, Jonathan	1824–1845	22	22+	Committed suicide prior to identification	Poisoned relatives and acquaintances with arsenic in Happisburgh	
Bellfield, Levi	2002–2004	3	3+	Sentenced to life imprisonment with a whole life order	Known as "The Bus Stop Stalker"; convicted of the 2002 murder of Amanda Dowler and two fatal hammer attacks on young women in South West London.	
Bierton, Lawrence	1995–2023	3	3	Sentenced to life imprisonment with a whole life order	Killed two elderly sisters in Rotherham in 1995. In 2023 he was convicted of a third murder he committed while released on licence.	
Bishop, John	1830	3	3	Executed in 1831	Leader of "The London Burkers"; together with Thomas Williams and two accomplices, formed a gang of body snatchers that drugged and killed victims for money	
Bourne, Geordie	1590s–1597	7	7	Executed in 1597	Scottish bandit who killed seven people around the East English Marches	
Brady, Ian	1963–1965	5	5	Died in prison	Committed the so-called Moors murders with girlfriend Myra Hindley, killing five children and burying four of their bodies on Saddleworth Moor	
Britland, Mary Ann	1886	3	3	Executed in 1886	Poisoned her daughter, husband, and the wife of her lover in 1886; first woman to be executed by hanging at Strangeways Prison	
Brumfitt, Paul	1979–1999	3	3	Sentenced to life imprisonment	Strangled two men, one in Tilbury and another in Denmark, in 1979; sentenced to life, but released in 1994, and later killed a prostitute in Woodsetton in 1999.	
Bryan, Peter	1993–2004	3	3	Sentenced to life imprisonment	Institutionalized for fatal hammer attack on woman in 1993; re-apprehended for cannibalizing a friend in 2004, but able to batter a fellow patient to death months later	
Burgess, David	1966–1967	3	3	Sentenced to 27 years imprisonment	Murdered three young girls in Beenham; originally convicted of two murders, he was released in 1996, only to be convicted of the third murder in 2012 after new DNA evidence was found.	
Chapman, George	1897–1902	3	3	Executed in 1903	Known as "The Borough Poisoner"; Polish-born barber who poisoned his wives in London's East End	
Childs, John	1974–1978	6	6	Sentenced to life imprisonment with a whole life order	Apparent contract killer who killed six people in East London, although none of the bodies were ever found	
Christie, John	1943–1953	8	8+	Executed in 1953	Known as "The Rillington Place Strangler"; gassed, raped and strangled at least five women from 1943 to 1953, hiding the bodies at his house in Notting Hill, London; also strangled his wife Ethel, as well as the wife and baby daughter of neighbour Timothy Evans, who was wrongfully executed for their murders.	
Chua, Victorino	2011	3	7	Sentenced to life imprisonment	Nurse at Stepping Hill Hospital who poisoned patients with insulin	
Cotton, Mary Ann	1852–1872	21	21+	Executed in 1873	Poisoned family members and acquaintances for their insurance policies	
Cream, Thomas Neill	1881–1892	5	5+	Executed in 1892	Known as "The Lambeth Poisoner"; Scottish-Canadian doctor who poisoned women with strychnine in the United States and then England	
Cummins, Gordon	1941–1942	4	6	Executed in 1942	Known as "The Blackout Ripper"; RAF pilot who murdered four women in London during the wartime blackout in 1942, and suspect in two previous murders from 1941	
Dawson, Andrew	1981–2010	3	3	Sentenced to life imprisonment with a whole life order	"The Angel of Mercy"; stabbed three men to death with no provocation	
Dennehy, Joanna	2013	3	3	Sentenced to life imprisonment with a whole life order	Stabbed three men to death and tried to kill two others selected at random in what became known as the "Peterborough ditch murders".	
Duffy, John	1985–1986	3	3	Sentenced to life imprisonment with a whole life order	Together with accomplice David Mulcahy, known as "The Railway Rapists"; killed three women near railway stations in Southern England	
Dyer, Amelia	1869–1896	6	400+	Executed in 1896	Known as "The Ogress of Reading"; baby farmer who murdered infants in her care	
Erskine, Kenneth	1986	7	11	Sentenced to life imprisonment	Known as "The Stockwell Strangler"; gerontophile who murdered elderly citizens in London	
Grieveson, Steven	1990–1994	4	4+	Sentenced to life imprisonment	Known as "The Sunderland Strangler"; murdered four teenage boys in Sunderland	
Griffiths, Stephen	2009–2010	3	3+	Sentenced to life imprisonment with a whole life order	Known as "The Crossbow Cannibal"; convicted of murdering three prostitutes in Bradford	
Haigh, John	1944–1949	6	9	Executed in 1949	Known as "The Acid Bath Murderer"; murdered people for money and then dissolved their bodies in sulphuric acid	
Hardy, Anthony	2000–2002	3	8+	Died in prison	Known as "The Camden Ripper"; abducted, murdered and dismembered women across London	
Hardy, Trevor	1974–1976	3	3	Died in prison	Known as "The Beast of Manchester"; killed three teenage girls in Manchester	
Herbert, Philip	1678–1680	3	3	Died a free man	Nobleman known for assaulting and sometimes killing fellow peers for no discernible reason; although he faced lesser charges, research indicates that he was responsible for all the murders attributed to him	
Hindley, Myra	1963–1965	5	5	Died in prison	Committed the so-called Moors murders with boyfriend Ian Brady, killing five children and burying four of their bodies on Saddleworth Moor	
Ireland, Colin	1993	5	5	Died in prison	Known as "The Gay Slayer"; killed five gay men in London to seek attention from the media	
Jebson, Ronald	1970–1974	3	3	Died in prison	Paedophile responsible for the 1970 Babes in the Wood murders and the murder of another child	
Johnson, Theodore	1981–2016	3	3	Sentenced to 30 years imprisonment	Jamaican immigrant who murdered his wife and two girlfriends	
Lee, Bruce George Peter	1973–1979	12	26	Sentenced to involuntary commitment	Arsonist responsible for multiple deaths during acts of arson in Kingston upon Hull; some convictions have been quashed	
Letby, Lucy	2015–2016	7	7+	Sentenced to life imprisonment with a whole life order	NHS nurse convicted of killing 7 babies and attempting to kill 6 others whilst working as a neonatal nurse at Countess of Chester Hospital	
Ligus, Robin	1994–1996	3	4	Died in prison	Drug addict convicted of robbing and bludgeoning three men to death with an iron bar in Shropshire	
Lupo, Michael	1985–1986	4	4	Died in prison	Known as "The Wolf Man"; Italian immigrant who killed fellow gay men in London	
Mackay, Patrick	1974–1975	3	11	Sentenced to life imprisonment	Thrill killer who killed people during thefts and robberies	
Martin, Mark	2004–2005	3	3	Sentenced to life imprisonment with a whole life order	Known as "The Sneinton Strangler"; murdered homeless women in Nottingham with two accomplices to become famous	
Maudsley, Robert	1974–1978	4	4	Sentenced to life imprisonment with a whole life order	Killed a man in London, and later two cellmates in prison and one fellow patient in Broadmoor Hospital	
Morris, Raymond Leslie	1965–1967	3	3	Died in prison	Raped and murdered prepubescent girls and left their corpses on Cannock Chase.	
Mulcahy, David	1985–1986	3	3	Sentenced to life imprisonment	Together with accomplice John Duffy, known as "The Railway Rapists"; killed three women near railway stations in Southern England	
Napper, Robert	1992–1993	3	3	Sentenced to involuntary commitment	Known as "The Green Chain Rapist"; raped, murdered and mutilated women and children	
Neilson, Donald	1971–1975	4	4	Died in prison	Known as "The Black Panther"; killed post office clerks and heiress Lesley Whittle	
Nilsen, Dennis	1978–1983	12	15	Died in prison	Known as "The Muswell Hill Murderer"; lured and murdered young men at his flat in London, ritually dissecting their bodies post-mortem	
Norris, Colin	2002	4	10	Sentenced to life imprisonment	Scottish nurse who poisoned elderly patients he considered "difficult" at a hospital in Leeds	
Port, Stephen	2014–2015	4	4	Sentenced to life imprisonment with a whole life order	Known as "The Grindr Killer"; serial rapist who drugged, sexually assaulted and murdered men in Barking, London that he met on dating apps	
Robinson, Maxine	1989-1993	3	3	Sentenced to life imprisonment with a minimum tariff of 10 years. Increased by 3 years in 2004	Murdered her three children over a span of 4 years claiming their deaths had been natural, until she confessed to smothering them in their sleep.	
Sach, Amelia	1900–1902	20	20+	Executed in 1903	Together with accomplice Annie Walters, known as "The Finchley Baby Farmers"; murdered infants placed in their care	
Shipman, Harold	1975–1998	218	250+	Committed suicide in prison	Known as "Dr Death"; general practitioner who murdered patients placed in his care; only British doctor to be convicted of such charges. Convicted of 15 murders and responsible for the deaths of 218 patients identified by inquiry, but is believed to have killed around 250 people.	
Smith, George Joseph	1912–1914	3	3	Executed in 1915	Bigamist who murdered three women by drowning them in his bath in what became known as the "Brides in the Bath Murders"	
Smith, Rebecca	1830s–1849	8	8	Executed in 1849	Poisoned eight of her newborn children; last British woman to be executed for infanticide of her own child	
Straffen, John	1951–1952	3	3	Died in prison	Murdered a young girl to get revenge on police; confined to mental hospital, escaped and killed two others	
Sutcliffe, Peter	1975–1980	13	14+	Died in prison	Known as "The Yorkshire Ripper"; murdered women around West Yorkshire and Manchester; the manhunt for him was one of the most extensive and expensive in British history	
Walters, Annie	1900–1902	20	20+	Executed in 1903	Together with accomplice Amelia Sach, known as "The Finchley Baby Farmers"; murdered infants placed in their care	
West, Fred	1967–1987	12	13+	Committed suicide before trial	Together with his wife Rose, known as "The House of Horrors Murderers"; tortured and murdered teenage girls and young women around Gloucestershire; Fred committed some separate killings on his own	
West, Rose	1971–1987	10	10	Sentenced to life imprisonment with a whole life order	Together with her husband Fred, known as "The House of Horrors Murderers"; tortured and murdered teenage girls and young women around Gloucestershire	
Williams, Thomas	1830	3	3	Executed in 1831	Member of "The London Burkers"; together with John Bishop and two accomplices, formed a gang of body snatchers that drugged and killed victims for money	
Wright, Steven	1999–2006	6	6+	Sentenced to life imprisonment with a whole life order	Known as "The Suffolk Strangler"; killed five women in six weeks around Ipswich, later linked to an earlier murder in Felixstowe	
Young, Graham	1962–1971	3	3+	Died in prison	Known as "The Teacup Poisoner"; poisoned school friends and family at age fourteen in 1961, killing his stepmother in 1962. Detained at Broadmoor Hospital. Released in 1971, he began poisoning coworkers, murdering two. His case sparked debate on the treatment of mentally-ill offenders, leading to legislation being passed	

== Northern Ireland ==
Name	Years active	Proven victims	Possible victims	Status	Notes	Ref
Shankill Butchers	1975–1982	23	23+	Various	Ulster loyalist gang who murdered people in sectarian attacks	
Murphy, Lenny	1972–1982	11 (not including Shankill Butchers murders)	34+ (including Shankill Butchers murders)	Shot dead by Provisional IRA gunmen on 16 November 1982	Leader of the Loyalist Shankill Butchers death squad. He killed as part of the gang but also on his own prior to its establishment	

== Scotland ==
Name	Years active	Proven victims	Possible victims	Status	Notes	Ref
Black, Robert	1981–1986	4	4+	Died in prison	Paedophilic lorry driver who raped and murdered underage girls across the UK; suspected in other murders across several European countries	
Burke, William	1828	16	16	Executed in 1829	Irish immigrant who killed people and sold their corpses for money along with accomplice William Hare	
Hall, Archibald	1977–1978	5	5	Died in prison	Known as "The Monster Butler"; murdered people to cover up his crimes while working as a butler for British aristocracy, some with the help of accomplice Michael Kitto	
Hare, William	1828	16	16	Unknown; died after 1829	Irish immigrant who killed people and sold their corpses for money along with accomplice William Burke	
Manuel, Peter	1956–1958	7	9	Executed in 1958	Known as "The Beast of Birkenshaw"; American-born killer who murdered people across Lanarkshire	
Mone, Robert	1967–1976	4	4	Sentenced to life imprisonment	Raped and murdered a teacher; later escaped from a mental hospital and killed three more people	
Sinclair, Angus	1961–1978	4	8+	Died in prison	Raped and murdered young women in Edinburgh and Glasgow; his case prompted significant changes to the double jeopardy laws in the UK	
Tobin, Peter	1991–2006	3	3+	Died in prison	Sex offender who raped and murdered young women in Scotland and England; suspect in numerous violent crimes dating back to the late 1960s	

== Wales ==
Name	Years active	Proven victims	Possible victims	Status	Notes	Ref
Cooper, John	1985–1998	4	9	Sentenced to life imprisonment with a whole life order	Known as "The Bullseye Killer"; committed two double murders in Pembrokeshire; suspected in other murders and numerous sexual assaults	
Kappen, Joseph	1973	3	4+	Died prior to identification	Known as "The Saturday Night Strangler"; raped and murdered three teenage girls in Llandarcy and Tonmawr; first serial killer to be posthumously identified via familial DNA profiling	
Moore, Peter	1995	4	4	Sentenced to life imprisonment with a whole life order	Known as "The Man in Black"; English cinema owner who stabbed men to death "for fun" in Denbighshire and Anglesey. Moore also committed at least 39 sexual assaults on men in North Wales and the Merseyside area over a 20-year period	

== Unidentified serial killers ==
Name	Years active	Proven victims	Possible victims	Regions where active	Notes	Ref
Bible John	1968–1969	3	3	Glasgow	Murdered three young women he met at the Barrowland Ballroom in Glasgow; nickname derived from his repeated quotations from the Bible	
Jack the Ripper	1888	5	20	Greater London	Murdered prostitutes in London's Whitechapel area of the East End, mutilating their bodies after death	
Jack the Stripper	1964–1965	6	8	Greater London	Strangled prostitutes in West London and dumped their bodies in and near to the River Thames	
Thames Torso Murderer	1887–1889	4	4+	Greater London	Murdered prostitutes around London, then dismembered their remains and dumped them into the River Thames; some speculate that these killings were committed by Jack the Ripper, but this has not been confirmed	

== See also ==
- Lists of serial killers
- List of serial killers by country

== Bibliography ==
- Burkhalter Chmelir, Sandra (2003). "Serial Killers". In Robert Kastenbaum (ed.). Macmillan Encyclopedia of Death and Dying. Vol. 2. New York: Macmillan Reference USA/Thomson/Gale. p. 1. Archived from the original on 3 May 2009.
- Morton, RJ (2005). "Serial murder multi-disciplinary perspectives for investigators" (PDF). Federal Bureau of Investigation.
- Hollandsworth, Skip (2015). The Midnight Assassin (1st ed.). New York: Henry Holt. p. 81. ISBN 978-0-8050-9767-2.
- Lane, Brian; Gregg, Wilfred (1995) [1992]. The Encyclopedia Of Serial Killers. New York City: Berkley Book. ISBN 0-425-15213-8.
