= Endeavor Swedish Hospital =

Coordinates: 41°58′31.3″N 87°41′57.9″W

- Endeavor Health

Geography
- Location: Chicago, Illinois, United States

Organization
- Type: Nonprofit teaching hospital
- Affiliated university: Midwestern University, North Park University, St George's, University of London

Services
- Beds: 312 licensed beds

History
- Former names: Home of Mercy; Swedish Covenant Hospital
- Opened: 1886; 140 years ago

Links
- Website: www.endeavorhealth.org/locations/swedish-hospital
- Lists: Hospitals in the United States

Endeavor Swedish Hospital (formerly Swedish Covenant Hospital) is a 312-bed nonprofit teaching hospital located on the north side of Chicago, Illinois. The hospital offers over 50 medical specialties, including neurosurgery for the spine and brain, integrative cancer care, heart services (including electrophysiology), women's health services, childbirth and emergency services. The hospital has more than 600 physicians and 2,500 employees. The hospital is accredited by the American Osteopathic Association's Healthcare Facilities Accreditation Program.

Swedish Hospital was founded in 1886, and historically affiliated with the Evangelical Covenant Church (also called, Swedish Covenant church, as its members in the 19th century were primarily Swedish). It has been part of Endeavor Health since 2019.

== History ==
Swedish Covenant Hospital was founded as the Home of Mercy on April 1, 1886, by the Swedish Evangelical Covenant Church Mission Friends.

In 1899, the hospital began a nurse training program. By 1923, fifty doctors had joined the staff and the hospital had earned recognition by both the American Medical Association and the American College of Surgeons.

In 1903, the hospital completed its first expansion with the construction of Delano Hall.

In 2004, Swedish Covenant Hospital became a member of the Planetree Alliance, an organization that develops and implements guidelines for patient-centered care. The hospital maintained its membership until 2009.

In 2012, a lawsuit was filed against Swedish Covenant that garnered national attention after it was reported on by the Associated Press. The suit alleged that the hospital failed to meet its mission by not providing adequate free or reduced cost care to two low-income uninsured patients.

In March 2014, Swedish Covenant Hospital became affiliated with St George's, University of London.

In the fall of 2014, Swedish Covenant Hospital opened the Mayora Rosenberg Women's Health Center. In November 2014, Swedish Covenant Hospital announced a partnership with Land of Lincoln Health (LLH) and began offering medical insurance plans to individuals and small businesses.

In June 2015, Swedish Covenant Hospital opened its first immediate care center in Chicago's Sauganash neighborhood. In November 2015, Mark Newton announced his intentions to step down as president and CEO of the company in June 2016. He was replaced by Anthony Guaccio, who was previously the chief operating officer of the company.

In May 2016, Swedish Covenant Hospital's Nurse-Midwifery Group announced the launch of a CenteringPregnancy program, allowing expecting mothers with similar due dates and their providers to develop long-lasting relationships with one another in a comfortable group setting.

In June 2019, NorthShore University HealthSystem agreed to purchase Swedish Covenant. Following the acquisition, the hospital was renamed Swedish Hospital in 2020.

On April 25, 2026, right before 11:00am, a prisoner seeking treatment for an undisclosed condition shot two officers on the scene with a firearm that he had hidden, then escaped the hospital in minimal clothing. One of the police officers died, while the other was rushed to another hospital in critical condition. The suspect was caught nearby a short time later.

== Centers, departments and institutions ==
=== Chicago Brain & Spine Institute ===
In 2010, the hospital opened the Chicago Brain & Spine Institute, a comprehensive program emphasizing back and spine health and individualized treatment, with surgical intervention as a last alternative. The program incorporates complementary medicine and therapy programs as well as conventional treatment of physical therapy and pain management. It also incorporates the wellness programs at Galter Life Center (see below).

The surgeons at the Chicago Brain & Spine Institute utilize minimally invasive spinal surgery when the situation warrants it. While the patient lies on their side, very narrow tools and a camera are inserted through a tiny opening about the size of a pen to fix the disc that is causing the discomfort, without disturbing important back muscles. The procedure is known to offer a rapid recovery and a faster return to normal activities.

In June 2016, the Chicago Brain & Spine Institute, which was formerly known as the Chicago Back Institute, was renamed after the additional integration of neurologists and a new neurosurgeon specializing in brain surgery.

=== Orthopedic Services ===
Swedish Hospital provides sports medicine, minimally invasive treatment, and surgery and rehabilitation on their main campus. Minimally invasive procedures include direct anterior hip replacement, ultrasound-guided injections and percutaneous tenotomy.

=== Cancer Care ===
Swedish Hospital has earned designation as a Community Hospital Comprehensive Cancer Program with Commendation, awarded to cancer programs that meet and exceed established standards for high-quality cancer care by the American College of Surgeons' Commission on Cancer.

Cancer treatments available at Swedish Hospital include tumor boards, chemotherapy, hormonal therapy, immunotherapy, radiation therapy, and minimally invasive and robotic surgery.

==== Radiation therapy ====
Swedish Hospital offers radiation therapy treatment, using an advanced linear accelerator, for all types of cancers. This technology allows it to use a number of advanced techniques, including electron beam therapy for supplemental tumors and image-guided and intensity-modulated treatments for difficult-to-treat tumors. The intensity modulated radiation therapy (IMRT) adds precision to treat highly sensitive area such as tumors of the brain, head, neck and pelvis.

=== Childbirth ===
Swedish Hospital has been named a Blue Distinction Center for Maternity Care by the Blue Cross Blue Shield Association. The hospital and medical group employs both OB/GYNs and certified nurse midwives for women's health services, including childbirth. They offer natural childbirth options in their family birthing center, including being the only hospital in Chicago offering nitrous oxide as an additional pain management tool for women in childbirth.

=== Emergency services ===
Swedish Hospital's Emergency Services is a 24-hour department with a board-certified team of emergency medical specialists. Children with special urgent care needs can be seen by one of the pediatric emergency specialists affiliated with Children's Memorial Hospital on the medical staff at Swedish Hospital.

The Yelda Family Emergency Services at Swedish Covenant Hospital was unveiled in 2007 in response to the closure of two neighboring hospitals – Edgewater and Ravenswood – and the patient volume that nearly doubled from 2000. In March 2006, Swedish Covenant Hospital broke ground on an expansion and renovation of the original Emergency Department.

Special features include decontamination rooms to treat patients exposed to chemical agents, negative pressure rooms and spaces that incorporate independent air handling systems to help contain airborne pathogens such as SARS.

Swedish Hospital's latest renovation also adds addition acute care patient rooms, including a S.A.N.E. room (for sexual assault patients/exams) and four behavioral health patient rooms.

=== Cardiology and heart services ===
The Cardiology and Heart Services Department of Swedish Hospital is composed of the Cardiac Care Unit, the Cardiac Catheterization Lab and the Chest Pain Center.

In November 2009, Swedish Covenant Hospital received full accreditation as a Chest Pain Center by the Society of Chest Pain Centers.

The Cardiac Care Unit at Swedish Covenant Hospital opened as part of an expansion of the Galter Medical Pavilion in 2003. The unit was developed by cardiologists, cardiac nurses and staff in order to centralize, streamline and enhance the quality of care for cardiac patients.

==== Electrophysiology ====
Swedish Hospital offers electrophysiology diagnosis and treatments to correct arrhythmia and other conditions caused by the heart's electrical system, including cryoablation and fluoroless ablation. It is the only hospital in Chicago that performs ablations without any x-ray whatsoever.

==== Cardiac catheterization ====
The procedures and programs in the Cardiac Catheterization Laboratory include: Cardiac catheterization, angioplasty and stents, cardiac ablation, pacemaker and ICD implants, pacemaker and defibrillator clinic and electrophysiology program.

As part of the update, high-performance equipment including advanced GE imaging devices were installed to enable cardiac specialists to view images on monitors within the lab to assist them during procedures.

== Nursing ==
In 1898, Swedish Covenant Hospital established a hospital-based School of Nursing. In 1968, the program was transitioned to a sister affiliate, North Park University. Many Swedish Covenant Hospital nurses are from North Park University, Loyola University and University of Illinois. At Swedish Covenant Hospital, more than 100 nurses are board certified in Cardiology, Case management, Critical Care, Diabetes, Emergency, Gerontology, Home Care, Infection control, Medical/Surgical, Obstetrics, Oncology, Pain Management, Pediatrics, Psychiatry, Physical rehabilitation, Surgery and Wound Care.

=== Magnet excellence ===
On May 19, 2010, the American Nurses Credentialing Center granted Swedish Covenant Hospital designation as a Magnet hospital for excellence in nursing. Swedish Hospital is one of 28 hospitals in Illinois to achieve this status.

Swedish Covenant Hospital began its Journey to Magnet Excellence in 2006. It is a program developed and sponsored by the American Nurses Credentialing Center to recognize excellence in the delivery of nursing services and providing a method of disseminating successful nursing practices. The Magnet Recognition Program acknowledges quality patient care, nursing excellence, and innovations in professional nursing practice.

=== NICHE designation ===
In 2004, the Nurses Improving Care for Healthsystem Elders (NICHE) program named Swedish Covenant Hospital a NICHE designated hospital. The hospital was awarded a "Senior-Friendly" status when they renewed their designation in 2015.

NICHE is a nurse-driven program producing standards and resources to assist hospitals in improving the quality of care provided for patients age 65 and older. To receive recertification as a NICHE hospital, Swedish Covenant Hospital completed the Annual Membership Profile and the Annual Program Evaluation, designed to determine a hospital's committed to improving quality, enhancing patient and family experience and supporting efforts to serve the community.

== Technological innovations ==
=== da Vinci Surgical System ===
In 2009, Swedish Covenant Hospital acquired the third generation da Vinci Surgical System. The da Vinci Surgical System's EndoWrist instruments are designed to mimic the movements of the surgeon's hands and wrists, giving natural hand-eye coordination and excellent flexibility and control when operating. Nine physicians at Swedish Covenant Hospital are trained to use the da Vinci Si.

=== Hyperbaric oxygen therapy ===
In 2002, Swedish Covenant Hospital completed its hyperbaric oxygen chambers to help wounds heal seven days faster than the national average. The 100 percent pure oxygen encourages better circulation and faster healing so that diabetic patients, for example, have a 96 percent healing rate, with an average healing time of 31.5 days at Swedish Covenant Hospital.

== Partner organizations on campus ==
=== Erie ===
The Erie Foster Avenue Health Center on Swedish Hospital's campus provides expanded health services and high-quality low-cost medical care. Erie currently operates 13 other locations throughout the city and surrounding hospital.

=== Child Care Center ===
The James and Suzanne McCormick Montessori Child Care Center at Swedish Hospital serves both hospital employees with small children and members of the community. The Montessori discipline focuses on teaching independence, responsibility and self-discipline, as well as encouraging cognitive development at the child's own pace and stressing the uniqueness of each child. The Child Care Center is the only Montessori hospital-based program in the United States. The Child Care Center at Swedish Hospital offers Montessori infant, toddler and preschool daycare for children ages 6 weeks to 6 years old.

=== Galter LifeCenter ===
Galter LifeCenter, affiliated with Swedish Hospital, is a 69,000-square-foot (6,400 m^{2}) medical fitness center on the hospital campus. Galter LifeCenter offers programs and services for the mind and body, including yoga and Pilates, as well as sports performance training. It is the only fitness center in Chicago to offer seven Body Training Systems programs, which are licensed programs that require the instructors teaching these programs to have additional certifications. Swedish Hospital's Cardiac Rehabilitation, physical therapy and pain management programs are located at the LifeCenter. The integration of wellness-based and medical services makes Galter LifeCenter a medical-based fitness center.

== Accreditations ==
- American College of Radiology
- American College of Surgeons Commission on Cancer (with commendation)
- American Diabetes Association
- American Osteopathic Association
- Healthcare Facilities Accreditation Program
- Society of Chest Pain Centers

== Affiliations ==
- Children's Memorial Hospital
- Evangelical Covenant Church (formerly affiliated)
- Galter LifeCenter
- Midwestern University
- North Park University (formerly affiliated)
- St George's, University of London
- Rush University Medical Center
- Columbus Central University School of Medicine
- University of Nicosia Medical School

== Statistics ==
Basic Information

- 323 licensed beds
- 2,200 full-time staff
- 580 physicians
- 250 volunteers
- 16,162 admissions
- 2,915 obstetrical services
- 46,145 emergency treatments
- 14,012 surgical procedures
- 260,730 outpatient visits

== Notable people ==
- Harrison Ford was born at Swedish Covenant Hospital in July, 1942.
- Todd Stashwick was born at Swedish Covenant Hospital on October 16, 1968.
- Ernie Banks was one of the first Cardiac Rehabilitation patients at GLC.
