= Elder abuse =

Abuse of old people

Elder abuse is the mistreatment, neglect, exploitation, or manipulation of old people. This definition has been adopted by the World Health Organization (WHO) from a definition put forward by Hourglass (formerly Action on Elder Abuse) in the UK. Laws protecting the elderly from abuse are similar to and related to laws protecting dependent adults from abuse.

Elder abuse includes harms by people an older person knows or has a relationship with, such as a spouse, partner, or family member, a friend or neighbor, or people an older person relies on for services. Many forms of elder abuse are recognized as types of domestic violence or family violence since they are committed by family members. Paid caregivers have also been known to prey on elderly patients.

While a variety of circumstances are considered elder abuse, it does not include general criminal activities against older persons, such as home break-ins, robbery or muggings in the street, or "distraction burglary," where a stranger distracts an older person at the doorstep while another person enters the property to steal.

Over the years, government agencies and community professional groups worldwide have specified elder abuse as a social problem. In 2002, WHO brought international attention to the issue of elder abuse. In 2006, the International Network for Prevention of Elder Abuse (INPEA) designated June 15 as World Elder Abuse Awareness Day (WEAAD). An increasing number of events are held across the globe on this day to raise awareness of elder abuse and highlight ways to challenge it.

== Types ==
In essence, elder abuse involves the use of power and control to harm the well-being and status of an older person. Although there are common themes of elder abuse across nations, elder abuse differs within nations according to the history, culture, and economic strength of older people, as well as the way older people are perceived.

Several types of elder abuse are generally recognized, including:

- Physical abuse: e.g. hitting, punching, slapping, burning, pushing, kicking, restraining, falsely imprisoning or confining, or giving excessive or improper medication, or withholding treatment or medication.
- Psychological, emotional abuse: e.g. humiliating a person. A perpetrator may identify something that matters to an older person and then use that knowledge to coerce them into a particular action. The abuse may take verbal forms such as yelling, blaming, accusing, name-calling, ridiculing, or constantly criticizing, or may take nonverbal forms such as ignoring, shunning, treating with silence, or withdrawing affection.
- Financial abuse: also known as financial exploitation or economic abuse, involving misappropriation of financial resources by family members, caregivers, or strangers, or the use of financial means to control the person or facilitate other types of abuse. Also, failure to pay financial support to impoverished elders in jurisdictions which have filial responsibility laws, such as France, Germany, and most of the United States.
- Sexual abuse: e.g. forcing a person to take part in any sexual activity without consent, including forcing them to participate in conversations of a sexual nature against their will; which may also include situations where the person is no longer able to give consent (dementia).
- Neglect: e.g. depriving a person of proper medical treatment, food, heat, clothing, comfort, or essential medication, or depriving a person of needed services, to force certain kinds of actions, financial and otherwise. Neglect can include leaving an elder person at risk (for example, from a fall) unattended. The deprivation may be intentional (active neglect) or occur due to a lack of knowledge or resources (passive neglect).

In addition, some U.S. state laws also recognize the following as elder abuse:

- Abandonment: deserting a dependent person with the intent to abandon them or leave them unattended long enough to endanger their health or welfare.
- Rights abuse: denying the civil and constitutional rights of a person who is old but not declared by a court to be mentally incompetent. This is an aspect of elder abuse increasingly being recognized by nations.
- Self-neglect: neglecting oneself by not caring about one's own health, well-being or safety. Self-neglect (harm by self) is treated as conceptually different than abuse (harm by others). Elder self-neglect can lead to illness, injury, or even death. Common needs that older adults may deny themselves or ignore include the following: sustenance (food or water); cleanliness (bathing and personal hygiene); adequate clothing for climate protection; proper shelter; adequate safety; clean and healthy surroundings; medical attention for serious illness; and essential medications. Self-neglect is often created by an individual's declining mental awareness or capability. Some older adults may choose to forgo certain health or safety benefits, which may not constitute self-neglect. This may simply be their personal choice. Caregivers and other responsible individuals must honor these choices if the older adult is of sound mind. In other instances, the older adult may lack the necessary resources due to poverty or other social conditions. This is also not considered "self-neglect."
- Institutional abuse refers to physical or psychological harm, as well as rights violations in settings where care and assistance is provided to dependent older adults or others, such as nursing homes. Recent studies of approximately 2,000 nursing home facility residents in the United States reported a growing abuse rate of 44% and neglect up to 95%, making elder abuse in nursing homes a growing danger. Exact statistics are rare due to elder abuse in general and specifically in nursing homes being a silent condition.

== Warning signs ==
The key to prevention and intervention of elder abuse is the ability to recognize the warning signs of its occurrence. Signs of elder abuse differ depending on the type of abuse the victim is suffering. Each type of abuse has distinct signs associated with it.

- Physical abuse can be detected by visible signs on the body including bruises, scratches, scars, sprains, or broken bones. More subtle indications of physical abuse include signs of restraint such as rope marks on the wrist or broken eyeglasses.
- Emotional abuse often accompanies other types of abuse and can usually be detected by changes in an elder person's personality or behavior. The elder may also exhibit behavior mimicking dementia, such as rocking or mumbling. Emotional abuse is the most underreported form of elder abuse. Elder abuse occurs when a person fails to treat an elder with respect, and it may include verbal abuse. The elder experiences social isolation or lack of acknowledgement. One indicator of emotional abuse is the elder adult's being unresponsive or uncommunicative. They can also be unreasonably suspicious or fearful, more isolated, and not wanting to be as social as they may have been before. Emotional abuse is underreported but can have the most damaging effects because it leads to more physical and mental health problems.
- Financial exploitation is a more subtle form of abuse and may be more challenging to notice. Signs of financial exploitation include unpaid bills, purchases of unnecessary goods or services, significant withdrawals from accounts, and belongings or money missing from the home.
- Sexual abuse, like physical abuse, can be detected by visible signs on the body, especially around the breasts or genital area. Other signs include inexplicable infections, bleeding, and torn underclothing.
- Neglect can be inflicted by either a caregiver or oneself. Signs of neglect include malnutrition and dehydration, poor hygiene, noncompliance with a medical prescription, and unsafe living conditions.

In addition to observing signs in the elderly individual, one can also detect abuse by monitoring changes in the caregiver's behavior. For example, the caregiver may not allow them to speak to or receive visitors or may exhibit indifference or a lack of affection towards the elder or refer to the elder as "a burden." Caregivers who have a history of substance abuse or mental illness are more likely to commit elder abuse than other individuals.

Abuse can sometimes be subtle and therefore difficult to detect. Regardless, awareness organizations and research advise that one take any suspicion seriously and address concerns adequately and immediately.

=== Signs ===
- Lack of medical aids such as glasses, walker, hearing aids.
- Signs of emotional trauma.
- Broken eyeglasses/frames, or physical signs of punishment or being restrained.
- Signs of insufficient care or unpaid bills despite adequate financial resources.
- Broken bones (fractures)
- Poor physical appearance
- Changes in mental status
- Frequent infections
- Bruising, scratches, welts, or cuts.
- Unexplained weight loss
- Refusal to speak
- Signs of dehydration
- Lack of cleanliness

== Health consequences ==
The health consequences of elder abuse are serious. Elder abuse can destroy an elderly person's quality of life in the forms of:

- Declining functional abilities
- Increased dependency, sense of helplessness, and stress.
- Worsening psychological decline
- Premature mortality and morbidity
- Depression and dementia
- Malnutrition
- Bedsores
- Death

The risk of death for elder abuse victims is three times higher than for non-victims.

== Perpetrators ==
An abuser can be a caregiver, spouse, partner, relative, friend, neighbor, volunteer worker, paid worker, practitioner, solicitor, or any other individual with the intent to deprive a vulnerable person of their resources. Relatives include adult children and their spouses or partners, their offspring, and other extended family members. Children and living relatives who have a history of substance abuse or have had other life troubles are of particular concern. For example, Hybrid Financial Exploitation (HFE) abusive individuals are more likely to be a relative, chronically unemployed, and dependent on the elderly person. Additionally, past studies have estimated that between 16 percent and 38 percent of all elder abusers have a history of mental illness. Elder abuse perpetrated by individuals with mental illnesses can be decreased by lessening the level of dependency that persons with serious mental illness have on family members. This can be done by funneling more resources into housing assistance programs, intensive care management services, and better welfare benefits for individuals with serious mental illness. People with substance abuse and mental health disorders typically have very small social networks, and this confinement contributes to the overall occurrence of elder abuse.

Perpetrators of elder abuse can include anyone in a position of trust, control or authority over the individual. Family relationships, neighbors and friends, are all socially considered relationships of trust, whether or not the older adult actually thinks of the people as "trustworthy." Some perpetrators may "groom" an older person (befriend or build a relationship with them) in order to establish a relationship of trust. Older people living alone who have no adult children living nearby are particularly vulnerable to "grooming" by neighbors and friends who would hope to gain control of their estates.

The majority of abusers are relatives, typically the older adult's spouse/partner or sons and daughters, although the type of abuse differs according to the relationship. In some situations the abuse is "domestic violence grown old," a situation in which the abusive behavior of a spouse or partner continues into old age. In some situations, an older couple may be attempting to care and support each other and failing, in the absence of external support. In the case of sons and daughters, it tends to be that of financial abuse, justified by a belief that it is nothing more than the "advance inheritance" of property, valuables, and money.

Though corporate abusers, such as brokerage firms and bank trust companies have been considered too regulated to be able to abuse the elderly, cases of such abuse have been reported. Such corporate abuse might escape notice both because they have more aptitude at methods of abuse that can go undetected and because they are protected by attorneys and the government in ways that individuals are not.

Within paid care environments, abuse can occur for a variety of reasons. Some abuse is the willful act of cruelty inflicted by a single individual upon an older person. In fact, a case study in Canada suggests that the high elder abuse statistics are from repeat offenders who, like in other forms of abuse, practice elder abuse for the schadenfreude associated with the act. More commonly, institutional abuses or neglect may reflect lack of knowledge, lack of training, lack of support, or insufficient resourcing. Institutional abuse may be the consequence of common practices or processes that are part of running of a care institution or service. Sometimes this type of abuse is referred to as "poor practice," although this term reflects the motive of the perpetrator (the causation) rather than the impact upon the older person.

Elder abuse is not a direct parallel to child maltreatment, as perpetrators of elder abuse do not have the same legal protection of rights as parents of children do. For example, a court order is needed to remove a child from their home but not to remove a victim of elder abuse from theirs.

== Risk factors ==
Various risk factors increase the likelihood that an elderly person will become a victim of elder abuse, including an elderly person who:

- Has memory problems (such as dementia).
- Has a mental illness, either long-standing or recent.
- Has physical disabilities.
- Has depression, loneliness, or lack of social support.
- Abuses alcohol or other substances.
- Takes prescribed medications that impair judgment.
- Is verbally or physically combative with the caregiver.
- Has a shared living situation.
- Has a criminal history.

Several other risk factors increase the likelihood that a caregiver will participate in elder abuse, including a caregiver who:

- Feels overwhelmed or resentful.
- Has a history of substance abuse or a history of abusing others.
- Is dependent on the older person for housing, finances, or other needs.
- Has mental health problems.
- Is unemployed.
- Has a criminal history.
- Has a shared living situation.

In addition:

- Lower income or poverty has been found to be associated with elder abuse. Low economic resources have been conceptualized as a contextual or situational stress or contributing to elder abuse.
- Living with a large number of household members other than a spouse is associated with an increased risk of abuse, especially financial abuse.

Risk factors can also be categorized into individual, relationship, community, and sociocultural levels. At the individual level, elders who have poor physical and mental health are at higher risk. At the relationship level, a shared living situation is a huge risk factor for the elderly, and living in the same area as the abuser is more likely to result in abuse. At the community level, caregivers may knowingly or inadvertently cause social isolation of the elderly. At the sociocultural level, being represented as weak and dependent, having a lack of funds to pay for care, needing assistance but living alone, and having bonds between generations of a family destroyed are possible factors in elder abuse.

== Increase of Elder Abuse in the United States ==
The number of incidents of elder abuse is increasing exponentially due to the rapidly growing population of older people. It is predicted that in the next thirty years, the number of Americans over the age of 65 is going to quadruple. Not only that, by the year 2054, senior citizens will make up roughly a quarter of the total population, numbering to around 84 million. With these statistics, we can only assume that with less young people proportionally to take care for these elderly, there will be more stress on the care providers. Some factors that increase the risk for elder abuse is having health problems and low social support, which are both common problems among senior citizens and likely to be more so with a larger population to take care of. For this reason, as the proportions of young people to older people decreases we likely will see more and more strain on the system of protection and care for elders' well-being, and increased rates of violence, neglect, and mistreatment.

Financial stress is another factor leading to an increased rate of abuse and exploitation amongst the elderly. With an ever-climbing cost of living and an uncertain future for those receiving social security, financial difficulties are undoubtedly going to continue to be a serious problem for these older generations. Social Security is a vital form of financial support for retirees, accounting for "half of the household income for adults aged 62 and older, according to the U.S. Census. But it is under threat, with the Social Security Administration making a statement that funds are expected to "be exhausted" by 2037 if drastic action isn't taken soon. This is all quite dire for a population of vulnerable adults who may have physical and mental limitations that prevent them from working and receiving income. More than that, retirement was once seen as a human right for working adults over the age of 60. The National Council of Aging also states that the cost of living adjustment for Social Security benefits "is nowhere near enough to allow older adults to afford their true cost of living." and that the poverty rate amongst seniors was as high as 14% in 2023. This is all quite alarming considering that the monthly median cost of nursing home care was $8,669 for a shared room and $9,733 for a private room according to the NCOA (Person, 2025.) In 2022 only 15% of single adults aged 75 or older could even afford the costs of housing and long-term care, even though 70% of adults ages 65 and older will require long-term care services at some point. With poverty being a risk factor for elder abuse, it is almost certain that these economic strains will only lead to more likelihood of elder abuse. Without the government's help, many elderly people will have to depend on family members for support, putting an even greater strain on family relations and their finances. In a survey of caregivers done in California, 44.4% of California's estimated 6.7 million adult caregivers reported experiencing some level of financial stress in 2020, with 1 in 5 reporting "extreme financial stress." Given as we know that the majority of abuse cases in the aged are caused by family members, these statistics are not too comforting caregivers. Therefore, we can see that the future economic situation is going to be a catalyst for further abuse of the elderly and unsafe living conditions.

A decreased access to care for senior citizens is also a reason for an increased rate of abuse. Many care facilities are also struggling to stay open. The Centers for Medicare and Medicaid Services says that 81% of them would need to hire additional workers to meet nursing staff requirements. If they don't, they will likely have to close. According to the American Health Care Association, 46 percent of nursing homes are limiting their new admissions, and 57 percent of nursing homes have a waiting list. This means that those who need assisted living right away might be left waiting even though they have nowhere else to go. Since 2020, there has been a drastic decrease in nursing home beds as well as a closure of units or floors or wings of nursing homes in 20% of facilities due to labor shortages. These closures alone in recent years have displaced 28,421 residents. As we know, with an increase in elderly population there is more need for placement than ever. Unfortunately, it is also true that with underpaid or overworked staff, abuse will increase, as it is reported that 13% of cases are from medical caregivers. We can assume with less nursing care facilities much of the care will be handed to family members, who may be inadequately trained to care for aging family members and their medical needs. For this reason, neglect, negligence, and elder cruelty will likely increase as we face a shortage of care facilities in the years to come.

== Research and statistics ==
There has been a general lack of reliable data in this area and it is often argued that the absence of data is a reflection of the low priority given to work associated with older people. However, over the past decade there has been a growing amount of research into the nature and extent of elder abuse. The research still varies considerably in the definitions being used, who is being asked, and what is being asked. As a result, the statistics used in this area vary considerably.

One study suggests that around 25% of vulnerable older adults will report abuse in the previous month, totaling up to 6% of the general elderly population. However, some consistent themes are beginning to emerge from interactions with abused elders, and through limited and small scale research projects. Work undertaken in Canada suggests that approximately 70% of elder abuse is perpetrated against women and this is supported by evidence from the Hourglass helpline in the UK, which identifies women as victims in 67% of calls. Also domestic violence in later life may be a continuation of long-term partner abuse and in some cases, abuse may begin with retirement or the onset of a health condition. Certainly, abuse increases with age, with 78 percent of victims being over 70 years of age.

The higher proportion of spousal homicides supports the suggestion that abuse of older women is often a continuation of long term spousal abuse against women. In contrast, the risk of homicide for older men was far greater outside the family than within. This is an important point because the domestic violence of older people is often not recognized and consequently strategies, which have proved effective within the domestic violence arena, have not been routinely transferred into circumstances involving the family abuse of older people.

According to the Hourglass helpline in the UK, abuse occurs primarily in the family home (64%), followed by residential care (23%), and then hospitals (5%), although a helpline does not necessarily provide a true reflection of such situations as it is based upon the physical and mental ability of people to utilize such a resource.

Research conducted in New Zealand broadly supports the above findings, with some variations. Of 1288 cases in 2002–2004, 1201 individuals, 42 couples, and 45 groups were found to have been abused. Of these, 70 percent were female. Psychological abuse (59%), followed by material/financial (42%), and physical abuse (12%) were the most frequently identified types of abuse. Sexual abuse occurred in 2% of reported cases. Age Concern New Zealand found that most abusers are family members (70%), most commonly sons or daughters (40%). Older abusers (those over 65 years) are more likely to be husbands.

In 2007, 4766 cases of suspected abuse, neglect, or financial exploitation involving older adults were reported, an increase of 9 percent over 2006. 19 incidents were related to a death, and a total of 303 incidents were considered life-threatening. About one in 11 incidents involved a life-threatening or fatal situation.

In 2012, the study called Pure Financial Exploitation vs. Hybrid Exploitation Co-Occurring With Physical Abuse and/or Neglect of Elderly Persons by Shelly L. Jackson and Thomas L. Hafemeister brought attention to the hybrid abuse that elderly persons can experience. This study revealed that victims of hybrid financial exploitation or HFE lost an average of $185,574, a range of $20–$750,000.

=== Barriers to obtaining statistics ===
Several conditions make it hard for researchers to obtain accurate statistics on elder abuse. Researchers may have difficulty obtaining accurate elder abuse statistics for the following reasons:

- Elder abuse is largely a hidden problem and tends to be committed in the privacy of the elderly person's home, mostly by his or her family members.
- Elder abuse victims are often unwilling to report their abuse for fear of others' disbelief, fear of loss of independence, fear of being institutionalized, fear of losing their only social support (especially if the perpetrator is a relative), and fear of being subject to future retaliation by the perpetrator(s).
- Elder abuse victims' cognitive decline and ill health may prevent them from reporting their abuse.
- Lack of proper training of service providers, such as social workers, law enforcement, nurses, etc., about elder abuse, therefore the number of cases reported tends to be low.
- The subjective nature of elder abuse, which largely depends on one's interpretation.
- Another reason why there is a lack of accurate statistics is the debate of whether to include self-neglect or not. Many are unsure if it should be included since it does not involve another person as an abuser. Those opposed to the inclusion of self-neglect make the claim that it is a different form of abuse and thus, should not be included in the statistics. Due to this discrepancy and the others mentioned above, it is difficult to get accurate data concerning the abuse of the elderly.

== Prevention ==
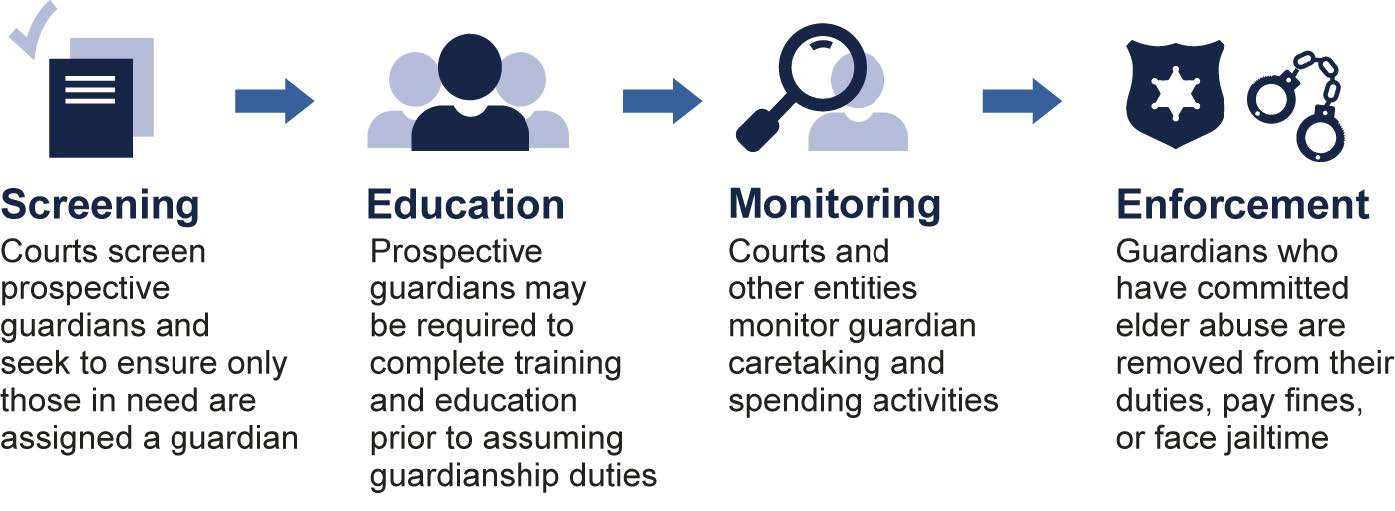
Graphic depicting protective measures taken to prevent elder abuse. (Source: US Government Accountability Office)

Doctors, nurses, and other medical personnel can play a vital role in assisting elder abuse victims. Studies have shown that elderly individuals, on average, make 13.9 visits per year to a physician. Although there has been an increase in awareness of elder abuse over the years, physicians tend to only report 2% of elder abuse cases. Reasons for lack of reporting by physicians include a lack of current knowledge concerning state laws on elder abuse, concern about angering the abuser and ruining the relationship with the elderly patient, possible court appearances, lack of cooperation from elderly patients or families, and lack of time and reimbursement. Through education and training about elder abuse, health care professionals can better assist elder abuse victims.

Educating and training those in the criminal justice system, such as police, prosecutors, and the judiciary, on elder abuse, as well as increased legislation to protect elders, will also help to minimize elder abuse. Increased legislations to protect elders and will also provide improved assistance to victims of elder abuse.

In addition, community involvement in responding to elder abuse can contribute to elderly persons' safety. In general, preventing the occurrence or recurrence of elder abuse helps not only the elder but it may also improve the anxiety and depression of their caregivers too. Communities can develop programs that are structured around meeting the needs of elderly persons. For example, several communities throughout the United States have created Financial Abuse Specialist Teams, which are multidisciplinary groups that consist of public and private professionals who volunteer their time to advise Adult Protective Services (APS), law enforcement, and private attorneys on matters of vulnerable adult financial abuse.

== False accusations ==
It is important to recognize that false accusations of elder abuse are very common. An elderly person who has dementia or a mental illness may falsely claim to be a victim of abuse. By one estimate, 70% of elderly people with mental impairments such as dementia, delusions, or paranoia falsely accuse caregivers of stealing. Mentally impaired elders may claim that a caregiver is feeding them poisoned food or holding them prisoner. Websites such as Alzlive.com and DailyCaring.com offer advice for caregivers who are falsely accused of elder abuse or other crimes.

== Examples ==
- Stephen Akinmurele
- Juana Barraza
- Kenneth Erskine
- Dana Sue Gray
- Delroy Grant
- Reta Mays
- Thierry Paulin
- Kaspars Petrovs
- Dorothea Puente
- Mickey Rooney
- Irina Gaidamachuk
- John Wayne Glover
- Charles Rogers (murder suspect)
- Murder of Esther Brown
- Murder of Mee Kuen Chong
- Murder of Una Crown
- Murder of Louisa Dunne
- Murder of Valerie Graves
- Murders of Peter Neumair and Laura Perselli
- Murder of Patricia O'Connor
- Murder of Janie Perrin
- Murders of William and Patricia Wycherley
- Stan Lee
- Murders of Claudia Maupin and Oliver Northup

== See also ==
- Abusive power and control
- Adult Protective Services
- Ageism
- Aging in place
- Assisted living
- Battery
- Child abuse
- Cruelty to animals
- Elder financial abuse
- Elder rights
- Elderly care
- Institutional abuse
- Isolation to facilitate abuse
- Parental abuse by children (equivalent abuse but for the next generation)
- Psychological abuse
- Psychological manipulation
- The Weinberg Center for Elder Abuse Prevention
