= St. Mary's High School (Lynn, Massachusetts) =

St. Mary's Lynn
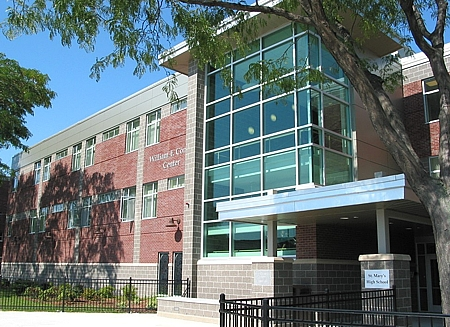
- St. Mary's High School

Location
- 35 Tremont Street; Lynn, (Essex County), Massachusetts 01902; United States; 42°27′46″N 70°57′4″W

Information
- Type: Private, coeducational (formerly Parochial)
- Religious affiliation: Catholic
- Established: 1881
- Head of school: John F. Dolan
- Grades: Pre-K–12
- Colors: Navy blue and gold
- Slogan: Catholic, Excellence, Integrity, Respect
- Athletics conference: Catholic Central League
- Mascot: Spartan
- Team name: Spartans
- Rival: Bishop Fenwick (Peabody, Massachusetts)
- Accreditation: New England Association of Schools and Colleges
- Newspaper: Tremont Tribune
- Tuition: $21,100 (9-12), $15,000 (Marian Division 6-8), $8,850 (Elementary 1-5), $10,100 (Early Education Pre-K-K)
- Website: https://www.stmaryslynn.com

St. Mary's High School is a private Catholic high school in Lynn, Massachusetts, United States. It is located in the Roman Catholic Archdiocese of Boston.

== Background ==
St. Mary's High School was established in 1881 as Saint Mary's Boys High School. A Girl's High School was added later, followed by coeducation. In 1989 the school began a junior high school starting with a 7th grade class only, with an 8th grade class added the following year. The junior high school added a 6th grade class in 2011 after Massachusetts moved to a middle school education model. Beginning in the 2023 school year they added an elementary and early education division to the school. St. Mary's Lynn now serves students from Pre-K - 12.

St. Mary's incorporated in 2006 as a private school, independent from the Archdiocese of Boston, and instituted a new governance structure with a head of school, principal, and twenty-member Board of Trustees, thus ending its period as a parochial school.

== Athletics ==
St. Mary's teams include:

- Baseball (1987, 1988, 2015, 2019, 2021 State Champions)
- Boys Basketball (2000, 2001, 2002, 2012, 2016, 2022 State Champions)
- Girls Basketball (2001, 2002, 2011, 2014, 2022, 2025 State Champions) (2011, 2014 Co-CCL Champions)
- Cheerleading
- Crew
- Football (2005, 2022 State Champions, 2012, 2016, 2018 State Finalists)
- Boys Golf (2005, 2006, 2017, 2018, 2019 State Champions)
- Boys Hockey (2017 State Champions)
- Girls Ice Hockey (2005, 2008, 2009, 2010, and 2013 State Champions)
- Intramural Basketball (Co-ed)
- Boys Lacrosse
- Girls Lacrosse
- Girls Rugby
- Boys Soccer (1988 State Champions, 2018 State Finalists)
- Girls Soccer
- Softball (2008 Co-CCL Champions, 2008 State Champions)
- Swimming (Co-ed) (2008 CCL Champions)
- Boys Tennis
- Girls Tennis
- Track
- Volleyball (2006 and 2007 ( Undefeated CCL Champions)

The St. Mary's Girls Ice Hockey team went a perfect 25–0 in 2007-2008 season. The girls then repeated this feat plus one to go 26–0 in the 2008-2009 season. In addition, they went through the 2009-2010 season undefeated with one tie. The result: 100 consecutive games without a loss over three years before a loss to Hingham in the state semi-finals, and three Massachusetts Division 1 State Titles.

== Miscellaneous ==
The former Girls High School building was demolished in 2005 to make way for the state-of-the-art William F. Connell Center, which provides a library, technology center, chapel, and classrooms.

Students are encouraged to participate in Christian service activities, such as Rachel's Challenge, Sant' Edigio, and assisting at My Brother's Table, a local food pantry.

== Notable alumni ==
- Tony Conigliaro, Major League Baseball player
- William F. Connell, Boston businessman and philanthropist, namesake of Boston College's Connell School of Nursing
- Tony Fossas, Major League Baseball player
- Kevin B. Harrington, President of the Massachusetts State Senate, 1971–1978
- Chris Howard, Major League Baseball player
- Kevin Trudeau, author, infomercial salesman, fraudster
