= Boston College Connell School of Nursing =

Nursing school at Boston College

Coordinates: 42.33632°N 71.16853°W

Connell School of Nursing
- Private nursing school
- Boston College
- Location: Chestnut Hill, Massachusetts, U.S.
- Full name: William F. Connell School of Nursing
- Abbreviation: CSON
- Established: 1947; 79 years ago
- Named for: William F. Connell
- Former names: Boston College School of Nursing
- Colors: Maroon and gold
- Gender: Co-educational
- Dean: Katherine E. Gregory
- Undergraduates: 448
- Postgraduates: 341

The Boston College Connell School of Nursing (CSON) is the professional nursing school at Boston College in Chestnut Hill, Massachusetts.

The Connell School of Nursing awards undergraduate, master's and doctoral degrees, while offering a continuing education program for practitioners in the field. Its Doctor of Philosophy (Ph.D.) program was the first nursing doctoral program to be offered at a Jesuit university. The Connell School was the first full-time undergraduate program to accept women at Boston College.

== History ==
The School of Nursing, as it was then known, was founded in 1947 at the behest of Archbishop Richard Cushing, who saw the need for a bachelor's degree-granting school of nursing under Catholic auspices in the Greater Boston area. Mary Maher, who served on the faculty of the Massachusetts General Hospital School, was appointed dean in November 1946. At that time, Boston College was an all-male college and the nursing program was the first full-time undergraduate program to open to women. Initially, 35 registered nurses enrolled in January 1947 for a Bachelor of Science (B.S.) degree in nursing or nursing education, followed by 27 secondary school graduates in the fall. In 1948, Rita P. Kelleher, who held degrees in nursing from Columbia and Boston University, was named dean following Maher's brief tenure. In 1949, 33 nurses became the school’s first graduates. In June 1954, the school’s first four male students graduated from the two-year Graduate Nurse program.

The nursing school was initially located at the university's professional school building at 126 Newbury Street in downtown Boston. Nursing students had to commute to Chestnut Hill on Tuesdays and Thursdays to take their lab classes in Devlin Hall. The master's program was established in 1958. Two years later, the school's second home, Cushing Hall, was dedicated on March 25, 1960.

U.S. Senator Ted Kennedy speaks at the dedication of the Connell School of Nursing in 2003.

The school reached a milestone when a Ph.D. program began in 1988, making Boston College the first Jesuit university to offer a doctorate in nursing. In 1991, the School of Nursing’s Global Health Initiative began with a service trip to Ecuador. Later clinical service trips included Chile, the Dominican Republic, France, Haiti, Nicaragua, and Switzerland.

In 2003, the School of Nursing was renamed the William F. Connell School of Nursing following a $10 million gift from William F. Connell, a 1959 Boston College alumnus, university benefactor, and businessman. In 2015, after more than five decades in Cushing Hall, the Connell School moved to Maloney Hall, constructed in 2002 on the university's lower campus.

The Connell School launched its Doctor of Nursing Practice (DNP) program in fall 2019.

In July 2021, Katherine E. Gregory became dean, succeeding Susan Gennaro, who had led the school since 2008.

In 2025, the Connell School launched a 24-month, in-person Master of Science program in nurse-midwifery, with its first students scheduled to enroll that May.

=== Traditions ===
Each year, Connell School graduates who enter into the nursing school field receive a nursing pin, which depicts the official Boston College seal and is inscribed with the words "For Religion and the Liberal Arts" in Latin during a pinning ceremony that can be traced back to Florence Nightingale's service during the Crimean War.

The school's Pinnancle Lecture Series brings an invited speaker to Boston College each semester to address an issue at the forefront of health care. Past keynote speakers include alumna Terry Fulmer, dean of New York University College of Nursing; Margaret Grey, a Yale School of Nursing professor; Patricia Flatley Brennan, director of the U.S. National Library of Medicine; and Susan Orsega, chief nurse officer at the U.S. Public Health Service.

The Dean Rita P. Kelleher Award is presented annually during reunion to an accomplished Connell School graduate.

== Notable faculty and alumni ==
Notable faculty and alumni include:

- Callista Roy: nursing theorist and former Connell School professor
- Ann Wolbert Burgess: a Connell School professor and forensic nursing scholar and FBI consultant
- Terry Fulmer: a Connell School graduate and gerontologist
- Karen Daley: a Connell School graduate and former president of the American Nurses Association

== Clinical partners ==
Clinical teaching takes place in more than 85 health care facilities in the metropolitan Boston area. Some of these include:

- Arbour Hospital
- Bedford Veteran's Administration Hospital
- Beth Israel Deaconess Medical Center
- Boston Medical Center
- Boston Public Health Commission
- Boston Public Schools
- Brigham and Women's Hospital
- Cambridge Health Alliance
- Children's Hospital
- Dana Farber Cancer Institute
- Harvard Vanguard Medical Associates
- Lahey Clinic
- Massachusetts General Hospital
- McLean Hospital
- Newton-Wellesley Hospital
- Partners Home Care, Inc.
- Pine Street Inn
- Shriner's Burn Institute
- Steward St. Elizabeth's Medical Center
- Tufts Medical Center
- UMass Memorial Medical Center
- VA Boston Healthcare System

== Awards and recognition ==
In 2018, the Connell School was designated a National League for Nursing Center of Excellence in Nursing Education and received a continuing Center of Excellence designation in 2022.

== See also ==
- List of nursing schools in the United States
