= Jonathan Balls =

English serial killer

- Born: 1769; Happisburgh, Norfolk, England
- Died: 20 April 1846 (aged 76–77); Happisburgh, Norfolk, England
- Cause of death: Suicide by poisoning
- Conviction: N/A
- Penalty: N/A

Details
- Span of crimes: 1824–1845
- Country: England
- State: Norfolk
- Date apprehended: N/A

Jonathan Balls (1769 – 20 April 1846) was an English serial killer who was posthumously accused of poisoning at least 22 people, almost all of them close family members, in the village of Happisburgh from 1824 to 1845. He was never tried for these crimes, as he committed suicide before an official investigation into the alleged crimes was launched.

== Early life ==
Next to nothing is known of Balls' life prior to the crimes, aside from the fact that he was born in 1769, lived in Happisburgh for his entire life and was reputedly a "bad character" who had served prison time for many petty crimes. At some point in his life, he married a woman named Elizabeth with whom he had three daughters, all of whom would marry and have multiple children of their own later on in life. As the family had been poor for most of their life, they were supported by a parochial relief fund, but as Balls grew older, he had to rely on increasing financial support from his children. This supposedly served as motivation to start fatally poisoning other family members one by one, so the proceeds could be directed towards him instead.

== Murders ==
Sometime circa the early 1830s, Balls started buying large quantities of arsenic from nearby towns, claiming that the family home was infested with rats that he desperately wanted to get rid of. The first recorded suspicious death was of one of his daughters, 24-year-old Maria Lacey, who died from what was described as a combination of mistreatment from her husband and some unidentified illness. One year later, on 25 December 1836, 13-month-old Maria Green died mysteriously, followed by 8-year-old Ann Peggs, a granddaughter, who died from a presumed illness on 7 June 1839. Shortly after 13-month-old Martha Green died, her 3-year-old brother, William, also died on 31 October 1841.

For the following few years, multiple other family members died in suspicious circumstances, including one of Balls' children and one of his parents, both of whom died mysteriously after moving from their home in Brumstead to live with him in 1824. Due to the increasing number of deaths in the family, the neighbours asked for an inquest to be held into their deaths on at least two occasions, but no such investigation took place. In September 1845, a grandson named Samuel Green died, followed by Balls' bedridden wife, Elizabeth, only four months later. The final confirmed victim was a granddaughter, Elizabeth Anne Pestle, who died on 17 April 1846.

== Suicide and investigation ==
Just three days after his granddaughter's death, Jonathan Balls died at his home in Happisburgh, after he was suddenly struck with an illness days prior. Seemingly convinced that he was going to die, he instructed one of his daughters that he wanted to be buried with several items: a Bible; two plum cakes put in each of his hands; a fire iron; some coal tongs and handkerchiefs. His funeral took place a few days later, and was attended by a few friends and some of his surviving relatives.

With yet another death laid at the family's doorstep, the local populace begged the local coroner, Mr. Pilgrim, to exhume the bodies and reexamine the cause of death. Eventually, Pilgrim listened and ordered the exhumations of Jonathan Balls and Elizabeth Pestle's bodies, which was attended by the local pastor, several churchwardens, and police officers. The coroners found an unusually large quantity of arsenic in both bodies, and because of this, they started investigating other family members. Authorities also questioned the living relatives and some of the servants who had been employed at the property, with one maid, Sarah Kerrison, claiming that she had seen Balls sprinkling a mysterious white powder into a teacup that he gave to his sickly wife, only for her illness to gradually worsen before her eventual death. When Kerrison herself tasted some of the food prepared in the household, she quickly fell ill and showcased symptoms of poisoning such as vomiting and severe chest pain.

== Aftermath ==
The case became a media sensation and even attracted enough attention for a discussion in the Parliament, with one attendee, a Mr. Wakley, requesting that an inquiry take place. In response, the Home Secretary, Sir James Graham, 2nd Baronet, said that he would do whatever he could to convince the Home Office to look further into the case.

== Partial list of victims ==
Number	Name	Age	Connection to Balls	Date of death
1	Maria Lacey	24 years	Daughter	July 1835
2	Maria Green	13 months	Granddaughter	25 December 1836
3	Ann Peggs	8 years	Granddaughter	7 June 1839
4	Martha Green	13 months	Granddaughter	31 October 1841
5	William Green	3 years	Grandson	31 October 1841
6	Ann Elizabeth Pestle	2 years	Granddaughter	1843
7	Samuel Pestle	3 years	Grandson	September 1845
8	Elizabeth Anne Balls	82 years	Wife	December 1845
9	Elizabeth Anne Pestle	unknown	Granddaughter	17 April 1846

== See also ==
- List of serial killers in the United Kingdom

== Bibliography ==
- Pamela Brooks (1 April 2007). Norfolk Poisoners. Halsgrove. ISBN 978-1841145839.
