= Kenneth Erskine =

British serial killer

- Born: 1 July 1963 (age 63); Hammersmith, London, England
- Other name: The Stockwell Strangler
- Convictions: Murder; reduced to manslaughter (7 counts)
- Penalty: Detention at Broadmoor Hospital but moved to Thornford Park Hospital

Details
- Victims: 7–11
- Span of crimes: 9 April – 23 July 1986
- Date apprehended: 28 July 1986

Kenneth Erskine (born 1 July 1963) is a British serial killer who became known as the Stockwell Strangler. He committed the murders of 7–11 senior citizens in London between April and July 1986.

== Early life ==
Erskine was born in Hammersmith on 1 July 1963 to a British mother and Antiguan father. Erskine has three brothers. He was abandoned by both parents during childhood and attended various special schools. His parents divorced when he was 12. On a field trip, he tried to drown his peers, and he became increasingly violent as he grew older. He eventually became homeless.

== Crimes ==
Erskine's criminal career began with a number of burglaries. He was able to open ten separate bank accounts with the proceeds of his crimes. Erskine served a prison sentence in HM Prison Feltham.

During 1986, Erskine murdered at least seven elderly people, breaking into their homes and strangling them; most often they were sexually assaulted. The crimes took place in London.

His first victim was Nancy Emms, 78, of Wandsworth, who died on 9 April 1986. Her death was initially believed to have been due to natural causes and declared as such by her doctor on her death certificate. It was only established that she had been murdered when her home help noticed that her television set was missing from her flat. A post mortem examination revealed that she had been raped and strangled.

His second victim was Janet Cockett, 67, who died on 9 June 1986 after being strangled in her flat on the Wandsworth housing estate on which she was chairwoman of the tenants' association. Her death was initially thought to have been from natural causes. She had not been sexually assaulted. A post-mortem showed that she had been murdered. Erskine's palm print was found on a window at Cockett's flat. He later broke into the residence of an elderly man, but Erskine abandoned this burglary when a noise disturbed him enough to make him flee.

On 28 June 1986, Erskine killed his third and fourth victims at a residential home in Stockwell, one of them a World War II veteran: Valentine Gleim, 84, and Zbigniew Strabawa, 94. Both men were sexually assaulted and strangled. Erskine's fifth victim was William Carman, 84, of Islington. He stole money from Carman's flat before molesting him and strangling him in an attack on 8 July 1986. He claimed his sixth victim on 21 July 1986, when he similarly attacked 74-year-old William Downes in a Stockwell bedsit.

The final victim was Florence Tisdall, an 83-year-old widow who lived on her own at Ranelagh Gardens Mansions in Fulham. She was strangled and raped. She was found dead by the caretaker on the morning of 23 July 1986. Erskine was arrested on 28 July 1986 at a social security office. Police were then able to match his palm print to one left at one of the murder scenes, and he was identified in a police lineup by 74-year-old Fred Prentice, who claimed Erskine tried to strangle him in his bed a month before police apprehended him.

== Investigation and trial ==
A homeless drifter and solvent abuser, Erskine was in his early twenties when he committed the crimes. Erskine's burglary convictions before and during this killing spree meant that his fingerprints and photographs were on police records. Police had identified Erskine as the perpetrator during his killing spree. He was convicted of seven murders. During his trial, he was seen to be masturbating.

Police suspected Erskine of four other murders. These include the murder of Wilfred Parkes (aged 81, at Stockwell, on 2 June 1986) and Trevor Thomas (aged 75, at Lambeth, on 21 July 1986), but did not find sufficient evidence to charge Erskine with these crimes.

It was clear to the police that all these attacks were the work of one man. There were no signs of forced entry, with every indication that the intruder had gained access through an unsecured window. In each case, it appeared that the killer had knelt on the victims' chests, and then placed his left hand over their mouths whilst he used his right hand to grip their throats and strangle them to death. In addition, four of the victims had been sodomised, although there was some uncertainty as to whether this had taken place before or after death.

Erskine was found guilty of seven murders in January 1988 and sentenced to life imprisonment with a recommended minimum term of 40 years but has since been found to have a mental disorder within the meaning of the Mental Health Act 1983. In 1988 he was transferred from prison under sections 47/49 of the Mental Health Act 1983 to the maximum security Broadmoor Hospital and has been held there since then. The trial judge's recommendation is one of the most severe ever handed out in British legal history.

A report by Horne dated 17 March 2006 refers to an assessment of Erskine in September 2004. Horne concludes that, at the time of the assessment, Erskine had chronic schizophrenia and antisocial personality disorder and that this had probably been the case since March 1980. In July 2009, following an appeal, Erskine's murder convictions were reduced to manslaughter on the grounds of diminished responsibility.

== Incarceration ==
On 23 February 1996, Erskine saved the life of a fellow serial killer Peter Sutcliffe. Sutcliffe was attacked in his room in Broadmoor Hospital's Henley Ward by Paul Wilson, a convicted robber, who asked to borrow a videotape before attempting to strangle him with the cable from a pair of stereo headphones. Erskine and convicted murderer Jamie Devitt intervened upon hearing screams.

== Documentaries ==
Erskine's crimes have been the subject of multiple documentaries:

- On 8 May 2014, an episode of eminent criminologist David Wilson's series First Kill/Last Kill documented Erskine's crimes. The episode was titled The OAP Killer and was shown on Channel 5.
- On 12 August 2021, an episode of New Scotland Yard Files aired which focused on Erskine. It was presented by former New Scotland Yard detective Peter Bleksley and aired on CBS Reality.

== See also ==
- Gerontophilia
- List of serial killers in the United Kingdom
- List of serial killers by number of victims
