= Endeavor Health =

Coordinates: 42°03′56.6″N 87°41′3.3″W

Geography
- Location: Illinois, United States

Organization
- Care system: Not-for-profit
- Type: Teaching

Services
- Emergency department: Evanston - Level I Glenbrook - Level II; Highland Park - Level II; Skokie - Level II; Endeavor Swedish - Level II; Northwest - Level II
- Beds: over 1200

History
- Founded: 1891; 135 years ago

Links
- Website: www.endeavorhealth.org
- Lists: Hospitals in Illinois

Endeavor Health is a privately owned health system in the Chicago metropolitan area, Illinois, United States. It was formed in 2022 through the merger of NorthShore University Health System and Edward-Elmhurst Health.

As of 2026, Endeavor operates nine hospitals. As of 2021, its medical group operates 70 offices with approximately 800 primary and specialty care physicians, as well as a Research Institute and Foundation. In total, the health system employs more than 27,000 people.

== History ==
=== NorthShore University Health System ===
NorthShore was founded as Evanston Hospital in 1891 during an outbreak of typhoid fever. In the early 1900s Evanston Hospital expanded and became a teaching hospital.

Louis W. Sauer developed a vaccine for whooping cough (pertussis) at Evanston Hospital in the 1920s. The hospital became affiliated with Northwestern University and the Feinberg School of Medicine in the 1930s.

The original Kellogg Cancer Care Center was demolished in 2008 and a new building opened in 2010. The four-story building incorporated the original center and houses all oncology services in the hospital. Its 22,000 square feet doubled the space of the previous center and provided space for multi-disciplinary care, including onsite patient access to medical oncologists, surgical oncologists, radiologists, pharmacists, financial aid and support staff.

Highland Park Hospital joined NorthShore in 2000. Skokie Hospital, formerly Rush North Shore Medical Center, was transferred to NorthShore in January 2009.

NorthShore University HealthSystem absorbed Swedish (Covenant) Hospital in 2020 and Northwest Community Hospital in 2021.

In 2022, ENH merged with Edward-Elmhurst Health, creating a nine hospital group. The merger closed January 5, 2022, with the combined entity now known as Endeavor.

== Locations ==
As of 2025, Endeavor Health operates nine hospitals:

- Edward Hospital
- Elmhurst Hospital
- Evanston Hospital
- Glenbrook Hospital
- Highland Park Hospital
- Linden Oaks Hospital
- Northwest Community Hospital
- Skokie Hospital
- Endeavor Swedish Hospital

=== Evanston Hospital ===
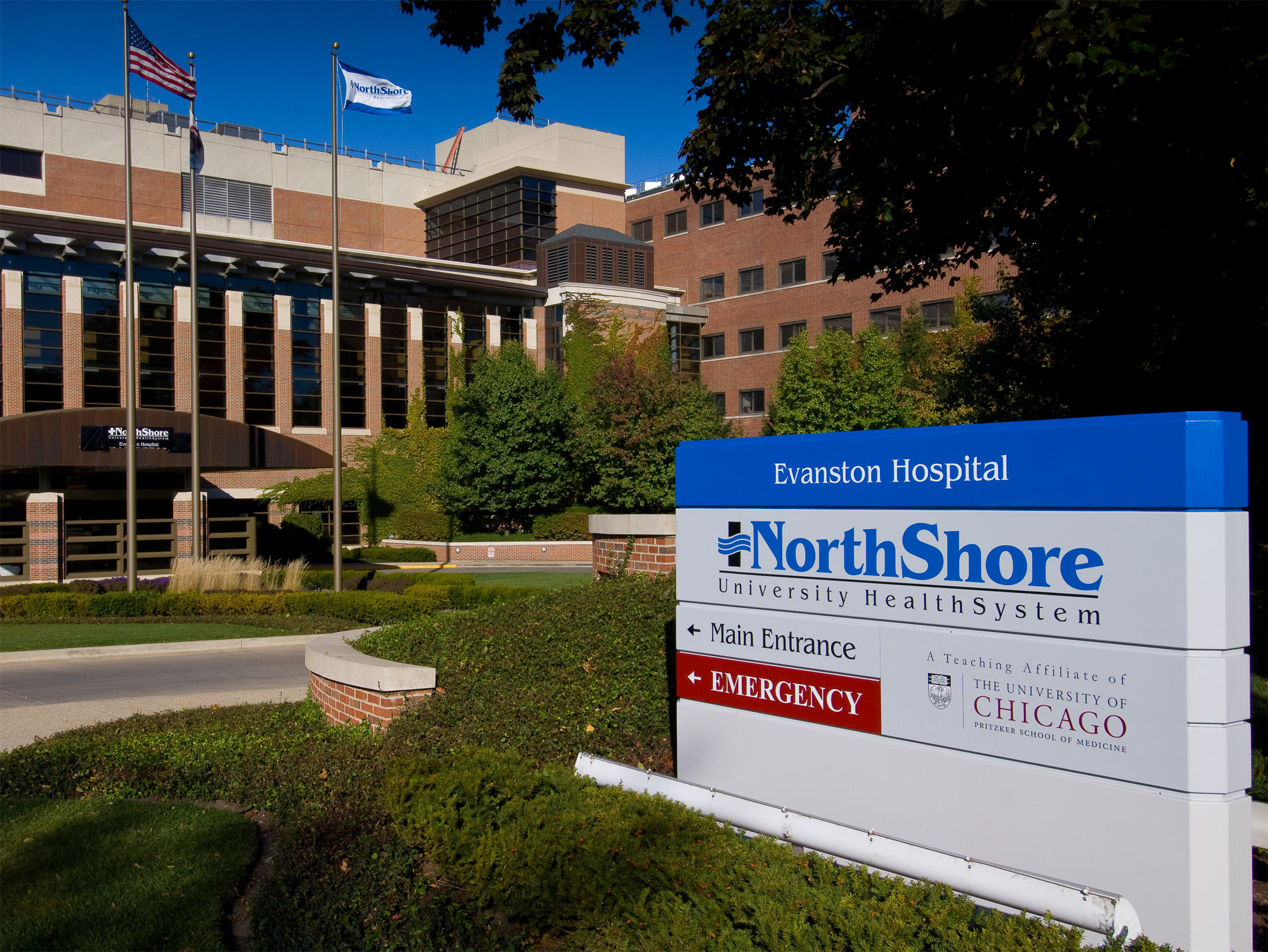
Evanston Hospital

Evanston Hospital is located north of downtown Evanston at 2650 Ridge Avenue at its intersection with Central Street. It serves as the flagship facility for NorthShore.

The hospital has a Level I trauma center and a Women's Hospital and Cardiovascular Care Center. The Kellogg Cancer Center recently opened in its brand new facility on the campus.

=== Glenbrook Hospital ===
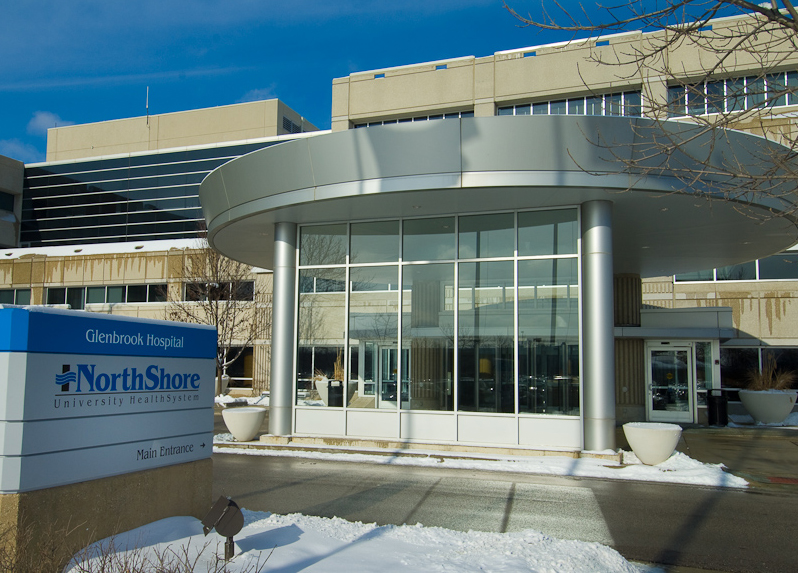
Glenbrook Hospital

Glenbrook Hospital sits at 2100 Pfingsten Road in Glenview, Illinois. The facility was built in 1977. Glenbrook offers cardiac catheterization and ultra fast CT scan, total hip and knee replacement, the Eye and Vision Center for LASIK and other eye surgery, and neurological services including a new sleep center, a cognitive and memory disorder program and a Parkinson's Disease clinic. The hospital serves the communities of Glenview and Northbrook, as well as the surrounding communities. The hospital serves as a point of dispensing (POD) facility for disaster response.

The hospital has a Level II trauma center and Fast Track service for patients with minor illnesses and injuries.

=== Highland Park Hospital ===
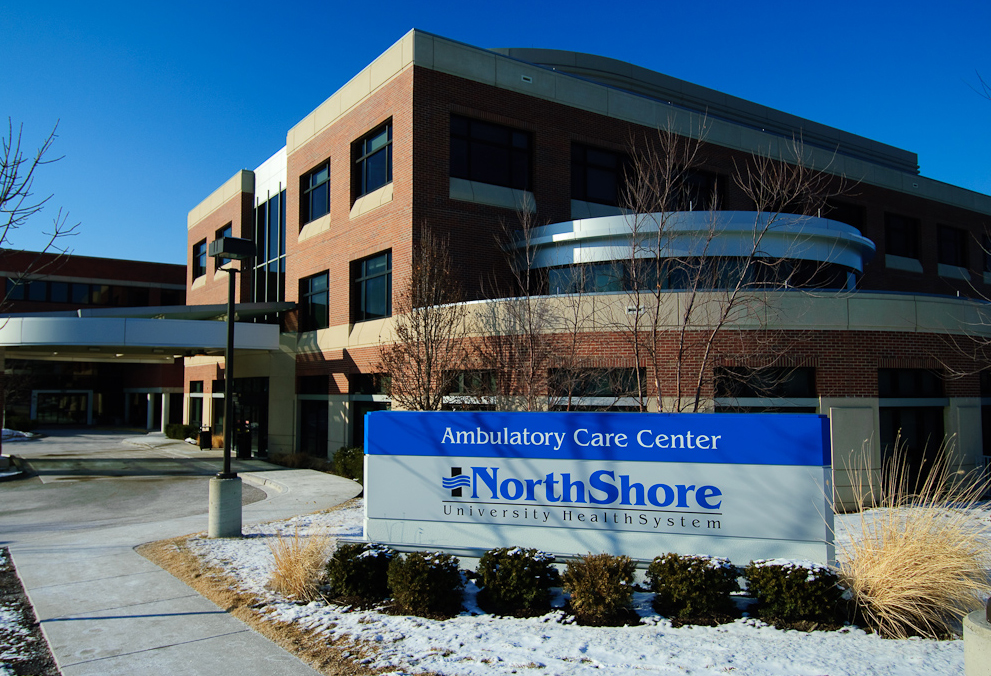
Highland Park Hospital

Highland Park Hospital (HPH) is located a 777 Park Avenue West in Highland Park, Illinois The hospital joined ENH in 2000.

HPH's Kellogg Cancer Center has facilities to offer care to oncology patients in Lake County. The hospital offers care for the following types of cancer: thoracic and lung; hematology; breast; ovarian; head and neck; melanoma and sarcoma; gastrointestinal; prostate; and stomach. Highland Park Hospital also offers a stroke center. Highland Park features a new Ambulatory Care Center and Wound Care Center. The hospital serves as a point of dispensing (POD) facility for disaster response.

=== Skokie Hospital ===
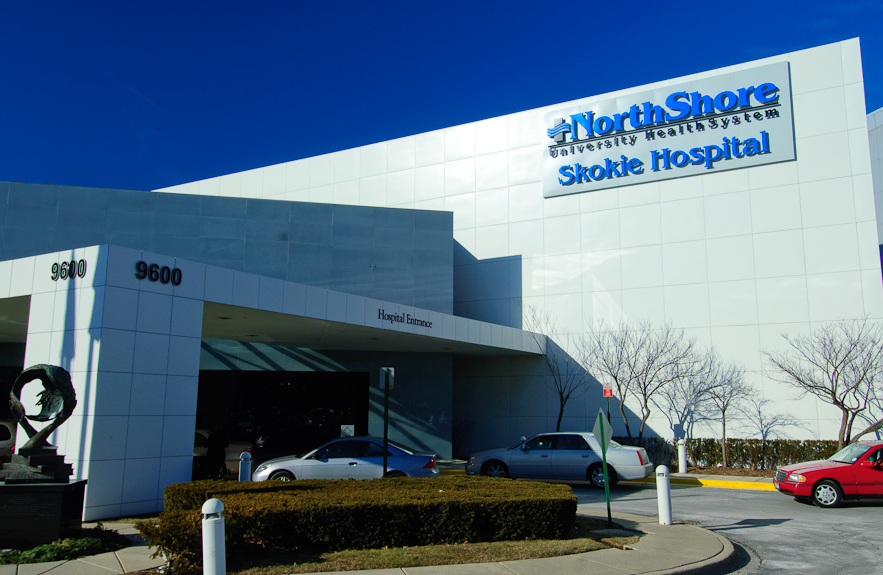
Skokie Hospital

Skokie Hospital, formerly Rush North Shore Medical Center, joined NorthShore University HealthSystem in January 2009. The hospital serves Skokie and the surrounding communities and is located at 9600 Gross Point Road.

=== Endeavor Swedish Hospital ===
Endeavor Swedish Hospital, formerly Swedish Covenant Hospital, joined NorthShore University HealthSystem in January 2020. The hospital serves the north side of Chicago.

=== Northwest Community Hospital ===
Northwest Community Hospital, as of January 2021 joined the Northshore University HealthSystem as part of buyout of Northwest Community Healthcare. The Northwest Community Healthcare Group was to be merged into the NorthShore University HealthSystem within the years ahead.

== Research ==
Established in 1996, the NorthShore Research Institute serves more than 1,000 research projects and more than 150 externally funded research faculty. Priority areas for research are medical genetics, cancer, neurosciences, advanced imaging research, cardiovascular, peri-neonatal and outcomes research. The Research Institute has approximately 125,000 net square feet of research space.

Included is a collaborative building with Northwestern University on its Evanston Campus called the Arthur and Gladys Pancoe-NorthShore University HealthSystem Life Sciences Pavilion, and the Charles R. Walgreen Jr. Building on the Evanston Hospital campus. Emphasis is on translational and clinical research allowing discoveries from the basic sciences and engineering to be brought promptly to the bedside. Funding from the National Institutes of Health (NIH) places the hospitals of NorthShore University HealthSystem at No. 9 among multi-specialty independent research hospitals in the country.

== COVID-19 Vaccination Lawsuit ==
In 2021, Northshore University Health System was sued by 14 employees who were denied a religious exemption from taking the COVID-19 jab and fired from their jobs or compelled to get vaccinated. As part of the settlement awarded in the federal Northern District Court of Illinois, Northshore was ordered to rehire the workers and pay them a total of $10.3 million in damages. The 14 plus dismissed employees from Northshore were joined by other fired healthcare workers for a class-action suit on behalf of 523 individuals, each of whom was awarded $25,000 plus additional monetary damages if they later complied and took the vaccine. NorthShore also agreed to rehire and adjust its vaccination policy to accommodate for exemptions. This was the first nationwide, class-action injunction against a private employer. While this was not the first legal decision protecting workers from being permanently fired for refusing the shot, it did set precedent as the first case in the U.S. in which petitioners were awarded monetary damages for abrogation of their Title VII rights.
