= Theodore Johnson (serial killer) =

Jamaican-born English serial killer

- Born: 1954 (age 71–72); Jamaica
- Convictions: Murder; Manslaughter (2 counts)
- Penalty: Life imprisonment (minimum of 26 years; increased to 30 years by the Court of Appeal)

Details
- Victims: 3
- Span of crimes: 1981–2016
- Country: England
- States: West Midlands, London
- Date apprehended: For the final time on 15 December 2016

Theodore Johnson (born 1954) is a Jamaican-born English serial killer who killed his wife and two ex-girlfriends over a span of four decades. After the murder of his last victim, Angela Best, he was sentenced to life in prison with a minimum of 26 years. The Court of Appeal later increased Johnson's minimum sentence to 30 years.

== Biography ==
Johnson was born in Jamaica as one of 11 children, working on a banana plantation. He moved to the United Kingdom in 1980 with his wife Yvonne, and started working at a car repair service centre shortly before killing his first wife.

=== Murder of Yvonne Johnson ===
In 1981, an argument began between Johnson and Yvonne after she would not let him go to church for being "not dressed well enough". Johnson hit Yvonne over the head with a vase, before pushing her out off the balcony from the couple's ninth-floor Wolverhampton home. He was convicted of manslaughter, and sentenced to three years in prison.

=== Murder of Yvonne Bennett ===
Eleven years after killing his first wife, Johnson met Yvonne Bennett in Wolverhampton. The couple moved to Finsbury Park in north London together, with Yvonne giving birth to a daughter, but separated after Johnson discovered that she was having an affair. He began stalking Yvonne, and at one point had to be removed from the house by police days before her death. In 1993, while their 2-year-old daughter was sleeping, Johnson strangled Bennett with a belt at their home. He then phoned the police to confess his crime and unsuccessfully tried to hang himself from a tree before giving himself up to authorities.

At his trial at the Old Bailey, it was claimed that he suffered from depression and a personality disorder. He pleaded guilty to manslaughter on the grounds of diminished responsibility. He was found guilty and sent to a mental institution.

=== Murder of Angela Best ===
In September 1994, Johnson was allowed out of the psychiatric ward for the first time on escorted parole, and in mid-1995, he was allowed to spend two days at a City and Guilds course on furniture restoration by himself. There, he met 51-year-old mother-of-four Angela Best, who had moved to Tottenham from Manchester, and they quickly began a relationship. Johnson was released by a mental health tribunal in October 1997, on condition that he notified the supervising doctors and social workers about any relationship with women he formed. However, he did not reveal his relationship with Best until shortly before her death. During a visit by authorities to his Dartmouth Park home, a wood carving spelling out "Love" was found on Johnson's mantelpiece, but the object did not arouse any suspicion.

In September 2016, the couple split up after Angela found out about Johnson's previous convictions in a detailed letter, with Best saying that she had felt the "happiest" she had ever been after finding love with someone else, despite Johnson continuing to profess his undying love for her daily. When he was visited by a social worker and psychiatrist on 8 December 2016, he was not found to be in a depressive state and still denied being in a relationship. Two days before Best's murder, he had another appointment, but it was called off because his social worker was sick.

On the morning of 15 December, Best visited Johnson at his Islington flat to help with an appointment with the Jamaican embassy. Soon after entering the house, Best was struck at least six times with a claw hammer by Johnson, who finally strangled her with a dressing gown cord despite her efforts to defend herself. Hours after killing her, Johnson proceeded to throw himself in front of an express train at Cheshunt railway station, losing his right arm and left hand in the process. While the medics were treating his injuries, authorities visited his home and discovered Best's body in the living room.

==== Trial and sentence ====
At trial, the now-wheelchair-using Johnson confessed to killing Angela Best, and was sentenced to 26 years imprisonment. His lawyer, Annette Henry QC, said that he would likely die behind bars and that: "He does not wish to be alive. He hates himself for what happened." The crown later appealed and Johnson's sentence was increased from a minimum of 26 years to a minimum of 30.

Best's family, among them her son Raphael and her sisters Lorraine Jones and Valerie Archibold, described her loss as "immeasurable", adding that she loved her children and grandchildren dearly.

Camden and Islington NHS Trust, which was responsible for Johnson's care in the community since 2004, said it would provide Best's family with an independent report and that Johnson's treatment complied with conditions set by the Mental Health Tribunal which oversaw his discharge in 1997.

== See also ==
- List of serial killers in the United Kingdom
