= Northwest Community Hospital =

Hospital in Illinois USA, opened 1959

- Endeavor Health
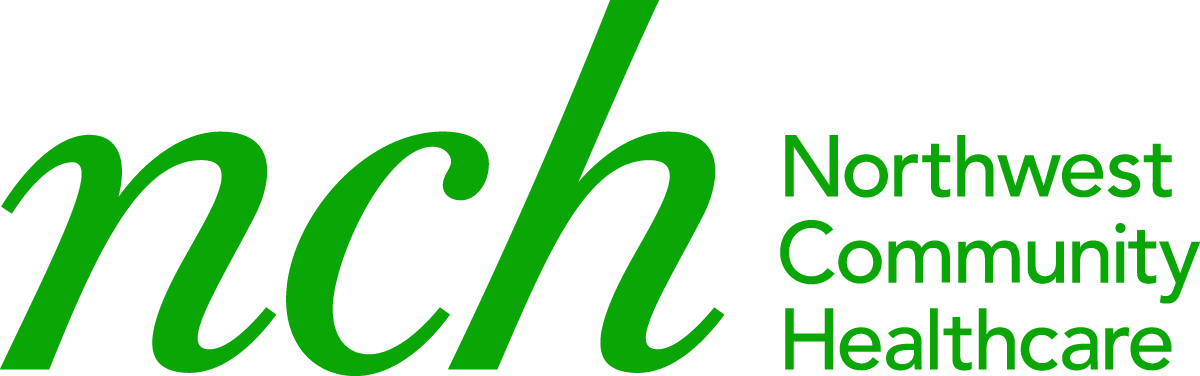

Geography
- Location: 800 W. Central Road, Arlington Heights, Illinois 60005, United States
- Coordinates: 42.068378°N 87.992166°W

Organization
- Type: Acute care
- Affiliated university: None

Services
- Emergency department: Level 2 Trauma Center
- Beds: 489

History
- Founded: December 2, 1959

Links
- Website: www.endeavorhealth.org/locations/northwest-community-hospital/
- Lists: Hospitals in the United States

Northwest Community Hospital (NCH) is a 489-bed acute care hospital in Arlington Heights, Illinois, United States. Opened in 1959, the hospital serves 200,000 outpatients and 20,000 inpatients annually. The hospital operates a Level 2 Trauma Center, Level III NICU, a pediatric emergency department and a Comprehensive Stroke Center. NCH has four Immediate Care locations in the northwest suburbs and operates a walk-in clinic in Palatine.

NCH has a medical staff of more than 1,000 physicians, which includes the board-certified primary care doctors and specialists of the NCH Medical Group.

== History ==
Northwest Community Hospital was established in 1959. In January 2021, NorthShore University HealthSystem acquired Northwest Community Hospital. With the merger, Northwest Community Hospital became the sixth hospital in the NorthShore Health system.
