= William F. Connell =

American industrialist and philanthropist (1938–2001)

William F. Connell (1938–2001) was an American industrialist and philanthropist who served as chairman and chief executive officer of Connell Limited Partnership.

== Early life ==
Connell was born in Lynn, Massachusetts to William and Theresa Connell, both immigrants from Ireland. He graduated from St. Mary's High School, Boston College (BA 1959), and Harvard Business School (MBA 1963) and served in the United States Army.

== Business career ==
Connell worked for Litton Industries before joining Ogden Corporation as assistant treasurer. At Ogden he rose to the position of executive vice president. In 1985 Ogden sold seven of its industrial companies to its employees and Connell became the chief executive officer and chairman of the newly formed Avondale Industries. In September 1986, the president of Avondale's shipyard division attempted to oust Connell, which led to a legal battle between the two sides. The dispute ended in January 1987 when Connell purchased Avondale's six other divisions to form Connell Limited Partnership.

Connell was a director of the Bank of Boston, General Cinema Corporation, Suffolk Downs, Boston Edison Company, Arthur D. Little, FleetBoston Financial, Harcourt General, and the Greater Boston Chamber of Commerce, a trustee of Boston College and the Boston Symphony Orchestra, and a Museum of Science. Connell was influential in the merger of BankBoston and FleetBank and was a part of a group of Boston businessmen who brokered a deal that kept the New England Patriots from moving to Connecticut.

== Philanthropy ==
Connell died of melanoma on August 22, 2001 at his home in Swampscott, Massachusetts. He was 63 years old. Shortly before his death he donated $10 million to Boston College's School of Nursing, which was renamed the William F. Connell School of Nursing in 2003. He also left $5 million to St. Mary's High School, who used the money to construct the William F. Connell Center, which houses a chapel, classrooms, and a technology center. In 2003, a donation from Connell's family helped launch the Harvard Business School's Leadership Initiative. That same year, HBS renamed its Fowler House the Connell House. In 2013, the Connell family donated $10 million to establish the Margot and William F. Connell Family MBA Program Innovation Fund at Harvard Business School.
