= Geordie Bourne =

Scottish criminal

Geordie Bourne (or Burn) (died 1597) was a well-known thief or raider in the English East Marches land that bordered the Kingdom of Scotland.

He and his band of men were attacked by a patrol led by Robert Carey, 1st Earl of Monmouth Lord Warden of the Marches (1596–98). During the assault, Bourne's uncle was killed and Geordie was beaten into surrender. After his arrest, he was found guilty of March Treason and sentenced to death. Many in the garrison were deeply concerned about executing the prisoner because it seemed to be common knowledge that the convict was a friend of the Scottish Middle March Warden Robert Ker of Cessford. The condemned man was given a 24-hour reprieve and riders were sent to Cessford to invite his intervention. There was no response.

Meanwhile, Robert Carey, masquerading as a member of his own garrison, interviewed Bourne in his cell. According to Carey's 'Memoirs', Geordie Bourne confessed that

"he had lain with above forty men’s wives, what in England, what in Scotland; and that he had killed seven Englishmen with his own hands, cruelly murdering them: that he had spent his whole time in whoring, drinking, stealing, and taking deep revenge for slight offences".

He spent his final hours repenting to a preacher, Mr Selby, and was executed the next morning.

== See also ==
- List of serial killers in the United Kingdom
