= Robin Ligus =

English serial killer (1952–2022)

- Born: Robin Stanislaw Ligus; 6 March 1952; Baschurch, Shropshire, England
- Died: 16 December 2022 (aged 70); Birmingham, England

Details
- Victims: 3
- Country: England
- State: Shropshire

Robin Stanislaw Ligus (6 March 1952 – 16 December 2022) was a convicted English serial killer. In 1996, he was convicted of murdering Robert Young and jailed for life. In 2011, Ligus was charged with three additional murders, found guilty of two, and ordered to be detained indefinitely in a secure hospital, having suffered from the effects of a stroke.

== Victims ==
- Trevor Bradley (aged 53), found in a burned-out car in Melverley.
- Brian Coles (aged 57), found in his home in Higher Heath, near Whitchurch, having been beaten to death with an iron bar.
- Robert Young (aged 75), killed in Shrewsbury during a burglary of his home.

Ligus was charged with the murder of Bernard Czyzewska but was found not guilty. Czyzewska drowned after being thrown into the River Severn near Porthill Bridge in Shrewsbury on 30 November 1994.

== Death ==
Ligus died on 16 December 2022 at the age of 70.

== See also ==
- List of serial killers in the United Kingdom
