= The Weinberg Center for Elder Justice =

The Harry and Jeanette Weinberg Center for Elder Justice at The Hebrew Home at Riverdale
- Founded: 2005; 21 years ago
- Founded at: New York City, U.S.
- Type: Non-profit
- Purpose: To champion justice and dignity for older adults.
- Headquarters: 5901 Palisade Ave, Riverdale, New York 10471
- Services: Elder abuse shelter, elder justice advocacy
- Website: theweinbergcenter.org
- Formerly called: The Harry and Jeanette Weinberg Center for Elder Abuse Prevention at The Hebrew Home at Riverdale

The Harry and Jeanette Weinberg Center for Elder Justice at The Hebrew Home at Riverdale is an elder abuse prevention and intervention non-profit organization that provides shelter for older adults who have experienced abuse in the community. it is headquartered in Riverdale, New York

== History ==
Established in 2005 by the Hebrew Home at Riverdale, the Weinberg Center emerged as the nation's first regional elder abuse shelter, providing direct assistance to older adults affected by domestic violence Over time, the center has expanded its services within the fields of elder abuse and elder justice.

== Outreach and training ==
The Weinberg Center provides instruction and community outreach programs aimed at raising awareness among professionals and the public awareness about the signs and symptoms of elder abuse and neglect.

An older adult seated on the grounds of The Hebrew Home

== SPRiNG Alliance ==
The Weinberg Center established the SPRiNG (Shelter Partners: Regional, National, Global) Alliance, a professional network of shelters aimed at organizing ongoing shelter-creation efforts. The SPRiNG Alliance's mission is to develop a network of regional elder abuse shelters and similar service models. The Alliance facilitates monthly phone calls, maintains a website with shared resources, and organizes an annual symposium in collaboration with its partners.

== See also ==
- Harry and Jeanette Weinberg Foundation
