= Erline P. McGriff =

American professor of nursing (1924–2004)

Erline Perkins McGriff (February 18, 1924 Petersburg, Virginia – December 24, 2004) was a professor of nursing at the New York University Rory Meyers College of Nursing. She became Division Head in 1976 helping to expand the graduate division of the school. McGriff also served as the director of the Division of Nursing at Trenton State College.

== Education ==
McGriff graduated from the Lucy Webb Hayes School of Nursing at Sibley Memorial Hospital in 1945. She earned her B.S. (nursing, 1950) and M.S. (administration in nursing services, 1953) degrees in Nursing Education from The Catholic University of America and her Ed.D. (administration in nursing education, 1967) from Teachers College, Columbia University.

== Publications ==
- Hurley, Patricia M.; McGriff, Erline P. (January 1995). "Nursing education and the HIV/AIDS pandemic". Journal of the Association of Nurses in AIDS Care. 6 (1): 49–52. doi:10.1016/S1055-3290(05)80030-5. ISSN 1055-3290. PMID 7734722.
