= Stephen Akinmurele =

Nigerian-English serial killer (1978–1999)

- Born: Stephen Oladimeji K. Akinmurele; 16 March 1978; Nigeria
- Died: 28 August 1999 (aged 21); Manchester Prison, Manchester, England
- Cause of death: Suicide by hanging
- Other name: The Cul-De-Sac Killer
- Motive: Gerontophobia

Details
- Victims: 5–7
- Span of crimes: 1995–1998
- Country: United Kingdom

Stephen Oladimeji K. Akinmurele (16 March 1978 – 28 August 1999) was a Nigerian-English serial killer who was charged with murdering five elderly people between 1995 and 1998.

Initially, he was charged with the murder of an elderly couple, Eric Boardman and Joan Boardman. His third suspected crime was the murder of Jemimah Cargill. After Cargill, he was also charged with the murders of Dorothy Harris and Marjorie Ashton.

Akinmurele was born in Nigeria to a Nigerian father and a British mother. He and his mother moved to the Isle of Man in 1988, before he moved to Blackpool, England, to work as a barman.

Akinmurele had a history of mental illness and had committed crimes against the elderly from the age of 11. He was drawn to situations in which he would encounter the elderly, with the police asserting he got a "kick" out of killing old people. Akinmurele confessed to a number of the murders, but killed himself before his trial. Police believe he may have also been responsible for two further killings. The case is notable due to Akinmurele's long-standing hatred of elderly people.

== Victims ==
The victims in the case were all senior citizens; the lead investigator in the case noted that Akinmurele had a "pathological hatred" of old people. He was dubbed the "Cul-de-Sac Killer" due to his choice of elderly victims living in quiet suburban streets.

His first two known victims were Eric Boardman, 77, and his wife Joan Boardman, 74. Both were murdered at their home in Blackpool on 30 October 1998. One of their daughters discovered their bodies. Eric, who had been beaten to death, was found under a wardrobe in the hallway of their home. Joan had been strangled to death and was left on the living room floor. Akinmurele used batteries bound together to make a cosh, which was found beneath Eric's body. Akinmurele was arrested and charged with their murders on 1 November 1998.

In the months following his arrest, he was charged with 3 further murders. In November 1998, he was charged with the murder of Jemimah Cargill, 75, who had previously been his landlady. She died in a flat fire in Blackpool in October 1998, prior to the murder of the Boardmans.

In November and December 1998, following a joint investigation between Lancashire and Manx police, he was charged with 2 murders that had taken place on the Isle of Man. First, he was arrested in connection with the murder of Dorothy Harris, 68, who was killed in February 1996. Harris, who had been partially blind and deaf, was found after a house fire at her home in Ballasalla. The second murder was of Marjorie Ashton, 72, who was found strangled in her home, also in Ballasalla, in May 1995.

Detectives in both Lancashire and the Isle of Man believed that Akinmurele may have been responsible for further deaths and carried out re-examinations into house fires and sudden deaths.

While in custody, Akinmurele confessed to three further murders, including that of a rambler on the Isle of Man. He claimed that he had killed the man and buried his body on a cliff overlooking the sea. Manx police found a gun with his fingerprint on it, but found no body despite extensive excavation. Police believe that Akimurelle made these false confessions in order to hide that his motivation to commit the murders was his hatred for the elderly.

== Death ==
Akinmurele died by suicide in Manchester Prison in August 1999, just weeks before his trial. He hanged himself from a window with a ligature

A suicide note was found in his pocket after his death, with Akinmurele having written: "I know it's not right always thinking like this but it's always on my mind. I can't help the way I feel, what I did was wrong — I know that and I feel for them — but it doesn't mean I won't do it again. I'll keep on having this feeling I'm going mad because I can't take any more of this and that's why I'm saying goodbye." He had also written to this mother: "I couldn’t take anymore [sic] of the feeling like how I do now, always wanting to kill".

== See also ==
- List of serial killers in the United Kingdom
