= Nurses Improving Care for Healthsystem Elders =

- Abbreviation: NICHE
- Founded: 1992
- Type: Nursing education and clinical resource program
- Purpose: Geriatric nursing; Patient safety; Age-friendly healthcare
- Headquarters: NYU Rory Meyers College of Nursing
- Location: New York City, U.S.
- Origins: Division of Nursing, NYU
- Method: Clinical education; Quality improvement; Resource development
- Affiliations: New York University
- Website: nicheprogram.org

Nurses Improving Care for Healthsystem Elders (NICHE) is a program of the Hartford Institute for Geriatric Nursing at New York University Rory Meyers College of Nursing, that works to achieve systematic nursing change to benefit hospitalized older patients. Founded in 1992, NICHE has evolved into a national geriatric nursing program comprising over 350 hospitals in more than 40 states as well as parts of Canada, Singapore, and Bermuda.

Unlike similar programs, NICHE does not prescribe how institutions should modify geriatric care; rather, it provides the educational materials, evidence-based practice resources, and a leadership development program necessary to stimulate a change in the culture of healthcare facilities to achieve patient-centered care for older adults.

== History ==
NICHE is based on the 1981 Geriatric Resource Nurse (GRN) model, in which unit-based GRN nurses provided consultation to other staff nurses, leading to improved care of older adults by creating standard protocols for common geriatric problems and enhancing the expertise of staff nurses. Initially a part of the Hartford Foundation's Hospital Outcomes Program for the Elderly (HOPE) multi-site initiative, after funding for the project was provided, the NICHE program was officially created in 1992. Through a rigorous screening process using the Geriatric Institutional Assessment Profile (GIAP), an instrument designed to help hospitals analyze the needs of their elderly patients and determine gaps in geriatric care provision, the NICHE Program has become an integral part of the Hartford Institute since 1996.

In 2006, Hartford Institute received funding from Atlantic Philanthropies to develop a business plan to expand its organizational capacity, improve dramatically the program's "toolkit"—particularly its measurement and reporting capacity—and initiate outreach to accelerate adoption of this program by additional hospitals.

== The NICHE Program ==
The NICHE Program provides the principles, resources, and tools to stimulate a change in the culture of health care facilities and achieve patient-centered care for older adult patients. It is affordable and comprehensive, and benefits hospitals in a number of ways:

- Improved clinical outcomes
- Positive fiscal results
- Enhanced nursing competencies
- Community recognition
- Greater patient, family, and staff satisfaction

NICHE provides hospitals with:

- State-of-the-art training, tools, and resources, including an interactive 24/7 E-learning center
- Project management support/mentoring for NICHE-based hospital initiatives
- Evidence-based clinical protocols that address "never events," Joint Commission compliance and other regulatory imperatives
- Geriatric Institutional Assessment Profile (GIAP) tool
- A community of practice to share information, knowledge, and expertise
