= Gerontophilia =

Sexual attraction toward the elderly

Gerontophilia is the primary sexual attraction to older people. Gerontophilia is poorly defined in academia, leading to skewed statistics and lack of understanding. For instance, whether someone who is sexually attracted to individuals of any age older than their own could be diagnosed or whether the attraction is solely for elderly individuals, remains undecided. A person with such a sexual preference is a gerontophile.

== Etymology ==
The word gerontophilia was coined in 1901 by psychiatrist Richard von Krafft-Ebing. It derives from Greek: geron, meaning "old person" and philia, meaning "friendship". Gerontophilia is classified as a paraphilia, but is not mentioned in the Diagnostic and Statistical Manual of Mental Disorders or International Classification of Diseases.

== History ==
The prevalence of gerontophilia is unknown. A study of pornographic search terms on a peer-to-peer network reported that 0.15% had gerontophilic themes. Sex offenders with elderly victims do not necessarily have gerontophilia. There are other possible motivations for these offenses, such as rage or sadism, or the increased vulnerability of elderly as a social group, which are factors that may not involve a sexual preference for the elderly. There are no studies showing that most such offenders are gerontophiles. In one small study, two of six sex offenders against the elderly showed gerontophilic tendencies. Gerontophilia can also be expressed with consenting elderly partners in a legal context.

Research on gerontophilia is limited to a small number of case studies, beginning with a paper by French physician Charles Féré in 1905. Féré described a 27-year-old man who rejected an arranged marriage with a 20-year-old "beauty" in favor of a 62-year-old woman. Such studies commonly report that the subject had an early sexual experience with a much older woman.

A figurative gerontophilia was a characteristic of Algernon Charles Swinburne's passion for antiquated poets.

== See also ==
- Cougar (slang)
- MILF/DILF
