= New York University Rory Meyers College of Nursing =

NYU Rory Meyers College of Nursing
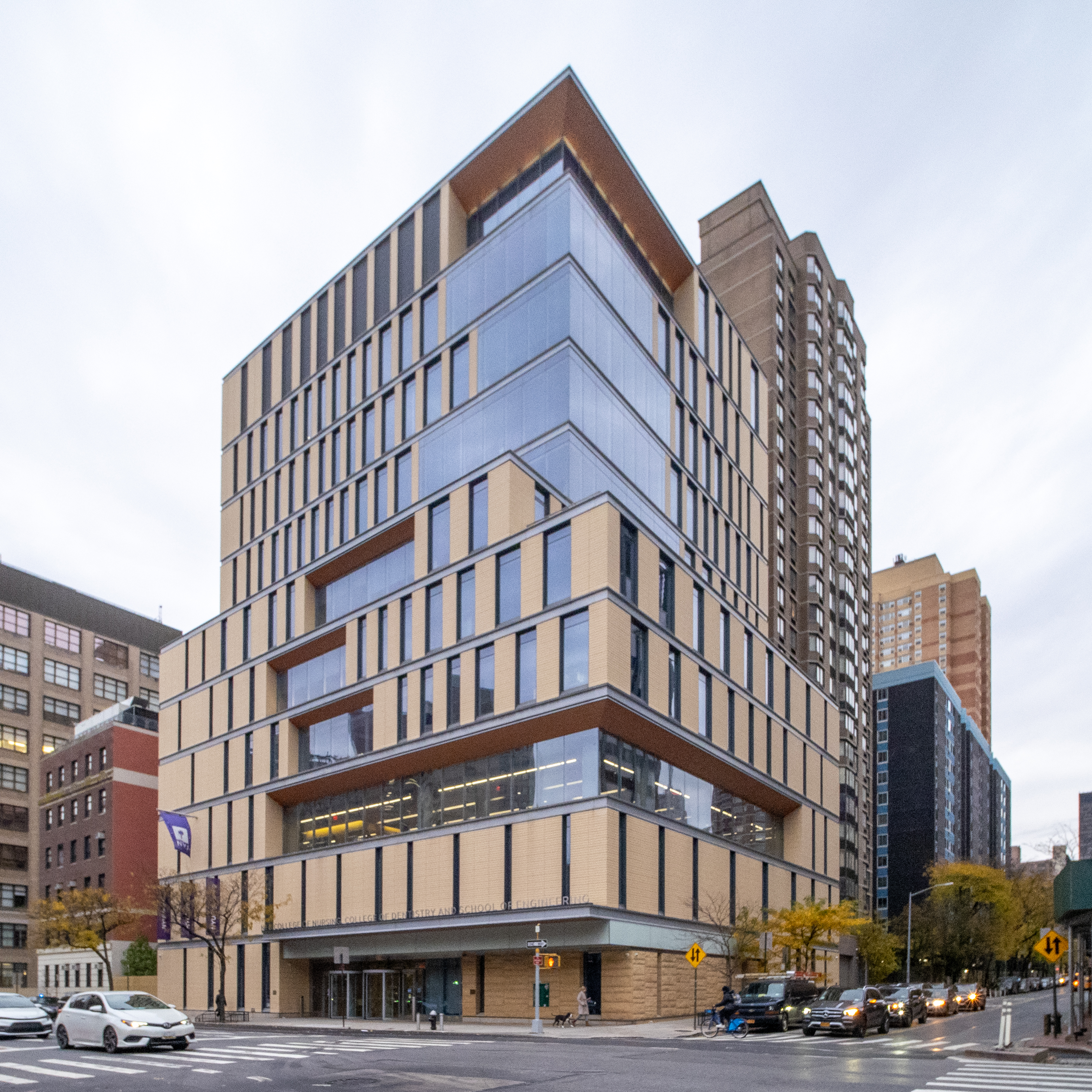
- Type: Private
- Established: 1944
- Parent institution: New York University
- Location: New York City, New York, U.S. 40°45′42.39″N 73°57′37.4″W
- Campus: Urban
- Dean: Angela F. Amar
- Website: nursing.nyu.edu

The New York University Rory Meyers College of Nursing (also referred to as NYU Meyers) offers undergraduate and graduate programs in nursing and clinical experience.

== History ==
Early courses in 1923 ranged from Education in Health and Education in Accident Prevention to courses in the Physical Education Department.

Vera Fry became Director of the Nursing Education Curriculum in 1944 and was the first to articulate goals and philosophy for a nascent nursing department. Under her leadership, the Department of Nursing was established in 1947.

In 1954, Martha E. Rogers became chair of the Department of Nurse Education. With Rogers's leadership, NYU became one of the first universities to treat nursing as a science with a distinct body of knowledge developed through research. Scholarly literature on the development of modern nursing science recognizes Roger’s work from during her time at NYU as a contributing to a shift toward theoretical and research-based nursing practices.

Rogers's groundbreaking model for the Science of Unitary Human Beings provided a theoretical basis for nursing practice, education, and research. Rogers served NYU as a professor and head of the Division of Nursing until 1975, continuing as professor until her retirement in 1979.

Estelle Massey Osborne, assistant professor of nursing at NYU, made lasting contributions in the areas of teaching, public health, administration, publication, research, and community service. In 1931, Osborne became the first African American nurse to receive a master's degree, awarded by Teachers College, Columbia University. In recognition of her leadership, promotion of her professional colleagues, and advancement of nursing, Osborne received many honors and awards, including Nurse of the Year from the NYU Division of Nursing and an honorary membership in the American Academy of Nursing in 1978.

Erline P. McGriff became division head in 1976. During the next decade, McGriff and her successor, Patricia Winstead-Fry, directed a substantial expansion of the master's degree program — in part by enhancing research involvement for graduate students.

Diane O'Neill McGivern led as division head from 1987 to 2001. Under her direction, new academic programs, community-based practices, expanded research initiatives, and growth took place. In the 90s, NYU Nursing initiated graduate clinical programs in advanced practice nursing. A school-based clinic opened in Brooklyn and the Midwifery Program was established. The Muriel and Virginia Pless Center for Nursing Research, the Martha Rogers Center for the Study of Nursing Science, and the John A. Hartford Foundation Institute for Geriatric Nursing were established.

In September 2005, NYU's Division of Nursing moved from the Steinhardt School of Education to form the College of Nursing within the College of Dentistry.

In June 2015, NYU's board of trustees voted to move the College of Nursing to full college status as of the Fall 2015 academic year, becoming one of the three colleges in the new Faculty of Health.

In April 2016, the school announced it would be renamed the NYU Rory Meyers College of Nursing after a $30 million contribution from Rose Marie "Rory" Meyers and her husband Howard Meyers. The donation was the largest gift to an established school of nursing in the history of nursing education.

In 2022 the college introduced an elective course on LGBTQ+ health, addressing disparities in care and gaps in nursing education, developed in response to student demand and broader national discussion of inclusive healthcare training.

== Academic programs and initiatives ==
The college hosts the Oral Health Nursing Education and Practice (OHNEP) program, which was launched in 2011 with the goal of integrating oral health into nursing education and practice. In partnership with the National League for Nursing (NLN), the program contributed oral health teaching strategies to the NLN’s Advancing Care Excellence Resources.

== Research and collaborations ==
NYU Meyers has been designated as a World Health Organization (WHO) Collaborating Center for Gerontological Nursing Education. The center has developed guidelines and training initiatives for geriatric nursing in the Pan American region.

In 2025, the college became a participating institution in the National Institutes of Health-funded Advancing the Science of Palliative Care Research Across the Lifespan (ASCENT) Consortium, a multi-institution research initiative supporting palliative care research infrastructure.

== Facilities ==
The college operates the 10,000-square-foot Joan K. Stout, RN, FAAN Clinical Simulation Learning Center, designed to simulate hospital and outpatient clinical environments for undergraduate and graduate nursing students.

== See also ==
- Erline P. McGriff
