= 37th Scripps National Spelling Bee =

Spelling bee held in the United States in 1964

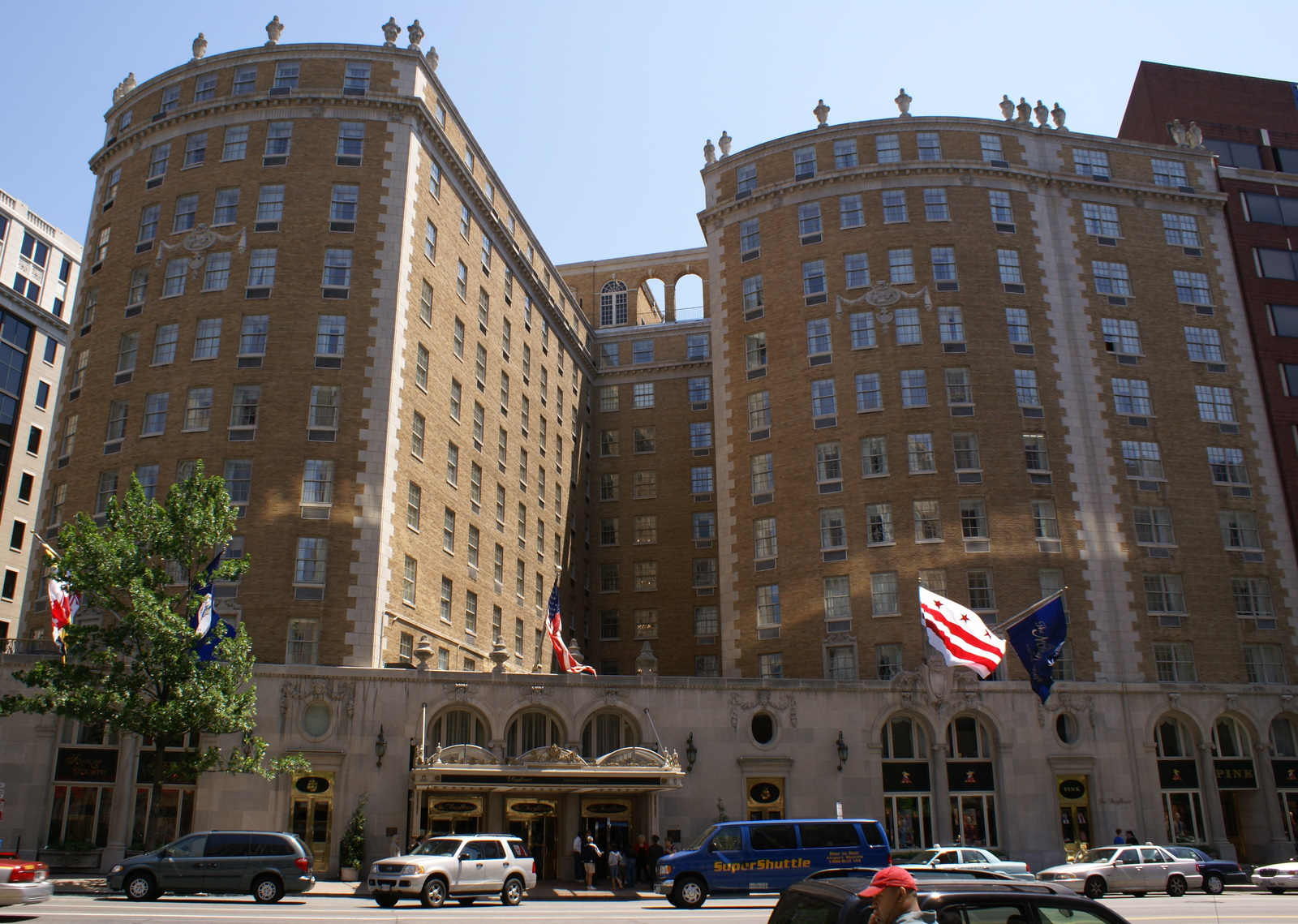
- The Mayflower Hotel, site of the 37th National Spelling Bee
- Date: June 3–4, 1964
- Location: The Mayflower Hotel in Washington, D.C.
- Winner: William Kerek (12 at time of win)
- Sponsor: Akron Beacon Journal
- Sponsor location: Akron, Ohio
- Winning word: sycophant
- No. of contestants: 70
- Pronouncer: Richard R. Baker

The 37th Scripps National Spelling Bee was held in Washington, D.C. at the Mayflower Hotel, on June 3–4, 1964, sponsored by the E.W. Scripps Company.

12-year-old 7th grader William Kerek, from Cuyahoga Falls, Ohio, sponsored by the Akron Beacon Journal, won the competition by correctly spelling the word "sycophant". 13-year-old 8th grader Robert Mathews of Columbus, Ohio took second place, and David Labell of Greensboro, North Carolina was third.

70 contestants participated in the competition, 43 of whom survived into the final day.

Kerek later attended the College of Wooster and Ohio State University and became a physician in the Akron area. As of 2026, Kerek is the fifth speller from the Akron area and sponsored by the Akron Beacon Journal to win the bee, after Dean Lucas in 1927, Alma Roach in 1933, Clara Mohler in 1935, and Jean Chappelear in 1948.
