= 11th Scripps National Spelling Bee =

Spelling bee held in the United States in 1935

11th National Spelling Bee
- Date: May 28, 1935
- Location: National Museum in Washington, D.C.
- Winner: Clara Mohler (13 at time of win)
- Sponsor: Akron Beacon Journal
- Sponsor location: Akron, Ohio
- Winning word: intelligible
- No. of contestants: 20
- Pronouncer: Charles E. Hill

The 11th National Spelling Bee was held in Washington, D.C. at the National Museum on May 28, 1935. Scripps-Howard would not sponsor the Bee until 1941.

The 20 spellers had a banquet at the Hamilton Hotel on the evening of May 27 before proceeding to the National Museum the next day for the competition.

The winner was Clara Mohler, 13, of Ohio, correctly spelling the word interning, which had been misspelled by the prior speller, followed by intelligible. Paul McCusker, 13, of Niagara Falls, New York took second, followed by Bruce Ackerman of Illinois in third.

As of 2026, Mohler is one of five spellers from the Akron area and sponsored by the Akron Beacon Journal to win the Bee, a list that also includes Dean Lucas in 1927, Alma Roach in 1933, Jean Chappelear in 1948, and William Kerek in 1964.

Mohler would complete a degree in foreign languages at Ohio University and was an educator for over 40 years. She died in 2013.
