= 46th Scripps National Spelling Bee =

Spelling bee held in the United States in 1973

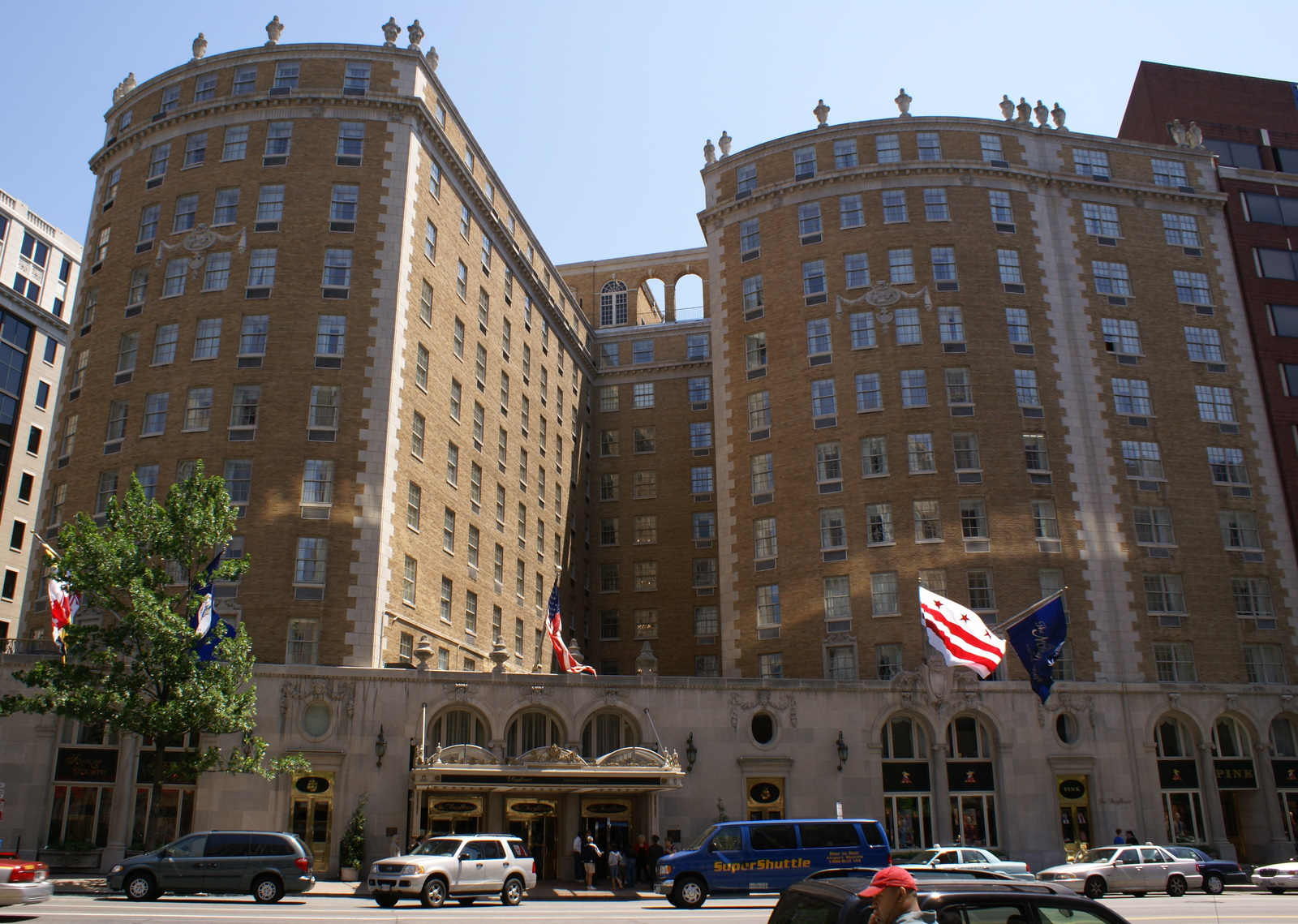
- The Mayflower Hotel, site of the 46th National Spelling Bee
- Date: June 13–14, 1973
- Location: The Mayflower Hotel in Washington, D.C.
- Winner: Barrie Trinkle (13 at time of win)
- Sponsor: Fort Worth Press
- Sponsor location: Fort Worth, Texas
- Winning word: vouchsafe
- No. of contestants: 78
- Pronouncer: Richard R. Baker

The 46th Scripps National Spelling Bee was held in Washington, D.C. at the Mayflower Hotel on June 13–14, 1973, sponsored by the E.W. Scripps Company.

The winner was 13-year-old Barrie Trinkle, a seventh-grader at McLean Middle School in Fort Worth, Texas, spelling "vouchsafe". It was her third time in the national bee; she had finished fifth the prior year (and 28th in 1971), and wore the same blue jumper (her "lucky" dress) that she had worn in her prior bees. Second place went to 14-year old Stephen Hayes of Oxon Hill, Maryland, who fell on "onomastics".

There were 78 entrants this year, from ages 10–14 and grades 5–8. There were 40 girls and 38 boys.

The competition lasted 17 rounds and used 518 words. At the noon break on the first day, 283 words had been used, and the field was reduced to 56. By the end of the first day, seven rounds were completed, 414 words had been used, and the field was reduced to 25. Trinkle won $1,000 for placing first.

Trinkle later became a word panelist for the spelling bee and co-wrote the book How to Spell Like a Champ: Roots, Lists, Rules, Games, Tricks, & Bee-Winning Tips from the Pros (2006).
