= 50th Scripps National Spelling Bee =

Spelling bee held in the United States in 1977

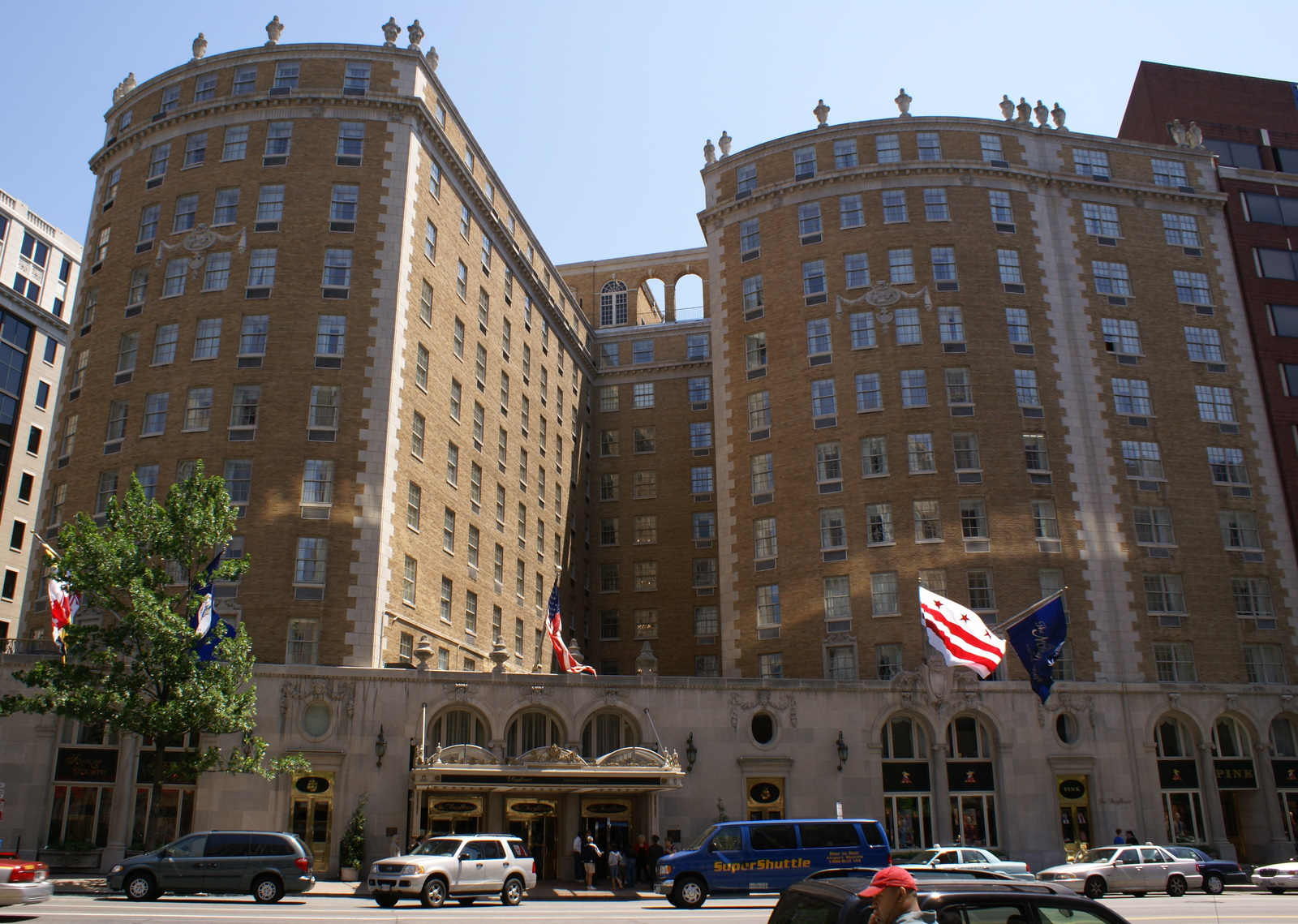
- The Mayflower Hotel, site of the 50th National Spelling Bee
- Date: June 8–9, 1977
- Location: The Mayflower Hotel in Washington, D.C.
- Winner: John Paola (13 at time of win)
- Sponsor: Pittsburgh Press
- Sponsor location: Pittsburgh, Pennsylvania
- Winning word: cambist
- No. of contestants: 94
- Pronouncer: Richard R. Baker

The 50th Scripps National Spelling Bee was held in Washington, D.C. at the Mayflower Hotel on June 8–9, 1977 sponsored by the E.W. Scripps Company.

== Background ==
The competition was won by 13-year-old eighth-grader John Paola of Glenshaw, Pennsylvania, correctly spelling "cambist" (a dealer in foreign bills of exchange). Paola had finished 22nd in the prior year's bee, where he missed svengali.

Second place went to 14-year-old Joan O'Leary of Yonkers, New York, who fell on sesquipedalian. Both O'Leary and Paola had missed "futtock" and "yizkor" before "sesquipedalian" came up. Third-place was captured by Joseph Fumic of North Olmsted, Ohio, who misspelled "triage". Fourth place went to Roxanne Taylor of Forest Hills, New York, who misspelled "mecometer".

Frank Neuhauser (then 63), winner of the 1st Bee, was in the audience at the finals.

This year's competition had 94 spellers (another record), with 57 girls and 36 boys. After seven rounds in the first day of competition, the field was reduced to 26, 17 girls and 9 boys.

A taped version of the finals appeared on television on PBS this year (last previously done in the 1974 bee).
