= 44th Scripps National Spelling Bee =

Spelling bee held in the United States in 1971

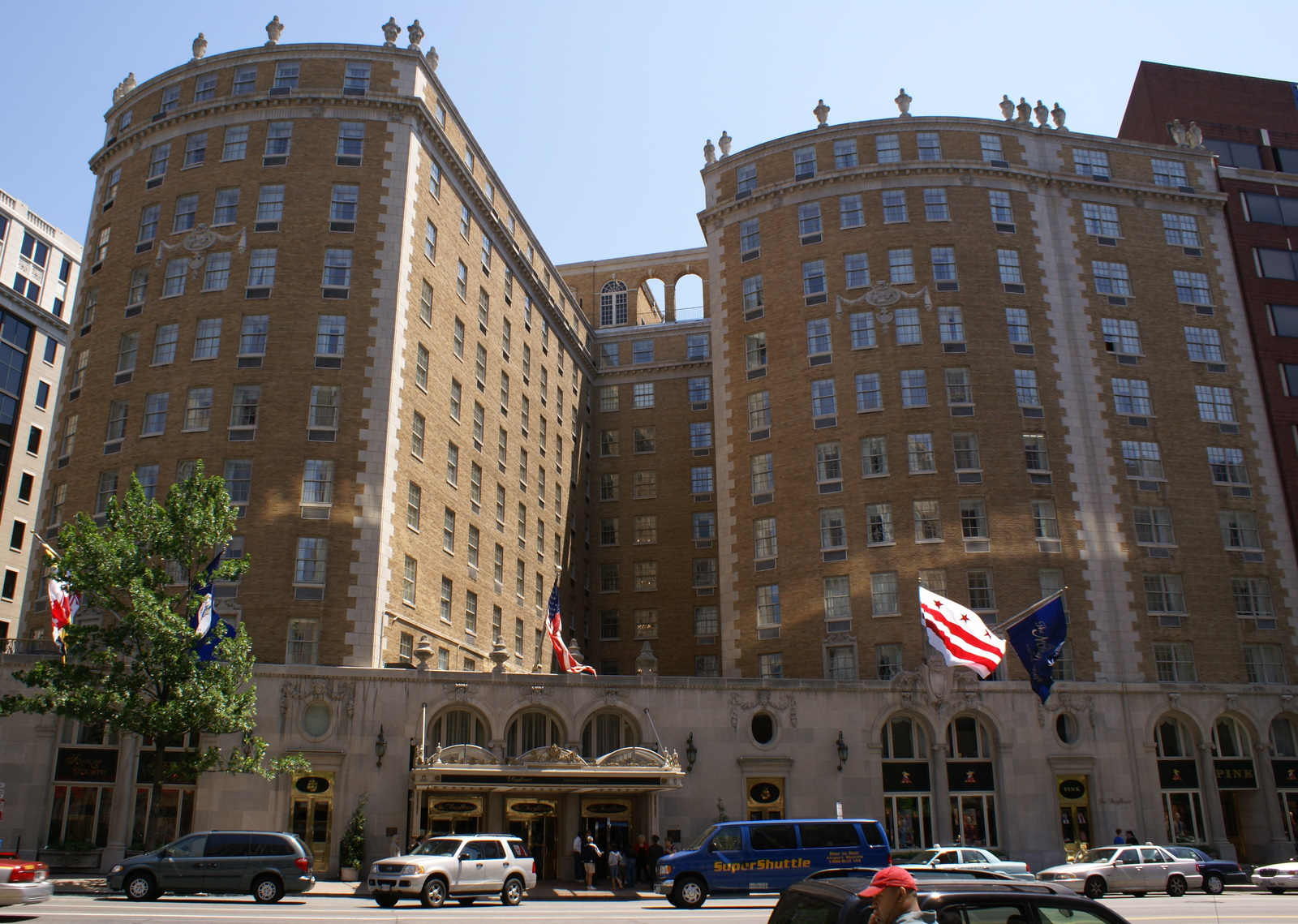
- The Mayflower Hotel, site of the 44th National Spelling Bee
- Date: June 9–10, 1971
- Location: The Mayflower Hotel in Washington, D.C.
- Winner: Jonathan Knisely (12 at time of win)
- Sponsor: Philadelphia Bulletin
- Sponsor location: Philadelphia, Pennsylvania
- Winning word: shalloon
- No. of contestants: 77
- Pronouncer: Richard R. Baker

The 44th Scripps National Spelling Bee was held in Washington, D.C. at the Mayflower Hotel on June 9–10, 1971, sponsored by the E.W. Scripps Company.

Jonathan Knisely of Mullica Hill, New Jersey won the competition, sponsored by the Philadelphia Bulletin. He was followed by Susan O'Malley, 13, of Arizona in second place (misspelling "gigot" as starting with a "j"), and Carolyn Cross of Stow, Ohio in third.

There were 77 contestants this year, 53 girls and 24 boys. The competition lasted 17 rounds, with O'Malley missing the first word she received once the field was narrowed down to two. A total of 633 words were used.

Knisely was the first resident of New Jersey to win the national bee, which would not claim another winner until the 2006 bee. Knisely's brother Alexander finished 17th in the 1967 bee.

Knisely appears in the 2002 documentary Spellbound, where he says "I don't think [winning] really helped me in my love life — my nascent love life. I mean, something like that could be considered something of a liability."
