= 49th Scripps National Spelling Bee =

Spelling bee held in the United States in 1976

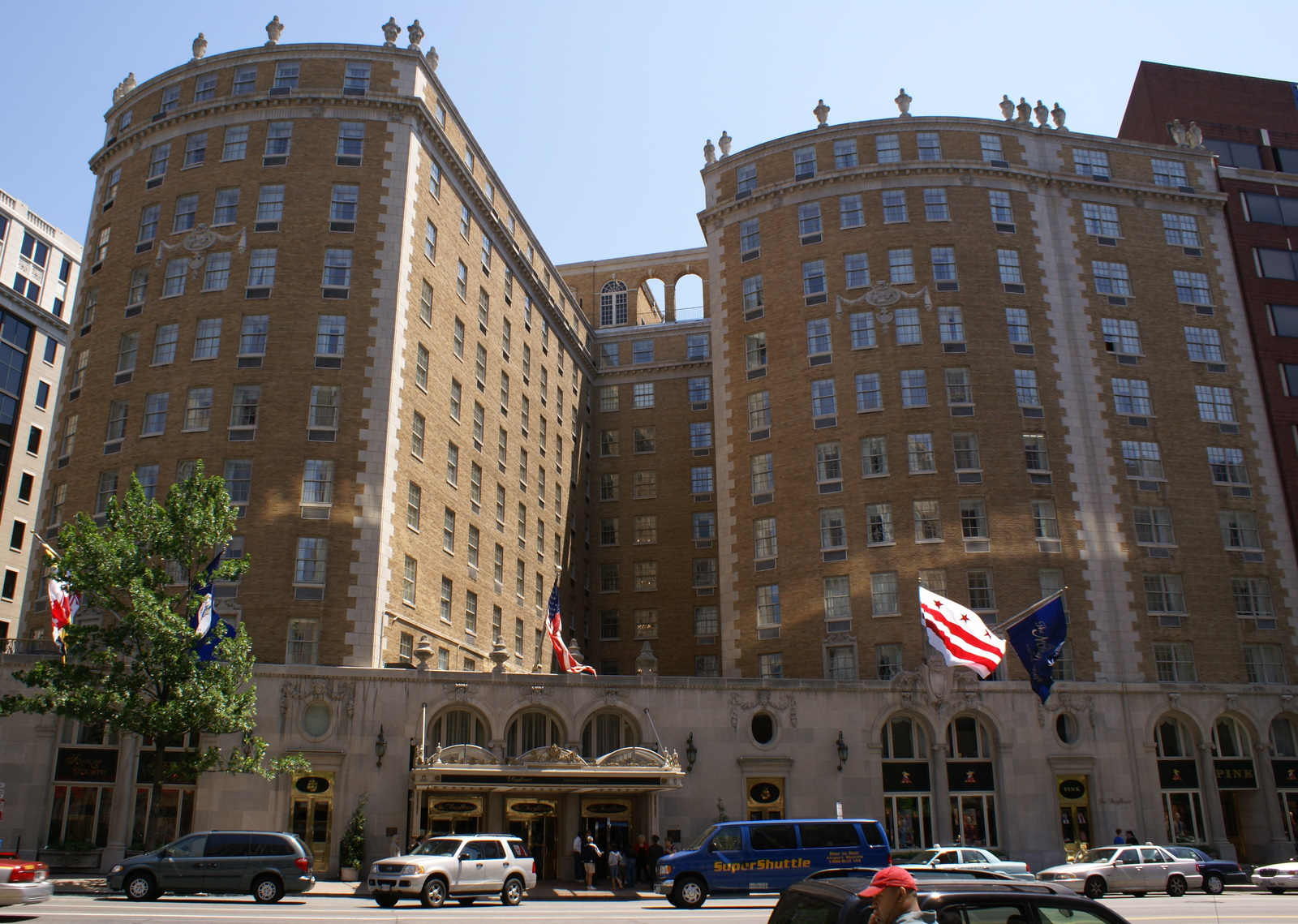
- The Mayflower Hotel, site of the 49th National Spelling Bee
- Date: June 9–10, 1976
- Location: The Mayflower Hotel in Washington, D.C.
- Winner: Tim Kneale (13 at time of win)
- Sponsor: Syracuse Herald-Journal
- Sponsor location: Syracuse, New York
- Winning word: narcolepsy
- No. of contestants: 87
- Pronouncer: Richard R. Baker

The 49th Scripps National Spelling Bee was held in Washington, D.C. at the Mayflower Hotel on June 9–10, 1976, sponsored by the E.W. Scripps Company.

The winner was 13-year-old Tim Kneale of Nedrow, New York, winning on the word "narcolepsy" in the 21st round. Second place went to 13-year-old Rachel Wachtel of Wooster, Ohio, who missed "yarborough." Both missed "emmetropia" and "chorography" in prior rounds before "yarborough" was used. Third place was captured by 13-year-old William Mulhern of Marysville, Kansas, who fell on "balletomane."

The correct words spelled by Kneale also included: fatigue, conceit, opalescent, carafe, egalitarian, supernumerary, persiflage, literati, aphotic, bellipotent, physiolatry, demulcent, hagiology, and sauerbraten.

A record 87 contestants participated this year, up from 79 in 1975 and 80 in 1974. There were 49 girls and 38 boys ranging in age from 10 to 14. There were two repeat spellers, both from the prior year, the smallest number since 1970. Sixty were eliminated in the first day of competition. 525 total words were used this year.

John Paola, who finished 22nd, would go on to win the next year.
