= 5th Scripps National Spelling Bee =

Spelling bee held in the United States in 1929

5th National Spelling Bee
- Date: May 21, 1929
- Location: National Museum in Washington, D.C.
- Winner: Virginia Hogan (12 at time of win)
- Sponsor: Omaha World-Herald
- Sponsor location: Omaha, Nebraska
- Winning word: luxuriance
- No. of contestants: 21
- Pronouncer: Francis A. Litz and Charles E. Hill

The 5th National Spelling Bee was held at the National Museum in Washington, D.C., on May 21, 1929, by the Louisville Courier-Journal. Scripps-Howard would not sponsor the Bee until 1941.

The winner was 12-year-old Virginia Hogan of Nebraska, a student at St. John's Parochial School in Omaha, correctly spelling the word luxuriance, followed by asceticism. In second place came Viola Strbac of Milwaukee, Wisconsin (who had failed to properly spell luxuriance), followed by Teru Hayashi of Ventnor City, New Jersey, a Japanese-American who stumbled on "panacea".

Hogan was first bee winner from her state. She died in Fremont, Nebraska, in 1976. Nebraska did not have another winner until the 40th Bee in 1967.
