= Dominic Antonelli =

Dominic Antonelli may refer to:

- Dominic A. Antonelli (born 1967), NASA astronaut
- Dominic F. Antonelli Jr. (1922–2010), American businessman
