= 45th Scripps National Spelling Bee =

Spelling bee held in the United States in 1972

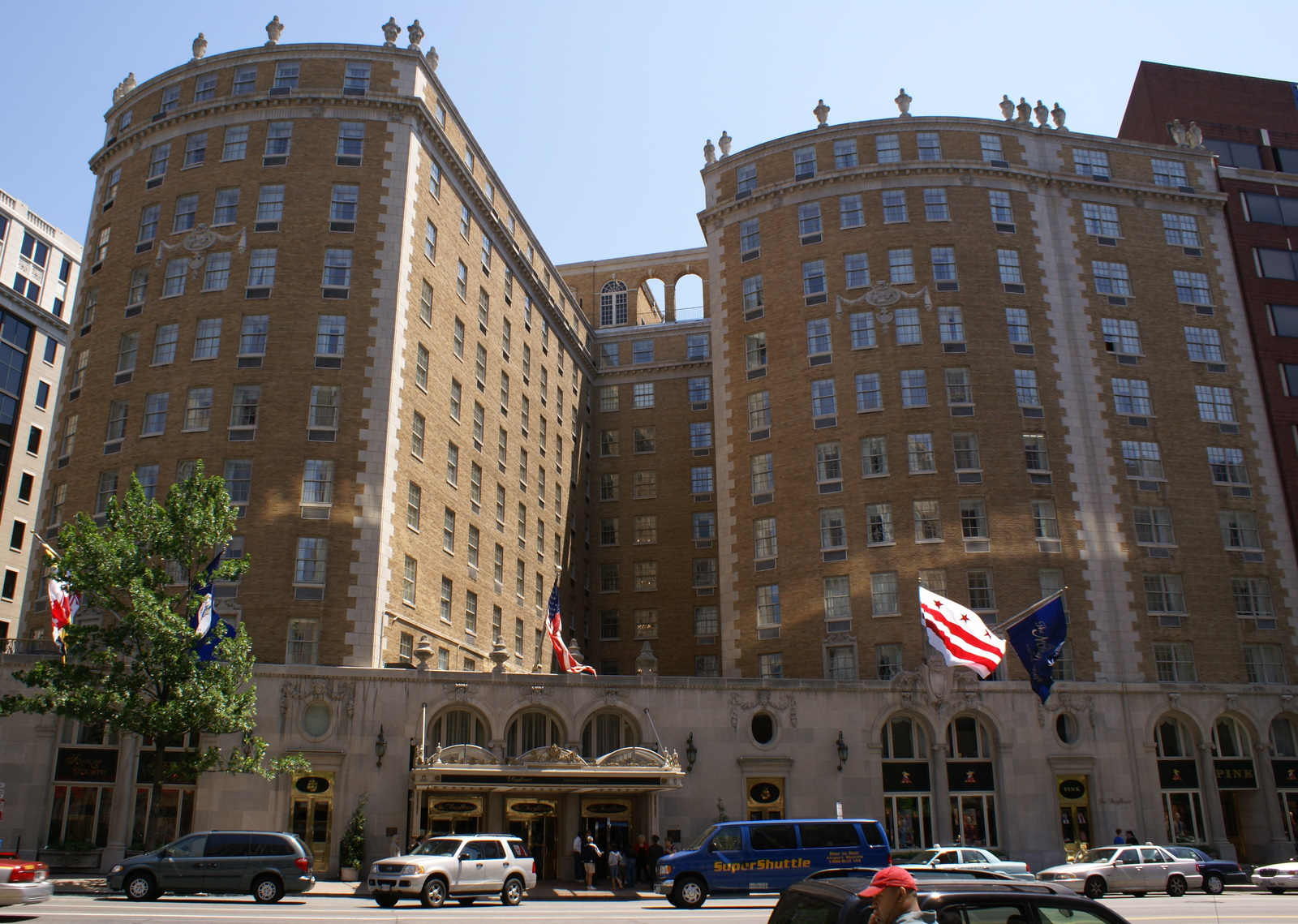
- The Mayflower Hotel, site of the 45th National Spelling Bee
- Date: June 1972
- Location: The Mayflower Hotel in Washington, D.C.
- Winner: Robin Kral (14 at time of win)
- Sponsor: Lubbock Avalanche-Journal
- Sponsor location: Lubbock, Texas
- Winning word: macerate
- No. of contestants: 79
- Pronouncer: Richard R. Baker

The 45th Scripps National Spelling Bee was held in Washington, D.C. at the Mayflower Hotel in June 1972, sponsored by the E.W. Scripps Company.

The winner was 14-year-old Robin Kral of Lamesa, Texas with the word "macerate". Second place went to 13-year-old Lauren H. Pringle of Buffalo, New York. Kral first had a chance to win when Pringle misspelled "polyonymous", but also misspelled it. Pringle then missed "garnett", which Kral correctly spelled, followed by "macerate" for the win.

There were 79 contestants this year, 47 girls and 32 boys. 533 words were used.

Barrie Trinkle of Texas placed fifth this year (falling on "allograph"), and won the next year.
