= 17th Scripps National Spelling Bee =

Spelling bee held in the United States in 1941

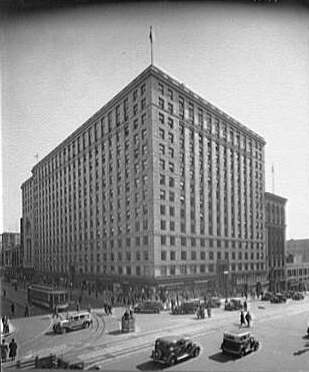
- National Press Building, Washington, D.C.
- Date: May 28, 1941
- Location: Auditorium of the National Press Building
- Winner: Louis Edward Sissman (13 at time of win)
- Sponsor: The Detroit News
- Sponsor location: Detroit, Michigan
- Winning word: initials
- No. of contestants: 29

The 17th Scripps National Spelling Bee was held in Washington, District of Columbia on May 28, 1941. This was the first year that Scripps-Howard (now E.W. Scripps Company) hosted the event.

The winner was 13-year-old Louis Edward Sissman of Detroit, Michigan, correctly spelling the word initials. Phyllis Davis of Ohio placed second, misspelling "chrysanthemum" (which Sissman proceeded to spell correctly), and third went to 13-year-old Homer Lyon, Jr., of Miami, Florida, who fell on "ague."

The first place prize was $500, followed by $300 for second.

As of 2026, Sissman is the only Bee winner from Michigan. At the time of his win, it was widely reported that he was the first boy to win since 1927, apparently overlooking that Ward Randall won in 1931, which was still a ten-year gap.
