= 7th Scripps National Spelling Bee =

Spelling bee held in the United States in 1931

7th National Spelling Bee
- Date: May 27, 1931
- Location: National Museum in Washington, D.C.
- Winner: Ward Randall (12 at time of win)
- Sponsor: White Hall Register-Republican
- Sponsor location: White Hall, Illinois
- Winning word: foulard
- No. of contestants: 23
- Pronouncer: Samuel M. North and Charles E. Hill

The 7th National Spelling Bee was held at the National Museum in Washington, D.C., on May 27, 1931. Scripps-Howard would not sponsor the Bee until 1941.

The winner was 12-year-old Ward Randall of White Hall, Illinois, correctly spelling the word foulard. Charles Michel, 14, of Bellaire, Ohio took second (misspelling foulard as folard), followed by Mary Scheidler, 14, of Millhousen, Indiana, in third. Blanche Krell, 13, of Detroit placed fourth. Aaron Butler Jr. of Weir, Kansas, placed fifth. Butler had dropped out at 15th place but was reinstated after contending he had properly spelled "incroachment". When he was reinstated, only six spellers were left. Dorothy Greenwald placed 17th, but went on to win the following year.

There were 23 contestants this year. Samuel M. North, superintendent of Maryland high schools, served as pronouncer, along with Charles E. Hill of George Washington University.

First prize was $1000, followed by $500 for second, and $250 for third.

The NBC radio network broadcast the final hour of the bee.

Randall was the first Bee winner from Illinois, and alone in that honor until Balu Natarajan won in 1985.
