= 47th Scripps National Spelling Bee =

Spelling bee held in the United States in 1974

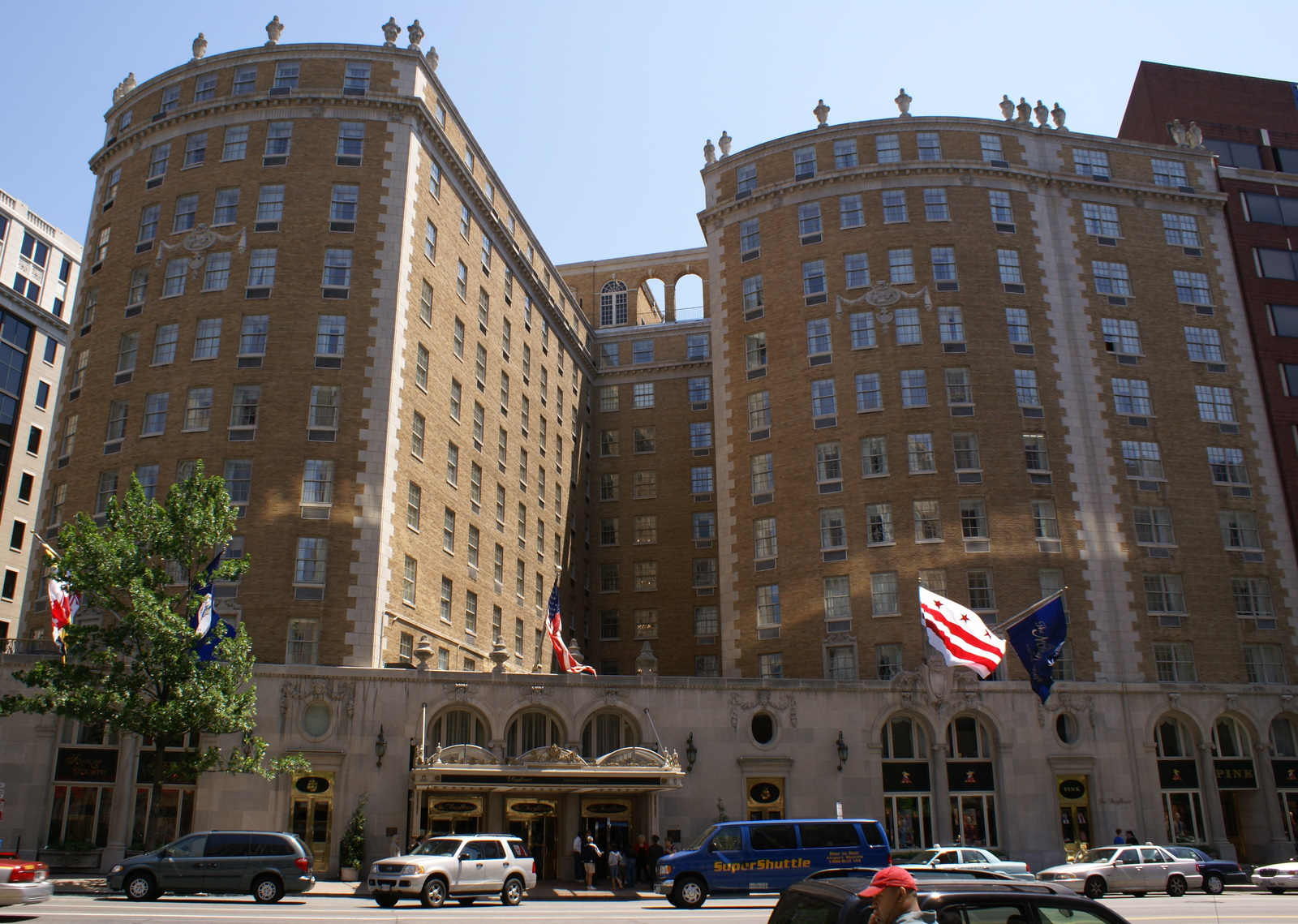
- The Mayflower Hotel, site of the 47th National Spelling Bee
- Date: June 5–6, 1974
- Location: The Mayflower Hotel in Washington, D.C.
- Winner: Julie Ann Junkin (12 at time of win)
- Sponsor: Birmingham Post-Herald
- Sponsor location: Birmingham, Alabama
- Winning word: hydrophyte
- No. of contestants: 80
- Pronouncer: Richard R. Baker

The 47th Scripps National Spelling Bee was held in Washington, D.C. at the Mayflower Hotel on June 5–6, 1974, sponsored by the E.W. Scripps Company.

The winner was 12-year-old Julie Ann Junkin, a sixth-grader from Gordo, Alabama, spelling "hydrophyte". Second place went to 14-year-old Gail Meier of Arlington, Tennessee (sponsored by the Memphis Press-Scimitar), who misspelled "mantelletta".

Junkin was the first sixth-grade contestant to win since John Capehart won in the 1961 competition, and the first winner from Alabama.

There were 80 entrants in that year, sponsored by 76 newspapers. The New York Daily News sent four spellers, and the San Juan Star sent two, one for Puerto Rico and one for the Virgin Islands. The field consisted of 40 girls and 40 boys. 24 were age 14, 40 were age 13, 13 were age 12, and 3 were age 11. There one 5th grader, six 6th graders, 17 in 7th grade, and 56 in 8th grade. The spellers represented 33 states, the District of Columbia, Puerto Rico, and the Virgin Islands. Ohio and Texas each sent eight spellers (the most), and Pennsylvania sent seven. Nine of the spellers were repeat contestants, seven from the prior year, and two from 1972.

The field was reduced by 25 by the end of the first day of competition, where 522 words were used.

A taped version of the finals, hosted by Jean Shepherd, appeared on television on PBS this year (and was done again in 1977).
