= 40th Scripps National Spelling Bee =

Spelling bee held in the United States in 1967

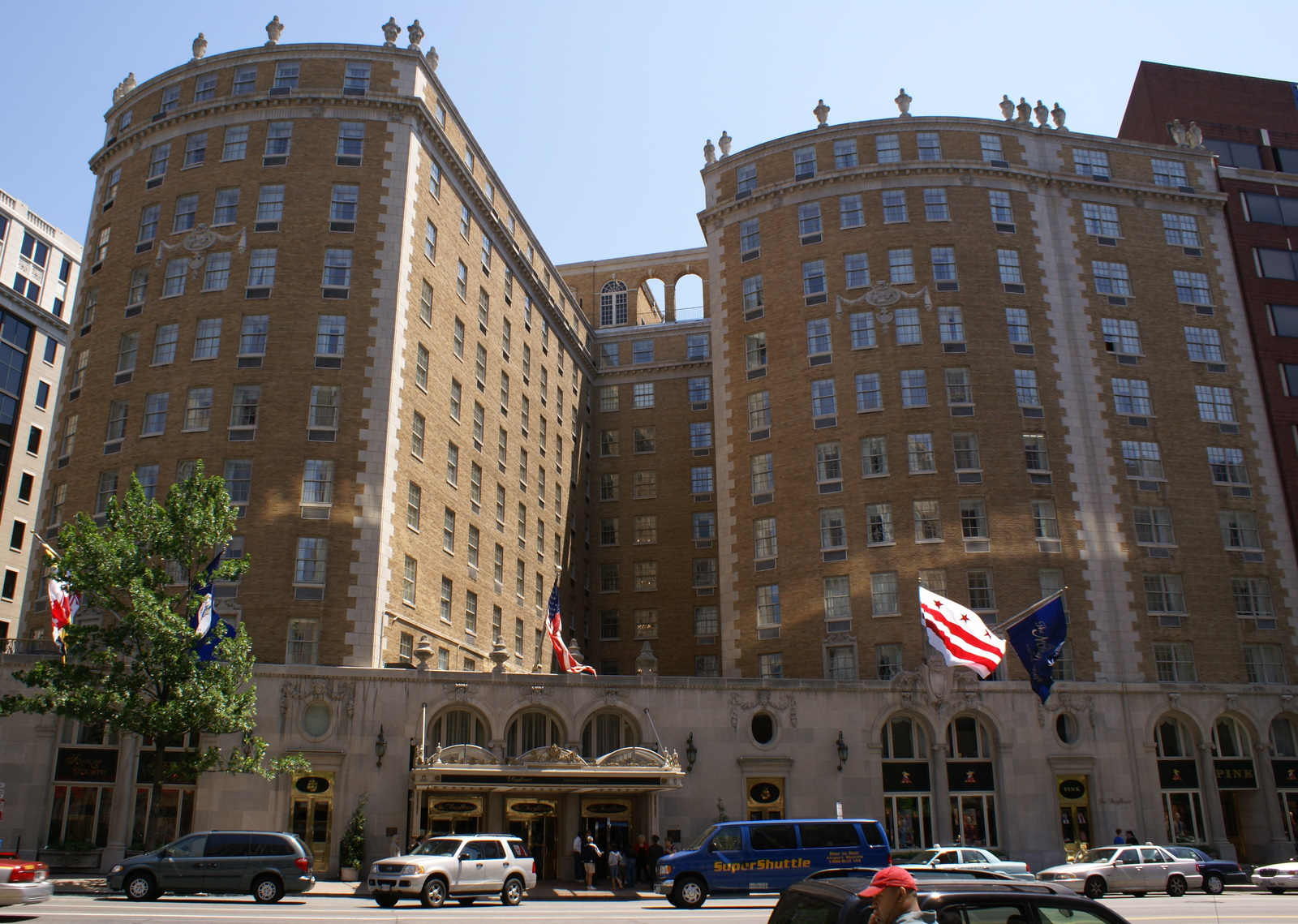
- The Mayflower Hotel, site of the 40th National Spelling Bee
- Date: June 7–8, 1967
- Location: The Mayflower Hotel in Washington, D.C.
- Winner: Jennifer Reinke (14 at time of win)
- Sponsor: Omaha World-Herald
- Sponsor location: Omaha, Nebraska
- Winning word: chihuahua
- No. of contestants: 73
- Pronouncer: Richard R. Baker

The 40th Scripps National Spelling Bee was held in Washington, D.C. at the Mayflower Hotel on June 7–8, 1967, sponsored by the E.W. Scripps Company.

== Winners ==
The winner was 14-year-old Jennifer Reinke of Deshler, Nebraska who correctly spelled "chihuahua" to clinch the win on June 8. Reinke was the first winner from Nebraska since Virginia Hogan won the 5th Bee in 1929. During the contest, she never asked any questions (i.e., to have a word used in a sentence, or for the country of origin or alternate pronunciations) for any of her words. Reinke appeared on The Ed Sullivan Show on June 11.

Anne Clark, 14, of Huntington, West Virginia placed second (falling on "milline" which she spelled as "milign"), followed by 14-year old Milene Henley of Houston, Texas in third.

The words Reinke correctly spelled in the contest were: lily, icy, leisurely, applique, acetate, albino, episcopacy, domiciliary, quisling, cornice, calibrate, antimacassar, hawse, eponym, athodyd, demurrage, encephalitis, mantelletta, cosset, fleche, pogrom, milline, and chihuahua. First Reinke and then Clark failed to correctly spell "spinnaker" near the end of the contest, giving Reinke another chance to win.

The public library in Deshler, Nebraska was rededicated in 2016 as the Jennifer Reinke Public Library. Reinke currently lives in nearby Hebron, Nebraska. Reinke is one of two all-time Bee winners from Nebraska, the first being Virginia Hogan in 1929.

== Competition ==
This year's contest had 73 contestants sponsored by 72 newspapers, a total of 47 girls and 26 boys. Twelve spellers were age 12, 40 were age 13, and 21 were age 14; 58 were in eighth grade, 14 in seventh grade, and one speller was in sixth grade. At the end of the first day of competition, after 432 words were used, the field was reduced to 35.

Although the New York World Journal Tribune folded in early May 1967, it still sponsored two entrants.

First prize was $1000 in addition to a weekend trip to New York City and three-day trip to Expo 67 in Montreal. Second prize was $250, (placeholder. all that was here was the 2nd place prize again), $100 each for fourth through eighth, $75 for 9th–15th, and $50 each for the remaining spellers.
