= L. E. Sissman =

American poet (1928–1976)

- Born: Louis Edward Sissman; January 1, 1928; Detroit, Michigan, U.S.
- Died: March 10, 1976 (aged 48)
- Education: Harvard University
- Occupations: Poet; advertising executive
- Writing career
- Notable awards: Golden Rose Award; National Book Critics Circle Award for Poetry (1978)

Louis Edward Sissman (January 1, 1928, Detroit – March 10, 1976) was an American poet and advertising executive.

== Biography ==
Sissman was raised in Detroit. He went to private schools, and in 1941 he became a national spelling champion when he won the 17th Scripps National Spelling Bee. He was a Quiz Kid.

Near the end of World War II Sissman entered Harvard. He was expelled but returned, graduating in 1949 as Class Poet.

In the 1950s he worked at Prentice-Hall in New York City as a copy editor. In the 1960s he worked at odd jobs, including campaigning for John F. Kennedy. Eventually, he was hired by Quinn and Johnson Advertising, in Boston, and he rose to the position of Creative Vice President. He married Anne, and lived in Still River.

In 1965, he discovered he had Hodgkin lymphoma. He fought the disease for a decade. He wrote book reviews and poems for The New Yorker, monthly columns for The Atlantic, and was published in Harper's Magazine.

His papers are housed at Harvard University.

== Awards ==
- Guggenheim Fellowship, 1968
- Garrison Prize
- Golden Rose Award
- Hello Darkness, won the 1978 National Book Critics Circle Award

== Works ==
- "THE TREE WARDEN". The Atlantic Monthly. June 1965.
- "THE MUSEUM OF COMPARATIVE ZOOLOGY". The Atlantic Monthly. January 1967.
- "LOVE-MAKING; APRIL; MIDDLE AGE". The Atlantic Monthly. January 1968.
- "TRAS OS MONTES". The Atlantic Monthly. May 1978.
- Innocent Bystander: The Scene from the 70's. Vanguard Press. 1975. ISBN 978-0814907696.

=== Poetry books ===
- Dying: An Introduction. Little, Brown. 1968.
- Scattered Returns. Little, Brown and Company. 1969.
- Pursuit of Honor. Little, Brown. 1971.
- Peter Davison, ed. (1978). Hello, Darkness: The Collected Poems of L. E. Sissman. Little, Brown. ISBN 978-0-316-79311-7.
- Peter Davison, ed. (1999). Night music. Houghton Mifflin Harcourt. ISBN 978-0-395-92570-6.

== Reviews ==
The poetry of Louis Edward Sissman speaks to us out of midcentury American life with all of the poise and formal elegance of W. H. Auden yet with the joie de vivre of Sissman's Harvard contemporary Frank O'Hara....The influence of Sissman's poetry has now survived into a second generation. The poet Brad Leithauser, born after Sissman graduated from college, declared in The New Criterion that "[Sissman] can serve as a model to every contemporary poet." And Edward Hirsch, in the foreword to Night Music, states, "He provides an example of wit schooled by feeling and deepened by experience, of intellect coming together with restrained but warm underlying emotion, of poetic freedom enabled by expertise."—P. Davison, The Atlantic, Mar 17, 1999
