= 38th Scripps National Spelling Bee =

Spelling bee held in the United States in 1965

- Date: June 9–10, 1965
- Winner: Michael Kerpan, Jr. (12 at time of win)
- Sponsor: Tulsa Tribune
- Sponsor location: Tulsa, Oklahoma
- Winning word: eczema
- No. of contestants: 70
- Pronouncer: Richard R. Baker

The 38th Scripps National Spelling Bee was held in Washington, D.C., on June 9–10, 1965, sponsored by the E.W. Scripps Company.

70 contestants participated in the competition. 7th grader 12-year old Michael Kerpan, Jr., from Tulsa, Oklahoma, sponsored by the Tulsa Tribune, won the competition by correctly spelling the word "eczema" (also the winning word in 1936) after 17 rounds. Judy Guarr of Topeka, Kansas took second place after misspelling "larghetto" in a long duel. As of 2015, Kerpan is the last of two winners from Oklahoma, the first being John Capehart in the 1961 bee.

Third place was taken by 13-year-old Ralph Moore of Ohio.

There were 70 contestants this year, ranging from 11 to 15 years old, evenly split with 35 boys and 35 girls, from 32 states, the District of Columbia, and Guam. Three finalists returned from the prior year's bee.

Future Federal Reserve Board Chairman Ben Bernanke was eliminated on the word edelweiss, finishing 26th.

The first place prize was $1,000 (along with a trip to New York City to appear on The Ed Sullivan Show and $100 in spending money). A total of $5,700 in prizes were awarded to all spellers.
