= Dominic F. Antonelli Jr. =

Dominic F. Antonelli Jr. (April 8, 1922 – July 19, 2010) was an American businessman who was best known, in Washington, D.C., as a parking lot magnate where he co-founded Parking Management, Inc. (PMI Parking). He regularly dealt in real estate with Kingdon Gould Jr., Ulysses G. "Blackie" Auger, and others. Their holdings included Madison National Bank and the Mayflower Hotel.

For many years Antonelli was a business partner of Gould Jr. in the Washington D.C. parking and real estate development PMI Parking Management Inc. Antonelli's real estate holdings were extensive in Washington D.C.'s suburbs. He also had vast holdings in Panama, where he owned more than half a million acres of land, a coconut-oil refining business, and a Coca-Cola bottling company.

Antonelli was a founding member of the National Italian American Foundation.

Antonelli died on July 19, 2010, at the age of 88.
