= Kingdon Gould III =

American real estate developer

- Born: June 16, 1948 (age 77); New Haven, Connecticut, U.S.
- Occupation: Real estate developer
- Spouse: Kristin Gould

Kingdon Gould III (born June 16, 1948) is an American real estate developer, active in the Washington, D.C.-area. He is part of the fifth generation of the Gould family of financiers, philanthropists and diplomats, which includes his father Kingdon Gould, Jr., grandfather Kingdon Gould Sr., great-grandfather George Jay Gould and great-great-grandfather Jay Gould, with associated generations of mothers, siblings, uncles, aunts and cousins.

== Life and career ==
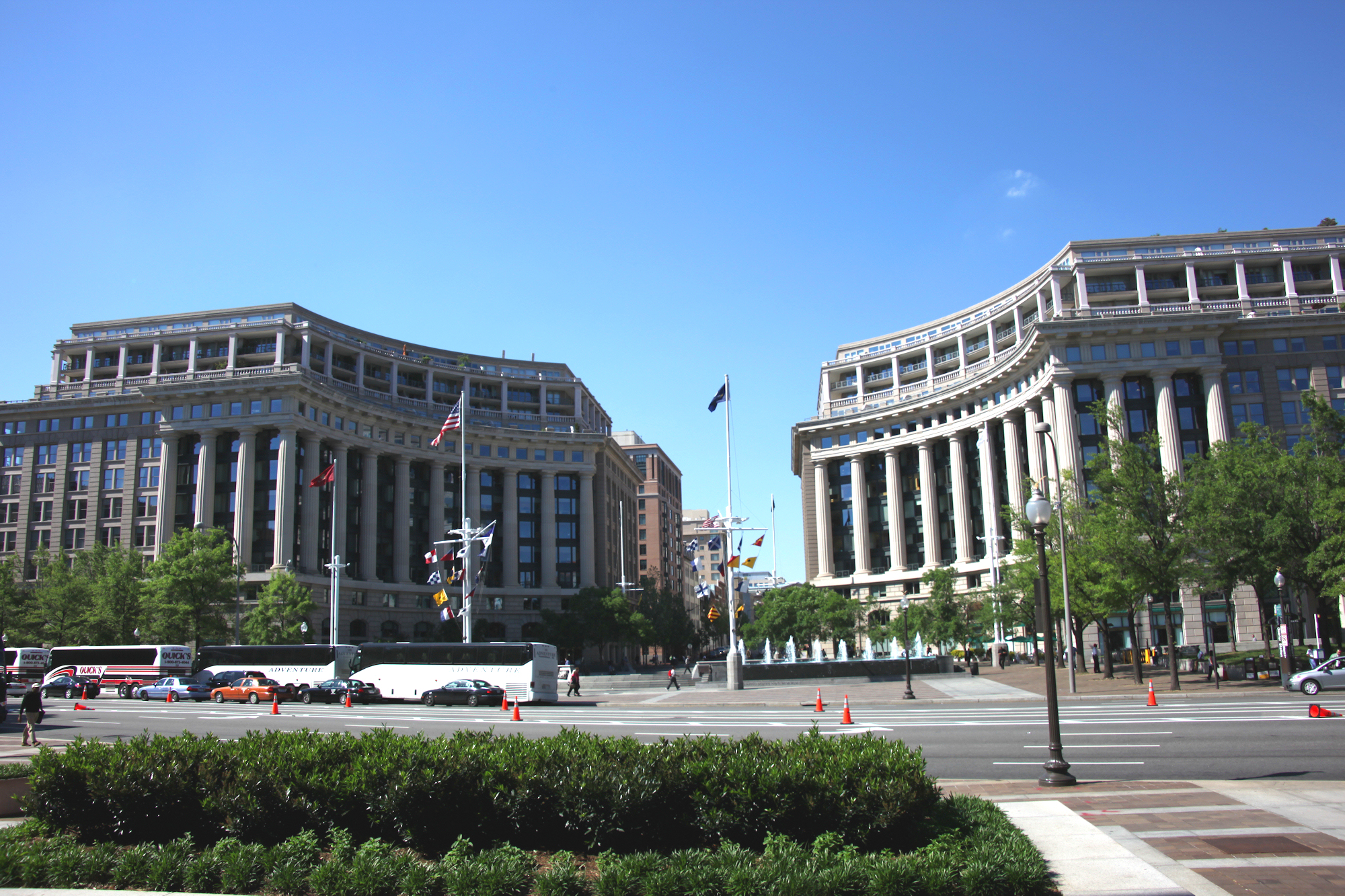
Market Square, which was developed by Kingdon Gould III and Boston Properties.

He was born in New Haven, Connecticut, on June 16, 1948, to Kingdon Gould, Jr., and his wife, Mary Bunce Gould (née Thorne).

He was made part owner and vice president of Gould Property Company, his father's real estate firm and one of the largest and oldest real estate development firms in the D.C. metropolitan area. He was the company's spokesperson when the Hyatt Regency Crystal City hotel and the Mayflower Hotel both were subject to foreclosure proceedings in 1989.

=== Other notable projects ===
In 1990, Gould partnered with Boston Properties to construct Market Square North, a development in the Pennsylvania Avenue National Historic Site which was completed in 1997.

In 1996, Gould's Laurel Sand and Gravel company, which includes Fairfax Materials, Allegany Aggregates, Laurel Asphalt and S.W. Barrick & Sons, purchased the 600 acres chase property north of the historic town of Savage, Maryland. The site is home to the Savage Stone quarry, mining Baltimore Gabbro for road bed construction. The facility started operations in 2005 after special zoning approval with a 25-year reserve in materials.

Gould then partnered with his brother, Caleb Gould, and local developers David Costello and Richard B. Talkin to form Kincade LLC. In September 2000, Kincade broke ground on the $11 million Columbia Lakeside, a six-story, 75,000 square feet (7,000 m^{2}) office building facing Lake Kittamaqundi. It was the first new office building in Columbia Town Center since 1998.

In 2001, Gould embarked on a six-year-long land swap deal with the District of Columbia. Gould owned a 1.5 acres (0.61 ha) lot on the southeast corner of 9th Street NW and Massachusetts Avenue NW. Gould joined with Marriott International, a hotel company, to propose that a 1,500-room hotel be built on this site to function as a "headquarters hotel" for the Walter E. Washington Convention Center (then under construction). Gould hired the law firm of Robins, Kaplan, Miller & Ciresi to assist with his plans. There was extensive debate among city officials and developers over whether the Gould parcel was too small for the hotel, and whether the old Washington Convention Center site (a few blocks away) would be more appropriate. D.C. Mayor Anthony A. Williams appointed Gould to an advisory board in October 2004, and charged the advisory board with studying all proposed sites and recommending one for the hotel to the city. In August 2005, the Washington Convention and Sports Authority put a $900,000 down payment on two lots (which included the historic former headquarters of the United Association of Journeymen and Apprentices of the Plumbing and Pipe Fitting Industry adjacent to the Gould parcel. On January 26, 2005, Gould swapped his parcel on 9th Street NW for a similar-sized lot at the site of the old convention center. With the land swap, the city was able to move ahead with plans to build the Washington Marriott Marquis, the 1,430-room "headquarters hotel" long-desired by the city. On November 1, 2007, the deal to swap land with Gould was finally approved. Although the City Council had signed off on the deal in June 2005, the city took another 25 months to change local zoning regulations so that Gould was exempted from building housing on his new site. Gould said he still had not decided what should be built there.

In 2003, Gould partnered with local residents in Baltimore to purchased the MacGillivray building at Charles and Read Streets to keep it out of the hands of a competing developer. Gould and the others hoped to renovate the structure into a mixed-used apartment building with upscale retail space on the ground floor.

In April 2007, Gould proposed a major redevelopment of an area bounded by Massachusetts Avenue NW, I Street NW, 6th Street NW, and 7th Street NW (a trapezoidal city block just southeast of Mount Vernon Square). Although 650 Massachusetts Avenue NW and 901 Seventh Street NW were modern office buildings on the western end of the parcel, surface parking lots and several historic townhouses facing I Street NW occupied the remainder of the block. Gould proposed construction of an 11-story, 360,000-square-foot (33,000 m^{2}) office building with retail space on the ground floor and 300 underground parking spaces on the area currently occupied by the parking lots and townhouses. The office building's facade would be decorated with Chinese motifs, in keeping with the nature of the nearby Chinatown neighborhood. He proposed moving 621 I Street NW and 623 I Street NW (both constructed in 1852 and never renovated) to form a cluster with three other historic townhouses on the southeast corner of the parcel, and demolishing 627 I Street NW (which had been renovated as recently as 1946 and was no longer considered to have retained its historic character). The District of Columbia Historic Preservation Review Board began reviewing his proposal.

Gould took several steps to help win local support for his proposal. He worked with the Chinatown Steering Committee and the Chinatown Revitalization Council, and offered to contribute $1 million toward the construction of affordable housing in Chinatown, to turn over 13,000 square feet (1,200 m^{2}) of space in the new building for community use, contribute $100,000 to neighborhood programs, and give free parking space in his building to members of both groups. However, Gould also proposed closing part of the alley serving the block. Steering committee members opposed this, because the closed area would be behind their condominium homes and they feared an increase in crime. D.C. Council Chairman Vincent C. Gray attempted to mediate the dispute. Gould abandoned these negotiations, and his architects redesigned the office building to build a service area by reducing the community space to just 4,100 square feet (380 m^{2}). He also limited the space's use to a handful of groups he approved of. Gould also altered his community contribution plan, agreeing to donate $600,000 to the Chinese Community Church, provide rental discounts to Asian-owned retailers in the new building, and donate $850,000 to build affordable housing in Adams Morgan (a D.C. neighborhood several miles from Chinatown). Despite strong objections from the two Chinatown community groups, the D.C. City Council approved Gould's proposal by a 12-to-1 vote in August 2007.

=== Local roles ===
In the mid-1990s, Gould was elected president of the Penn Quarter Neighborhood Association, a position he continued to hold as late as 2002.

Gould was also chairman of the Downtown Business Improvement District in Washington, D.C.

== Bibliography ==
- Gutheim, Frederick A. and Lee, Antoinette J. Worthy of the Nation: Washington, D.C., From L'Enfant to the National Capital Planning Commission. 2d ed. Baltimore, Md.: Johns Hopkins University Press, 2006.
- Harnik, Peter. Urban Green: Innovative Parks for Resurgent Cities. Washington, D.C.: Island Press, 2010.
