= 8th Scripps National Spelling Bee =

Spelling bee held in the United States in 1932

8th National Spelling Bee
- Date: June 7, 1932
- Location: National Museum in Washington, D.C.
- Winner: Dorothy Greenwald (13 at time of win)
- Sponsor: The Des Moines Register and Tribune
- Sponsor location: Des Moines, Iowa
- Winning word: invulnerable
- No. of contestants: 19
- Pronouncer: Charles E. Hill and Robert L. Haycock

The 8th National Spelling Bee was held at the National Museum in Washington, D.C. on June 7, 1932, sponsored by the Louisville Courier-Journal. Scripps-Howard would not sponsor the Bee until 1941.

The winner was 13-year-old Dorothy Greenwald, of Muscatine, Iowa, with the word "invulnerable". Greenwald was a return contestant who had placed 17th the prior year.

Kenneth Cecil of Kentucky took second place, falling on "interchangeably", followed by Wilma Pyle of Detroit.

Nineteen contestants competed this year, and 667 words were used. Charles E. Hill, dean of George Washington University, and Robert L. Haycock, assistant superintendent for public schools in Washington, served as pronouncers, alternating for thirty-minute shifts.

The last hour of the contest was broadcast by radio.

The prize for first place was $1000, followed by $500 for second place, and $250 for third; the following year the effects of the Great Depression led to the grand prize being cut in half.

Greenwald (married name Schultz) graduated from Muscatine High School in 1936 and attended Muscatine Junior College for a time. She died in Muscatine on September 2, 2008.
