= 34th Scripps National Spelling Bee =

1961 American competition

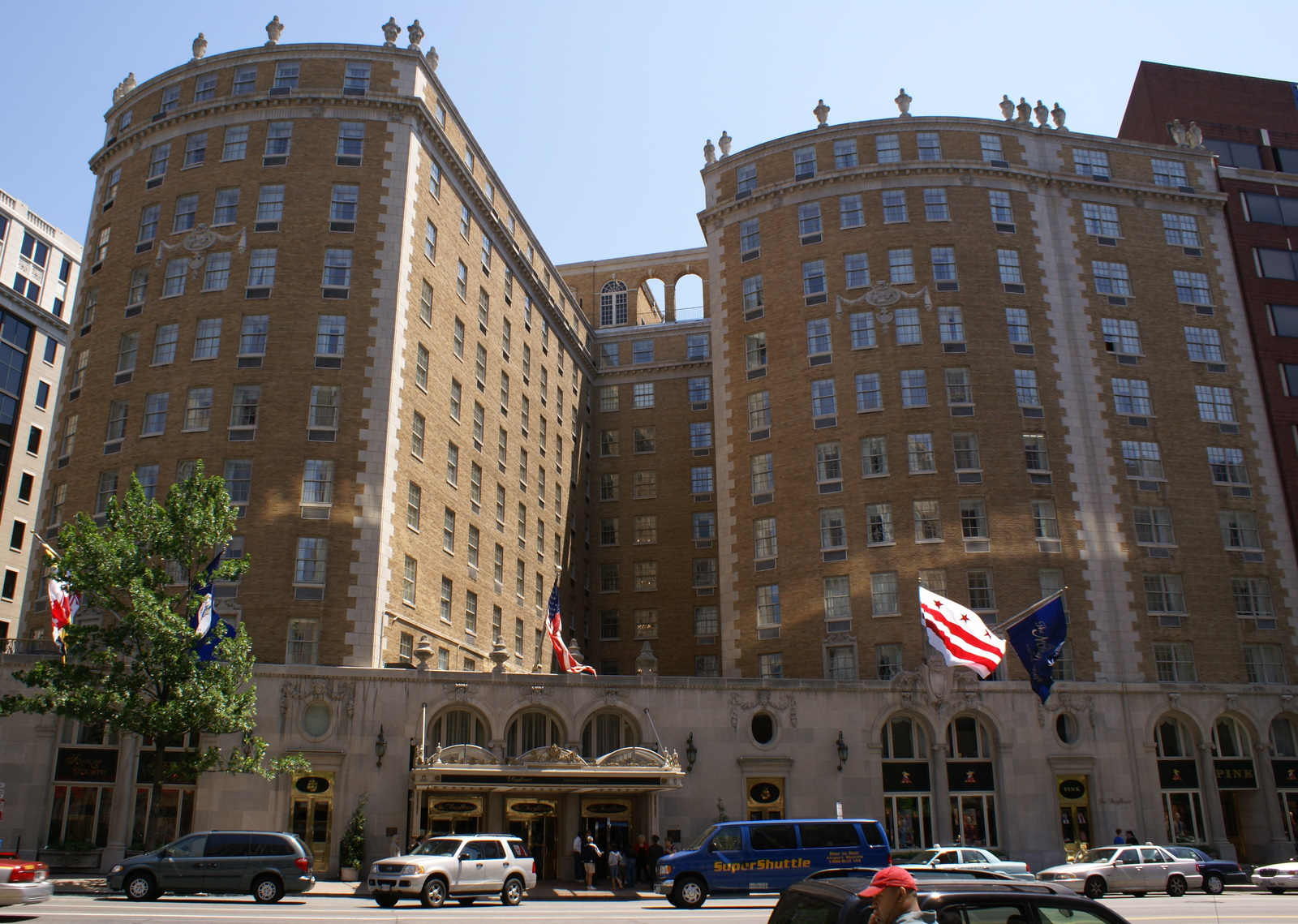
- The Mayflower Hotel, site of the 34th National Spelling Bee
- Date: May 31 – June 1, 1961
- Location: The Mayflower Hotel in Washington, D.C.
- Winner: John Capehart (12 at time of win)
- Sponsor: Tulsa Tribune
- Sponsor location: Tulsa, Oklahoma
- Winning word: smaragdine
- No. of contestants: 73
- Pronouncer: Richard R. Baker (first year as chief pronouncer)

The 34th Scripps National Spelling Bee was held in Washington, District of Columbia on May 31 and June 1, 1961, by the E.W. Scripps Company.

The winner was 12-year-old John Capehart of Tulsa, Oklahoma, correctly spelling the word smaragdine. Mary Lukes (also age 12) of Oxnard, California placed second, failing to correctly spell distichous. Karen Grimm (age 13) of Reistertown, Maryland finished third (after having finished 39th the prior year).

Capehart was the 13th boy to win the competition since 1925, and the first winner from Oklahoma. His other brother Mark had finished 12th in the 1958 bee. As of 2018, the only other Oklahoma winner was Michael Kerpan Jr. in 1965.

There were 73 spellers this year, 24 boys and 49 girls. The competition began at 8:30am on Wednesday, May 31, in the ballroom of the Mayflower Hotel. Fifty-six were eliminated in the first day of competition, leaving 17 to move into day two (12 girls and 5 boys). The winner received $1000, with $500 for second, and $250 to third. The last 55 finalists all received $50.

This was the first year that Richard Baker served as pronouncer, succeeding the late Benson S. Alleman, who had done the job for 13 years.
