= 79th Scripps National Spelling Bee =

Spelling bee held in the United States in 2006

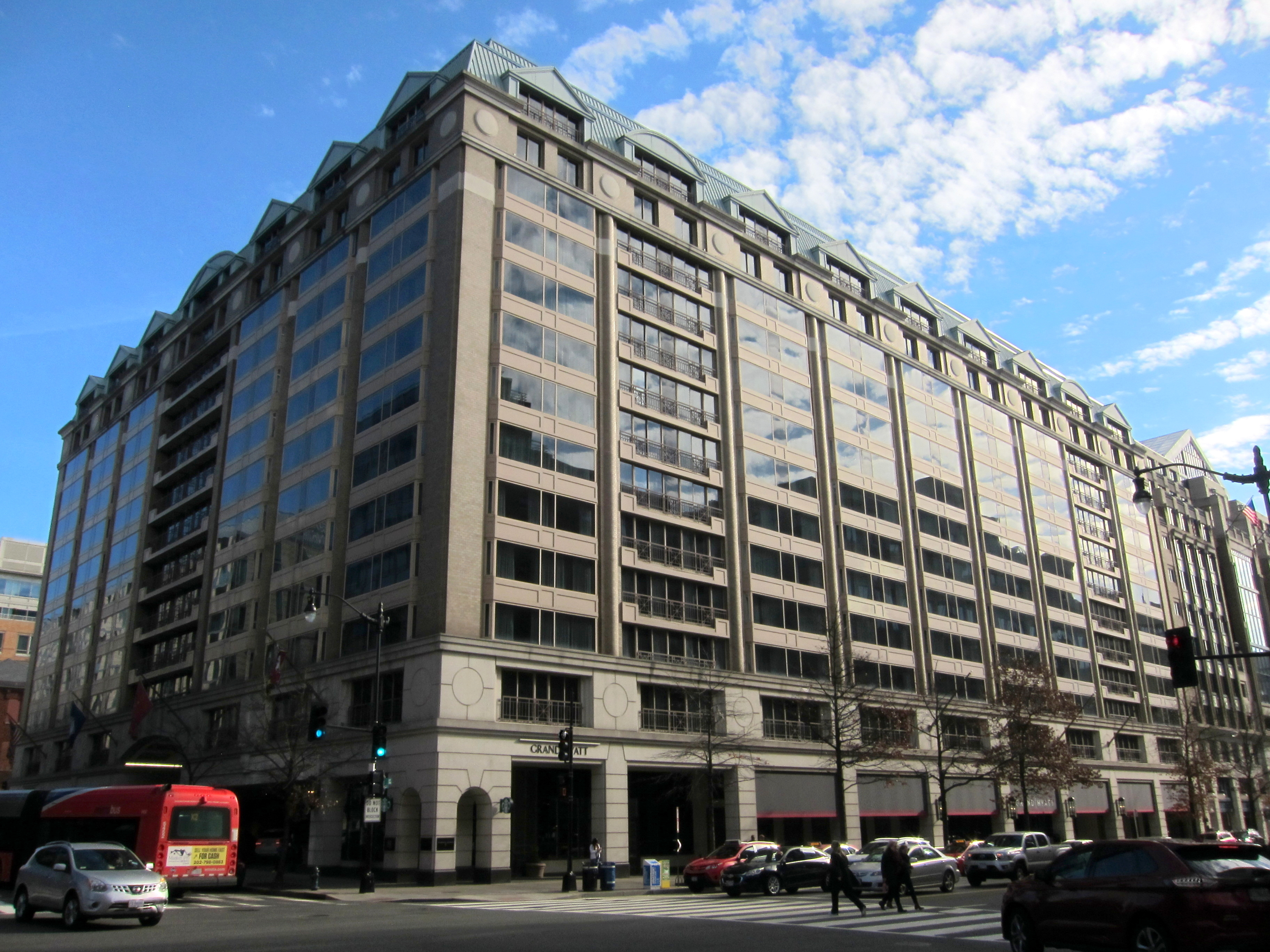
- The Grand Hyatt Washington in Washington, D.C., hosted the Scripps National Spelling Bee.
- Date: May 31 – June 1, 2006
- Location: Grand Hyatt Washington,Washington, D.C.
- Winner: Katharine "Kerry" Close (13 at time of win)
- Sponsor: Asbury Park Press / Home News Tribune
- Winning word: Ursprache
- No. of contestants: 275
- Pronouncer: Jacques Bailly

The 79th Scripps National Spelling Bee was held in Washington, D.C., on May 31 and June 1, 2006. For the first time in the Bee's history, ABC broadcast the Championship Rounds on primetime television.

A thirteen-year-old eighth-grader from Spring Lake, New Jersey, Katharine "Kerry" Close, won the Bee on her fifth attempt, correctly spelling Ursprache in the twentieth round. She was the first female champion since 1999. Fourteen-year-old Finola Hackett of Canada placed second after misspelling weltschmerz, and third place fell to Saryn Hooks, a 14-year-old from Taylorsville, North Carolina, who misspelled "icteritious". Close was the first winner from New Jersey since the 1971 bee.

The 275 spellers (139 boys and 136 girls) participated in the competition. This Bee was also remarkable because an extremely rare error had made its way into the judges' word lists. This Round 8 error, had it not been found and reported quickly, would have resulted in the erroneous elimination of Saryn Hooks, who correctly spelled the Hebrew-derived word hechsher, meaning a rabbinical endorsement of food. The judges' word list, however, listed the word as "hechscher". The error was first caught by Lucas Brown, who then promptly notified the judges. Saryn Hooks was reinstated and went on to take third place.

ESPN, which had televised the final rounds of the bee in their entirety since 1994, aired the Preliminary Championship Rounds. (CNN televised the final rounds from 1991 to 1993.) ESPN SportsCenter anchor Chris McKendry hosted the ESPN broadcast and ABC Good Morning America anchor Robin Roberts hosted the ABC broadcast, with former finalist Paul Loeffler serving as the analyst for both broadcasts, and Chris Connelly filling the sideline reporter role. Both ESPN and ABC broadcast the event in high-definition.

== See also ==
- List of Scripps National Spelling Bee champions
