= 9th Scripps National Spelling Bee =

Spelling bee held in the United States in 1933

9th National Spelling Bee
- Date: May 30, 1933
- Location: National Museum in Washington, D.C.
- Winner: Alma Roach (12 at time of win)
- Sponsor: Akron Beacon Journal
- Sponsor location: Akron, Ohio
- Winning word: torsion
- No. of contestants: 16
- Pronouncer: Charles E. Hill and H.E. Warner

The 9th National Spelling Bee was held in Washington, D.C., on May 30, 1933, organized by the Louisville Courier-Journal. Scripps-Howard would not sponsor the Bee until 1941.

The winner was 12-year-old Alma Roach of Twinsburg, Ohio, sponsored by the Akron Beacon Journal, correctly spelling the word torsion. George Meltzer (age 14) of New Jersey placed second (missing propitiatory), followed by 13-year-old Virginia Wood in third (missing holocaust).

Roach won $500 for first place (a drop from the usual $1000), followed by $300 for second, and $100 for third.

The event was broadcast on radio.

Roach (married name Mercer) became a teacher, retiring from Solon Middle School in her hometown of Twinsburg in 1983. She died at Akron General Hospital on July 31, 2003.
