= 3rd Scripps National Spelling Bee =

Spelling bee held in the United States in 1927

3rd National Spelling Bee
- Date: June 23, 1927
- Location: National Museum, Washington, D.C.
- Winner: Dean Lucas (13 at time of win)
- Sponsor: Akron Beacon Journal
- Sponsor location: Akron, Ohio
- Winning word: abrogate
- No. of contestants: 17
- Pronouncer: George S. Wills

The 3rd National Spelling Bee was held at the National Museum in Washington, D.C., on June 23, 1927. It was hosted by the Louisville Courier-Journal; Scripps-Howard would not sponsor the Bee until 1941.

There were 17 contestants, 13 girls and 4 boys, between the ages of 10 and 15. The event lasted three hours. The first-place prize was $1000, with $500 for second place, and $250 for third.

The winner was 13-year-old Dean Lucas of West Salem, Ohio (some sources say nearby Congress, Ohio, where he attended school), with the word abrogate. It was his second appearance at the Bee. Ralph Keenan, 13, of Waukon, Iowa, placed second (misspelling "abrogate" as "abregate"); Minerva Ressler, 12, of Lancaster, Pennsylvania,was third.
