= 21st Scripps National Spelling Bee =

Spelling bee held in the United States in 1948

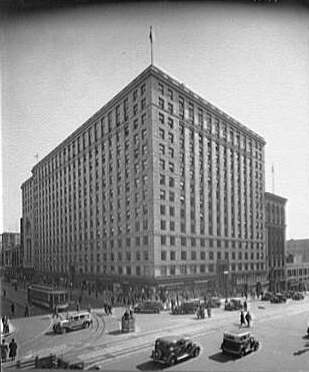
- National Press Building
- Date: May 28, 1948
- Location: Auditorium of the National Press Building, Washington, D.C.
- Winner: Jean Chappelear (14 at time of win)
- Sponsor: Akron Beacon Journal
- Sponsor location: Akron, Ohio
- Winning word: psychiatry
- No. of contestants: 40
- Pronouncer: Benson S. Alleman

The 21st Scripps National Spelling Bee was hosted in Washington, District of Columbia, on May 28, 1948, by the E.W. Scripps Company. The winner was 14-year-old Jean Chappelear of Ohio, who correctly spelled the word psychiatry.

Second place went to 14-year-old Darrell Flavelle of Washington, D.C., who misspelled "oligarchy", followed by Rosemary Schirmer of White Oak, Ohio who took third after missing "ecclesiastical". Both Chappellear and Flavelle missed "poncho" and "termagant" before the end. Chappellear held a "lucky penny" throughout the contest.

There were 40 contestants ages 11–14, and it ran longer than any prior bees, with a total of 593 words used.

Chappelear was the fourth Akron, Ohio–based speller to win the Bee. Jean Ann (Chappelear) Schlupe died in Ohio on February 23, 2021.
