= Charles E. Hill =

American political scientist (1881–1936)

- Born: Charles Edward Hill; September 27, 1881; Rochelle, Illinois, U.S.
- Died: May 10, 1936 (aged 54); Washington, D.C., U.S.
- Resting place: Rock Creek Cemetery

Academic background
- Education: University of Michigan; Harvard University

Academic work
- Discipline: Political Science
- Sub-discipline: International Law
- Institutions: George Washington University

Charles Edward Hill (September 27, 1881 – May 10, 1936) was an American professor of political science at George Washington University. He was a leading expert on international law, particularly when it came to issues involving confined bodies of water.

== Early life ==
Hill was born in Rochelle, Illinois in 1881. His parents are Engeborg Hoversten and Peter K. Hill. When he was three years old, his family moved to a farm near Williams, Iowa where Hill spent his childhood.

He attended the Jewell Lutheran College preparatory school in Iowa; he paid his tuition by trapping muskrats and teaching in county schools. He enrolled in the University of Michigan, graduating with an A.B. in 1906 and an A.M. in 1907. Then, he attended Harvard University, receiving a Ph.D. in 1916.

== Career ==
After graduating from the University of Michigan, Hill taught at the Kansas State Normal School from 1907 and 1913. From 1913 to 1914, he was the supervising principal of the public schools of Pasadena, California.

In 1916, he became an assistant professor of political science at George Washington University. In 1918, he became head of political science. He was the dean of Columbian College from 1926 to 1931. Starting in 1929, he lectured at the postgraduate school at the United States Naval Academy. He taught during the summer session at the Illinois Normal University in 1911, the University of Southern California in 1930, and the University of Washington in 1935.

Hill became a noted expert in international law. He specialized in laws relating to narrow bodies of water, including channels, rivers, semi-inland seas, and straights. He presented at least six lectures at The Hague Academy of International Law which were published in 1933. He also served as a special expert for the United States Tariff Commission from 1916 to 1917 and traveled abroad with Carnegie's party of professors. He served on the commission to revise the laws of the House of Representatives in 1920.

His publications include Leading American Treaties, The Danish Sound Dues and the Command of the Baltic, and the James Madison portion of The American Secretaries of State and Their Diplomacy (1928). He also wrote a publication on teaching international law for the American Society of International Law.

== Professional affiliations ==
Hill was a fellow of Royal Historical Society. He was a member of the American Association of University Professors, the American Political Science Association, and the American Society of International Law. He was also an associate member of the United States Naval Institute.

== Publications ==
- Leading American Treaties. New York: The Macmillan Company, 1922
- The Danish Sound Dues and the Command of the Baltic: A Study of International Relations. Durham: Duke University Press, 1926.
- "James Madison Secretary of State March 05, 1801, to March 3, 1809" in The American Secretaries of State And Their Diplomacy, Volume 3. Samuel Flagg Bemis, ed. New York: Cooper Square Publishers, 1928.
- "Le Regime International des Detroits Maritime (The International Regime of Maritime Straits)" Collected Courses of the Hague Academy of International Law, volume 45, 1933.

== Personal life ==
Hill married Jane Blair on September 1, 1911. They had four children: Jane (1912), Anne (1916), Mary (1919), and Caroline (1925). They lived at 2033 G. Street in Washington, D.C. Later, he lived at 1303 Floral Street.

He was a member of the Cosmos Club and the Harvard Club of Washington, D.C. He was a Presbyterian. He also served as a pronouncer for the National Spelling Bee in 1934.

In 1936, he died at age 54 after a mastoid operation in Washington, D.C. He was buried at Rock Creek Cemetery.
