= Mayflower Hotel =

Hotel in Washington, D.C.

The Mayflower Hotel
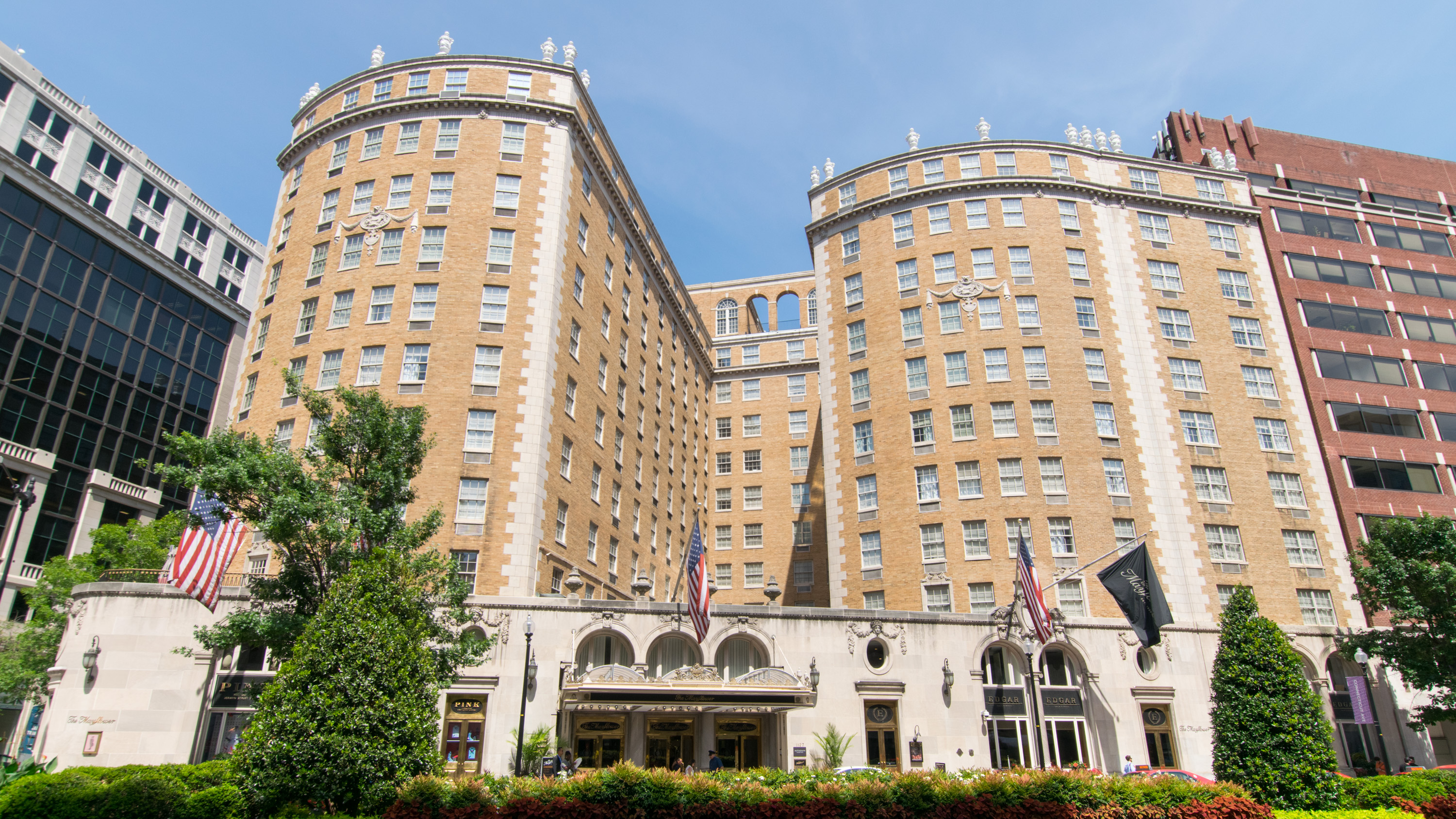
- The Mayflower Hotel in 2017
- Interactive map of the The Mayflower Hotel area

General information
- Location: 1127 Connecticut Avenue NW, Washington, D.C., U.S.
- Opening: February 18, 1925; 101 years ago
- Owner: Apollo Commercial Real Estate Finance Inc.
- Operator: Autograph Collection Hotels

Technical details
- Floor count: 10

Design and construction
- Architects: Warren & Wetmore; Robert F. Beresford
- Developer: Allen E. Walker

Other information
- Number of rooms: 512
- Number of suites: 69 (includes two presidential suites)
- Number of restaurants: 1

Website
- The Mayflower Hotel
- Mayflower Hotel
- U.S. National Register of Historic Places
- Location within Central Washington, D.C. Location within the District of Columbia Location within the United States
- Coordinates: 38°54′15.85″N 77°2′23.29″W
- Architectural style: Beaux-Arts
- NRHP reference No.: 83003527
- Added to NRHP: November 14, 1983

The Mayflower Hotel is a historic hotel in downtown Washington, D.C., located on Connecticut Avenue NW. It is two blocks north of Farragut Square and one block north of the Farragut North Metro station. The hotel is managed by Autograph Collection Hotels, a division of Marriott International. It is charter member of Historic Hotels of America, the official program of the National Trust for Historic Preservation.

The Mayflower is the largest luxury hotel in Washington, D.C., the longest continuously operating hotel in the Washington metropolitan area, and a rival of the nearby Willard InterContinental Washington and Hay–Adams Hotels.

The Mayflower has been called the "Grande Dame of Washington" and the "Hotel of Presidents", President Harry S. Truman, a frequent guest of the hotel, called the Mayflower Hotel the city's "Second Best Address" after the White House. It ranked a four-star hotel.

== History ==
=== Construction, sale, and renaming ===
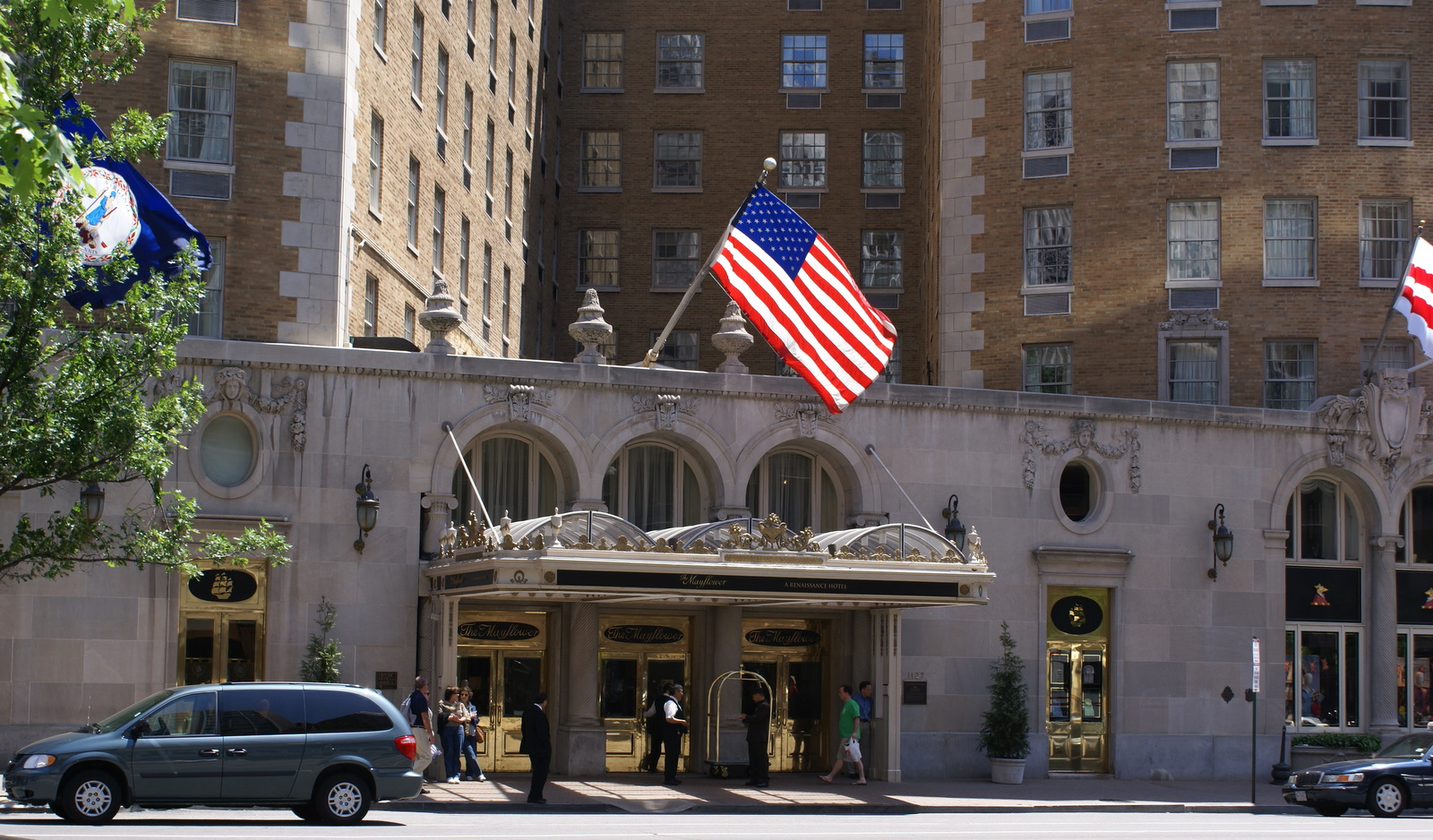
Front entrance to Mayflower Hotel

The site on which the Mayflower Hotel sits was, after the organization of the District of Columbia in 1792, initially owned by the federal government, which finally sold the property to Nathaniel Carusi for $5,089. Carusi, in turn, sold the site to the Order of the Visitation of Holy Mary in 1867 for $50,000. (Note: The Order of the Visitation was founded in 1610 by Saint Francis de Sales and Saint Jane Frances de Chantal. DeSales Street takes its name from the Order's founder.) The order built the Convent of the Visitation on the site, a structure that occupied the land until the construction of the Mayflower Hotel itself.

The Mayflower Hotel was built by Allan E. Walker, the land developer behind Brookland and other residential neighborhoods of Washington. Initially called the Hotel Walker, it was to have 11 stories, 1,100 rooms, and cost $6.2 million ($119,254,473 in 2025 dollars). On May 27, 1922, the Walker Hotel Company was organized, with Allan Walker as president. The corporation issued 80,000 shares of preferred stock worth $2 million and 80,000 shares of common stock, and purchased a site on the north half of the block on DeSales Street between 17th Street and Connecticut Avenue. Plans for the hotel, whose cost was now pegged at $6.75 million ($129,833,499 in 2025 dollars), now included an 11-story, 1,100-room hotel facing Connecticut Avenue, whose first two floors would be common rooms, and an eight-story residential hotel facing 17th Street. Robert F. Beresford of Washington, D.C., and the New York City architectural firm of Warren and Wetmore were appointed the architects, and Beresford said the structure would be built of concrete and brick around a steel frame. Indiana limestone would be used for the facade on the first three floors, with rusticated brick and terra cotta trim on all upper floors. By June 6, however, the cost of the hotel had risen to $8 million ($146,869,070 in 2025 dollars), largely due to a sizeable expansion in the size of the ballrooms (the largest of which could now seat 1,600 people), meeting rooms, and other public spaces on the first two floors and first basement level.

Ground for the new hotel was broken in July 1922. Structural engineer F. E. Gillen designed the foundation, and oversaw its construction. As excavation began, workers quickly uncovered the stumps of massive cypress trees, some of the trunks nearly 8 feet (2.4 m) in diameter. Geologists estimated the stumps at 100,000 years old. As workers dug deeper, they discovered that an underground branch of Rock Creek ran below the site. This forced the foundation to be dug to bedrock, some 40 feet (12 m) below ground. The facade along Connecticut Avenue was 153 feet (47 m) in length, along DeSales Street 455 feet (139 m) in length, and along 17th Street 140 feet (43 m) in length. The main promenade running through the center of the hotel was 24 feet (7.3 m) wide and 400 feet (120 m) long, while the lobby was 59 feet (18 m) wide and 115 feet (35 m) long. Wainscoting and floors in the public rooms of the hotel were of Botticino marble and featured walnut moldings. A glass dome covered the Palm Court, which as decorated on the interior with ornamental ironwork in the Italianate style.

Excavation of the foundation was completed in late November 1922, several weeks ahead of schedule. Steel for the frame began arriving the week of January 21, 1923, and erection of the building's frame was expected to take 10 weeks. More than 500 men worked on erecting the frame, while 2,000 men erected the facade and interior walls, and worked laying electrical, water, sewer, and gas lines. Longacre Engineering Company of New York was the general contractor. Construction costs continued to rise, however. Although scheduled to open January 1, 1924, the hotel remained unfinished. The Allan E. Walker Investment Company, the largest shareholder in the Hotel Walker Company began running short of funds, slowing construction. Nearing bankruptcy, the Walker Investment sold its interest in the Hotel Walker to C.C. Mitchell & Company, builder of large apartment complexes and hotels in Boston and Detroit. The reported price of the sale was $5.7 million for the $8.5 million hotel. But in fact, costs had risen much higher, and the hotel's final cost was closer to $11 million ($201,944,972 in 2025 dollars). The new owners changed the name to the Mayflower Hotel in honor of the 300th anniversary of the landing of the Mayflower and the Pilgrims at Plymouth Rock.

=== About the hotel ===
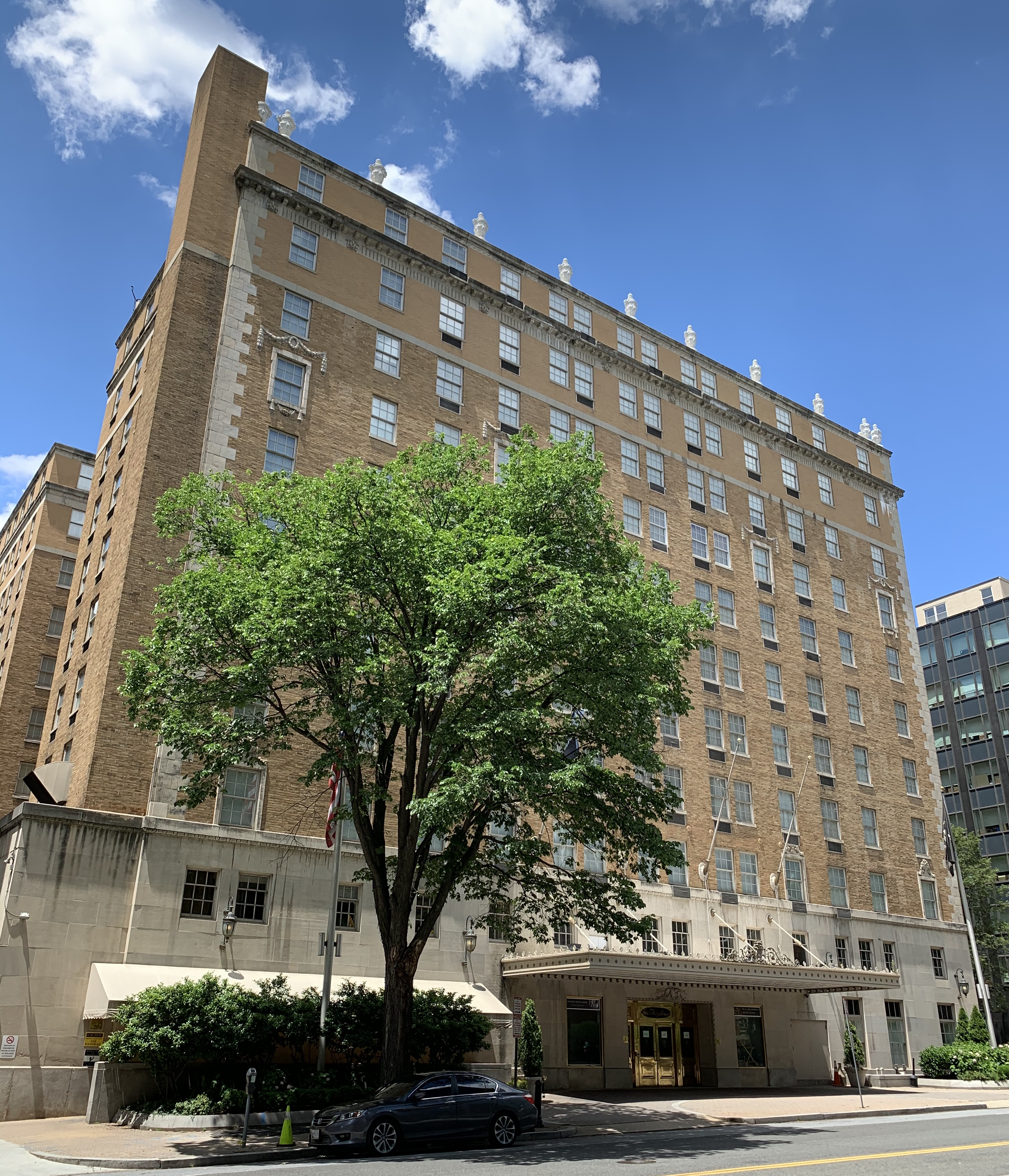
The 17th Street NW rear entrance to the hotel, showing the top 2 floors added to that wing in 1981

The Mayflower Hotel opened on February 18, 1925. (Note: Allan E. Walker died on May 14, 1925, just three months after his grand hotel opened.) The hotel sat on 1.5 acres (6,100 m^{2}) of land, and had roughly 100,000 square feet (9,300 m^{2}) of interior space. Several heating oil furnaces and one of the world's largest air conditioning units kept the hotel at an even 70 °F (21 °C) year round. (Note: The air conditioning was an ice maker, which generated hundreds of pounds of ice every day. Air was blown over the ice to cool it, and the cold air pumped throughout the hotel.) The hotel's promenade, as completed, was 26 feet (7.9 m) wide and 300 feet (91 m) long. (Note: The Washington Post reported on March 4, 1925, that the promenade was 500 feet (150 m) long. But the hotel floor plan, reprinted by McClinsey, shows a promenade only about 300 feet (91 m) long. This latter number is used in this article.)

The hotel had 440 guest rooms, each with its own shower bath. Guest suites had a sitting room, dining room, bath, and up to seven bedrooms. The hotel's 500 residential guest apartments each had its own kitchenette, dining room, and drawing room with fireplace. Some had as many as 11 rooms, and up to five baths.

The cruciform lobby had a mezzanine on the north, west, and south sides, and marble-clad piers divided the north and south walls into three bays. A small cocktail lounge was located along the north wall, while the reception desk occupied the south wall. The lobby received light from a coffered skylight. Four great bronze torchères, hand-wrought and trimmed with gold, dominated the lobby (and were claimed by the hotel to be "priceless"). The main lobby entrance on Connecticut Avenue had a stairway that led down to the first below-ground level, where public restrooms, the barber shop, and a shoeshine stand (made of marble) were located. A secondary corridor and steps behind the elevators led to the Presidential Room; another secondary corridor to the east of the front desk led to the Mayflower Coffee Shop. The four elevators to the east of the lobby, joining it to the Promenade, had bronze doors with images of the Mayflower vessel on them.

The Mayflower featured three restaurants. The 66 by 76 feet (20 by 23 m) Palm Court featured a glass dome supported by iron latticework, numerous palm trees, and a marble fountain and pool with water lilies growing in it. The 50 by 169 feet (15 by 52 m) Presidential Restaurant was decorated with the seals of the Thirteen Colonies. Both were located on the main floor. The Garden Terrace was located on the first below-ground floor. The Italianate style room featured a coffered ceiling done in copper, a marble fountain, plaster walls in warm pastel tints, alcoves designed to look like arbors, and murals of early Washington, D.C., and nearby Mount Vernon. Two well-known hoteliers managed the restaurants: Jules Venice, the maitre d'hotel, and Sabatini, former chef at Delmonico's.

The hotel's Grand Ballroom featured a stage with proscenium, beneath which was a hidden thrust stage that could be projected out into the ballroom. The Grand Ballroom's main entrance was on 17th Street, where a covered, semi-circular carriageway allowed up to three carriages at a time to unload patrons. The hotel also had several small, private ballrooms for more intimate events. Next to the ballroom on the 17th Street side was the Chinese Room—a sumptuous meeting and banqueting room inspired by The Peacock Room by James McNeill Whistler. (Note: The Chinese Room was decorated in vibrant red and blue. The woodwork was heavily lacquered, and the walls covered in expensive tapestries and hangings or decorated with murals featuring gold gilt. The room's furniture was in the Chinese Chippendale style.)

The Mayflower Hotel's interior design was created by E. S. Bullock of Albert Pick & Co. The furnishings, which cost $1.25 million ($18,817,600 in 2025 dollars), were antique and reproduction pieces in the Sheraton, Louis Quinze, and early Renaissance styles. "Walls, floors, stairs, pilasters and wainscoting in the lobby and the major function rooms [were] clad in a wide array of American and imported marbles, and ceilings and walls throughout the first floor and mezzanine [were] ornamented by finely cast, low-relief plaster decorations, often further embellished with gold leaf." The use of gold gilt to trim decoration was extensive; newspapers said the hotel contained more gold trim than any other building except the Library of Congress. Original artworks, some by quite famous artists, adorned the public spaces. These included four larger-than-life-sized portraits of the first four presidents by painter and muralist Louis Grell of Chicago. Three marble statuary groups were also displayed in the lobby and public areas: La Sirene by Denys Puech; Flora by William Couper; and The Lost Pleiad (also known as Merope Married a Mortal) by Randolph Rogers. Two smaller pieces by Rogers, Nydia, the Blind Girl of Pompeii and Boy and Dog, were also on display.

The Mayflower Hotel offered a wide range of amenities to its guests, including air conditioning in all public rooms (the first time a hotel had used air conditioning on such a large scale) and ice water and fans in all guest rooms. Services included daily maid service, a laundry, a barber shop, a beauty salon, a garage for automobiles, a telephone switchboard, and a small hospital staffed by a doctor.

=== Construction of the Annex ===
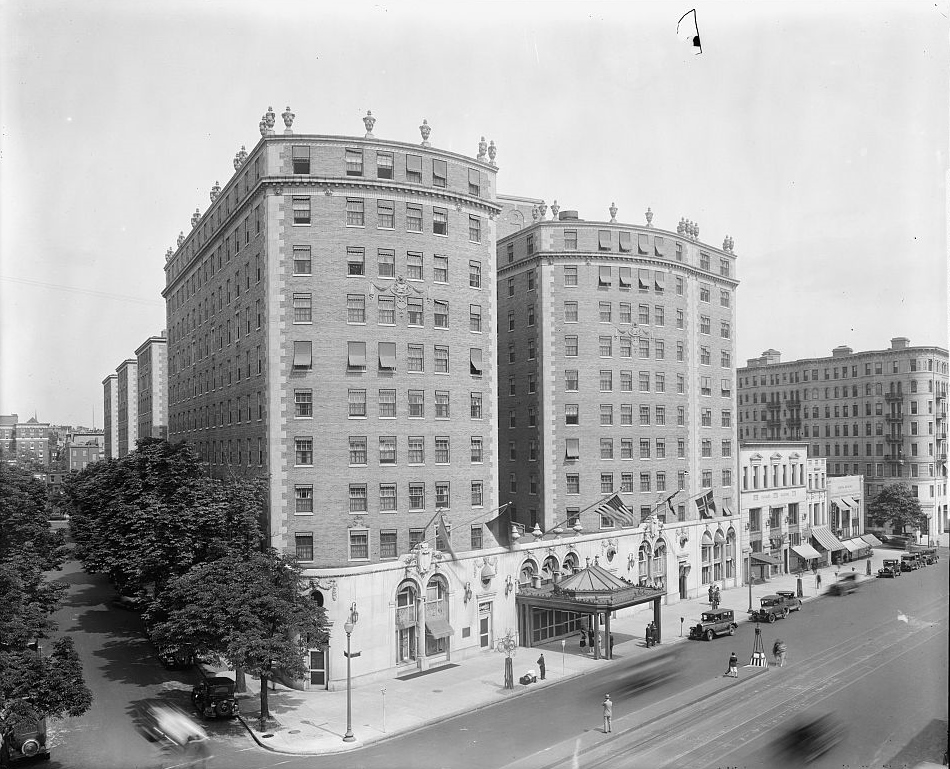
The Mayflower Hotel after completion

With the Mayflower Hotel finished but not yet furnished in September 1924, plans were made to enlarge the structure even before it opened. The new owners perceived high demand for guest room suites, and quickly designed a $1 million ($18,358,634 in 2025 dollars) addition. Construction began in October 1925, and within six weeks the 40-foot (12 m) deep foundation had been dug. The addition opened on May 31, 1925.

The most prominent features of the Annex were the Presidential Suite and the Vice Presidential Suite. The Presidential Suite occupied the 10th floor, and was decorated in green and gold in the Italianate style. The Vice Presidential Suite occupied the ninth floor, and was decorated in dull and bright yellow in the Louis XVI style. Each suite had 13 rooms, which included a foyer, drawing room, library, secretary's room, dining room, and five bedrooms—each with its own bath and kitchenette. Each suite also had a maid's room, with an attached bath. The furnishings of both suites were copies of museum pieces. The Presidential Suite featured a marquetry table with ormolu fittings; a Louis XVI cabinet with painted panels; Oriental rugs; bronze and marble urns in the Neoclassical style; drapes of silk damask; and underdrapes of silk taffeta. The suite's dining room featured Queen Anne style furniture. The Vice Presidential Suite featured a dining room with furniture in the Sheraton and Hepplewhite styles. Dining room furniture in both suites was manufactured from satin-walnut, and featured painted decorations and marquetry. The bedrooms in both suites featured Louis XVI-, Adam-, and Federal-style furniture made of satinwood, walnut, and mahogany. Each piece was painted, lacquered, or marquetried. Dust-covers for the beds were also of taffeta. Sofas and chairs in each suite were upholstered in imported brocades, while the walls were covered in hand-made tapestries. Each suite had numerous shaded lamps, porcelain and crystal art objects, and gilt mirrors. Original oil and watercolor paintings as well as etchings and engravings—many of them by famous artists—decorated the suites. Each suite's bathroom was completely tiled in white, with silver-plated fixtures for the sink and shower, an engraved glass shower door, and a Swiss shower. (Note: A Swiss shower has three shower heads, aimed horizontally at the calves, mid-section, and chest. There are three shower heads per wall, and there are three walls. A tenth shower head provides water from above. Controls permit very exact calibration of the water temperature and water pressure, often permitting these to be timed so that temperature and pressure vary during the shower.) The kitchens, too, were tiled in white, and contained an electric stove and oven, a Frigidaire refrigerator, silver tableware, complete porcelain table setting, and fine table linens.

The second through eighth floors of the Annex contained guest suites. Each suite had five bedrooms, and each bedroom had its own bath. The first floor of the Annex was occupied by the Mayflower Coffee Shop, a vastly expanded version of the highly popular but extremely small café located on the ground floor of the existing hotel. The basement of the Annex occupied by a huge laundry, which served the hotel and annex.

=== Bankruptcy of the 1930s ===
On March 31, 1928, the Mayflower Hotel's bonds were refinanced by the American Bond & Mortgage Co. (the successor to C.C. Mitchell & Co.).

The Great Depression had a significant impact on the Mayflower Hotel. It lost money (as much as $760,000 over two years), and in 1929 its affairs were placed in the hands of a special committee established by American Bond & Mortgage. The hotel continued to lose money, and on May 22, 1931, holders of the hotel's original bonds secured a ruling that the hotel was bankrupt. American Bond was declared bankrupt the same day. The receivers later alleged that the hotel had lost more than $2 million since it opened, and that American Bond had issued a large amount of bonds with the hotel as security (worsening the hotel's financial status). American Bond won dismissal of the bankruptcy ruling on June 26, A second bankruptcy was declared by the court on July 28, 1931. Fraud charges were later levied against officials of American Bond & Mortgage. American Bond finally admitted the hotel was bankrupt in October 1931.

Holders of the second bonds (issued with the hotel as security), however, feared that they would receive nothing if the Mayflower were foreclosed. They petitioned a court to remove the receivers and to appoint new trustees who would sell the hotel. The court agreed, and the sale began to move forward in 1933. Concerned about the sale, Senators Hamilton Fish Kean and Robert Rice Reynolds began an investigation into the bankruptcy and sale. In 1933, Kean and Reynolds won congressional approval in June 1934 for the Corporate Bankruptcy Act, which allowed the Mayflower Hotel itself to declare bankruptcy and refinance itself. With the receivers having made the hotel profitable once more, the hotel reorganized its finances in a court-approval bankruptcy proceeding on December 20, 1934.

Early in World War II, the skylight in the Palm Court was covered over with a mural painting. The skylight was later flocked with pieces of velvet.

=== Hilton ===
In December 1946, Hilton Hotels Corporation purchased the Mayflower Hotel for $2.6 million. Some of the Mayflower's stockholders challenged the sale, arguing the price was too low. A court dismissed the suit in May 1947. Over the next decade, Hilton Hotels spent about $1 million refurbishing the guest rooms and public spaces. Hilton Hotels purchased the Statler Hotels chain in 1954, and as a result owned multiple large hotels in many major cities, as in Washington, where they now owned the Mayflower and the Statler Hotel. Soon after, the federal government filed an antitrust action against Hilton. To resolve the suit, Hilton agreed to sell the Mayflower Hotel, the Roosevelt Hotel in New York and the Hotel Jefferson in St. Louis.

=== Hotel Corporation of America ===
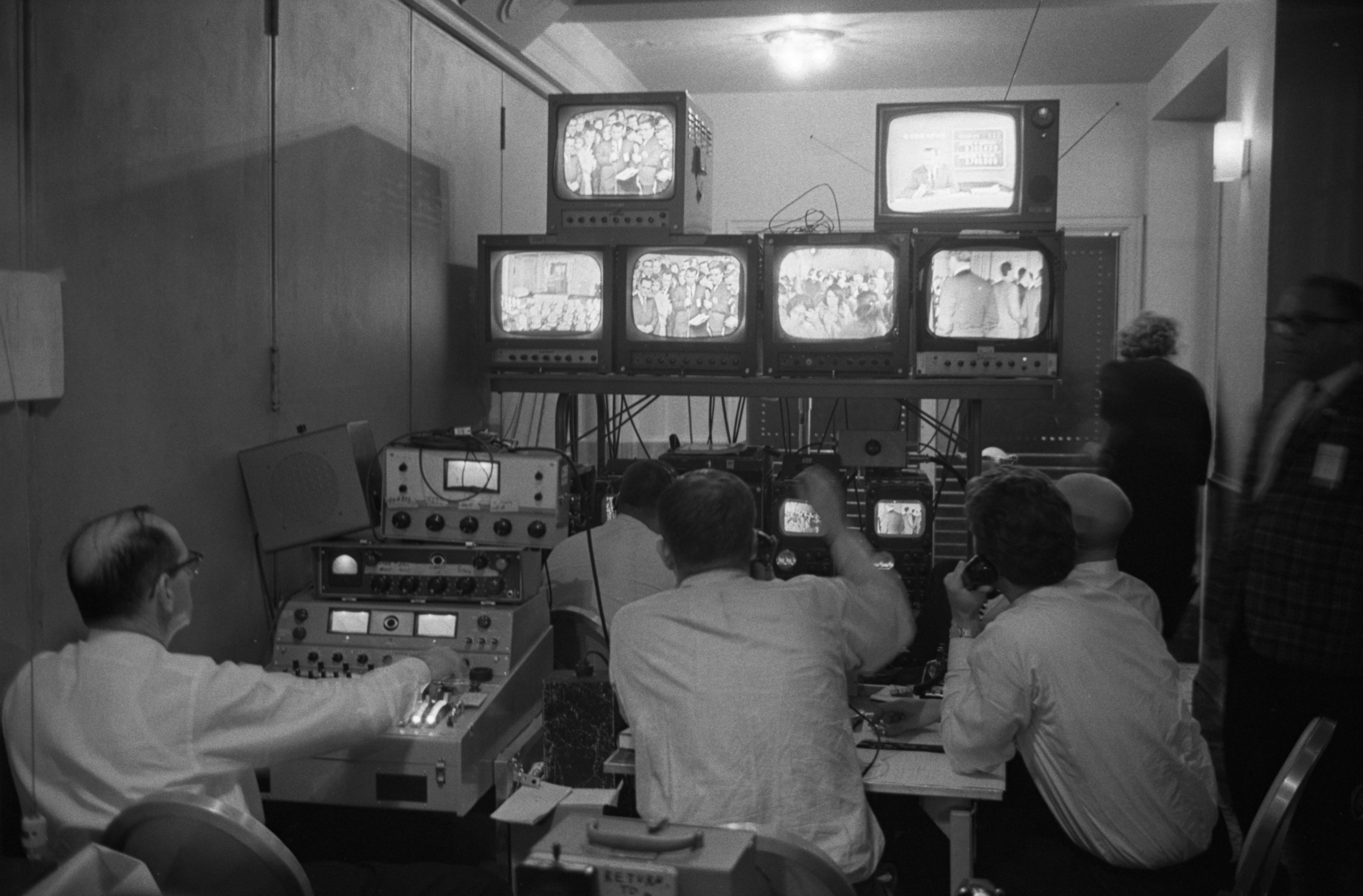
CBS broadcast technicians seated in front of monitors at the Mayflower Hotel on the night of the 1964 presidential election

Hilton Hotels sold the Mayflower to the Hotel Corporation of America (HCA) on April 1, 1956, for $12.8 million. HCA renovated the Mayflower's old Garden Terrace, renaming it the Rib Room. The hotel's occupancy rates were lower than average, however. In 1963, for example, the Mayflower lost $450,000. HCA privately expressed interest in selling the property.

=== May-Wash Associates ===
On October 28, 1965, the locally owned May-Wash Associates offered to buy the Mayflower for $14 million. May-Wash Associates consisted of William Cohen, a local real estate developer and banker who owned 50 percent of the company; Kingdon Gould Jr. and his son, Kingdon Gould III, local real estate developers who owned 35 percent; Ulysses "Blackie" Augur, a local restaurateur who owned 10 percent; and Dominic F. Antonelli, owner of a string of parking lots in the area who owned 1 percent. HCA's board of directors approved the deal on November 11, 1965. HCA continued to manage the hotel for the new owners.

The Mayflower Hotel underwent a $2.5 million refurbishment of its common rooms in 1966 and 1967. The renovation got rid of the Presidential Restaurant and renamed it Le Chatelaine. HCA was renamed Sonesta Hotels in 1970.

May-Wash Associates considered closing the Mayflower Hotel in 1971 after it lost $485,000 the previous year. Lead May-Wash investor William Cohen said that if Congress weakened the restrictions of the Height of Buildings Act of 1910, the company would tear down the Mayflower and erect a 20-story office and retail skyscraper with 500,000 square feet (46,000 m^{2}) of office space and 250,000 square feet (23,000 m^{2}) of retail space. If the Height Act remained in force, Cohen said the hotel's first two floors would be transformed into a shopping mall accommodating 40 to 50 small businesses. But the plan was abandoned later that fall when the Mayflower announced a five-year, $2.5 million renovation that would refurbish the retail stores on the Connecticut Avenue side of the structure. Then on November 1, 1971, May-Wash hired Western International Hotels to manage the property. Western International said it would invest $500,000 immediately to upgrade guest rooms (which included color television sets for the first time). Western International said the previously announced $2.5 million refurbishment would go to additional guest room renovations, and improvements to dining spaces, banqueting facilities, and ballrooms. The Rib Room lost its name (which had been trademarked by HCA, the previous manager), the facade was cleaned, and the air conditioning repaired and upgraded.

Beginning in April 1973, the Mayflower Hotel served as the temporary Embassy of China in Washington, D.C., for a time while their new embassy building at 2300 Connecticut Avenue NW was being renovated following the re-establishment of diplomatic relations between the United States and the People's Republic of China.

With the Mayflower making a profit, May-Wash Associates undertook at $2.5 million general refurbishment of the 800 guest rooms about 1977. The hotel then announced a $25 million overhaul and expansion in January 1979. The main western wing of the hotel, facing Connecticut Avenue, was to have the public rooms on the lower two levels turned into retail space, while the 448 guest rooms above would be gutted and transformed into office space. The eastern wing, in the rear, would remain a hotel. May-Wash hired architect Vlastimil Koubek to design two new floors to add to the top of the eastern wing, bringing it to the same height as the western wing. The resulting hotel would have 407 guest rooms, larger than those before, a mix of newly built rooms and remodeled existing rooms. The hotel also planned to add a health club (with racquetball court, sauna, and swimming pool) and café to the 17th Street side of the hotel. Meeting and private dining room space would be added to the structure; all plumbing and mechanical systems would be upgraded; and central air conditioning would replace the window units now in operation. The hotel sought to permanently narrow De Sales Street NW as part of its renovations.

Western International Hotels, which managed the property, was renamed Westin Hotels & Resorts in January 1981. In October 1981, May-Wash Associates announced that Stouffer Corporation, a division of Nestlé, was taking a minority interest in the Mayflower Hotel, and would assume management of the property on December 1, 1981, under a 20-year agreement. Stouffer said the hotel would be its American "flagship", and the hotel was renamed the Stouffer Mayflower Hotel.

While renovation of the eastern tower proceeded, plans for the western tower drastically changed. The Mayflower abandoned its plan to convert the tower into office space, and instead upgraded the hotel rooms in the eastern tower. In some cases, rooms were merged to create luxury suites. The change in renovation plans left the Mayflower with just 727 rooms, but added 18,000 square feet (1,700 m^{2}) of meeting room space and a new restaurant. The hotel still attempted to narrow DeSales Street NW, proposing to use the extra space to build an enclosed outdoor café (something city laws did not permit). (Note: The Mayflower's owners also said they intended to build a 24-hour restaurant where the Presidential Room was, and connect it to this outdoor café. The mezzanine above would be transformed into a cocktail lounge.)

Even as the first renovations were ending, the Mayflower Hotel embarked on another major set of refurbishments and upgrades. This project, which began in 1981 and lasted three years, cost $65 million. The hotel remained open as the project moved forward in phases. In 1981, two floors were finally added to the eastern wing of the structure. The meeting rooms on the hotel's second floor and the Board Room were refurbished, and offices on the mezzanine were removed and the space restored to public use. The following year, 200 suites received major makeovers, including the installation of baths clad in Italian marble. The Presidential Restaurant was divided into two new banqueting halls, the East Room and the State Room, and the Grand Ballroom and the Chinese Room were renovated. The restoration of the lobby and upgrading of the hotel's restaurants occurred in 1983. Artisans and technicians helped to restore the bas-relief plaster moldings and brass fixtures, clean and restore the hotel's many crystal chandeliers, and apply new gold leaf to areas where the gilt had been damaged or removed. The renovations left the hotel with 721 guest rooms (about half rebuilt and restored) and two restaurants.

The renovation uncovered many historic decorative elements which had been covered up over time. The skylight in the Presidential Room (formerly the Palm Court) was uncovered. When renovation of the former Palm Court began, two previously unknown murals by Edward Laning were discovered. The murals were dated by art experts to 1957, when the Palm Court was radically reconfigured into the Le Chatelaine restaurant. The murals, 25 feet (7.6 m) long and 14 feet (4.3 m) high, depicted Italian formal gardens. They were hidden behind a false wall when the restaurant was turned into meeting room space in early 1978. Discovered in storage were 24 fire-gilded 19th century service platters purchased from the estate of heiress Evalyn Walsh McLean in 1947.

=== Stouffer, New World and Marriott Hotels ===
After managing the hotel for ten years, Stouffer bought it outright from May-Wash in 1991 for just over $100 million. In April 1993, Stouffer Hotels was sold by Nestlé to New World Development Company of Hong Kong. Nestlé also gave New World the right to use the Stouffer brand name for 3 years, from 1993 to May 1996. New World already owned the Renaissance Hotels chain, and merged the Stouffer-branded Hotels into it. The Mayflower was renamed the Stouffer Renaissance Mayflower Hotel. In early 1996, the Stouffer branding was retired, and the hotel became the Renaissance Mayflower Hotel. Marriott International bought Renaissance Hotels from New World in February 1997.

=== Investment groups ===
Marriott sold The Mayflower to Walton Street Capital in 2005, in a package with seven other Marriott hotels, for a total of $578 million. Walton Street resold the Mayflower to Rockwood Capital in 2007 for $260 million, financed with a $200 million securitized loan.

The hotel, appraised at $285 million in 2008, fell in value to $160 million by 2010. With Rockwood's loan over-leveraged, they refinanced the hotel in 2015, with a $160 million loan from Apollo Commercial Real Estate Finance Inc. and other lenders. Also in 2015, Rockwood sold off 71 of the hotel's rooms to Marriott for $32 million, for use by the company's Marriott Vacation Club Destinations time-share division.

In May 2015, the hotel switched from Marriott's Renaissance Hotels brand to Marriott's Autograph Collection brand, dropping the word "Renaissance" from its name. The move was prompted by studies which showed that younger travelers were not brand-loyal and instead looked for individuality and uniqueness when shopping for a hotel stay. Marriott also learned that few travelers knew the Mayflower was a Renaissance Hotel, which made the branding superfluous.

A $20 million refurbishment of all rooms and the creation of a club level was completed in August 2015. Each floor of the hotel was given a theme corresponding to a decade, with the second floor devoted to the 1920s, third floor to the 1930s, and so on to the tenth floor. Each room received updated, modern furniture, and the hallways were wallpapered in grey and white with a pattern reminiscent of the lobby mezzanine railing. Each of the hotel's presidential suites also received a complete makeover, and now have a separate office. Rooms on the seventh floor were eliminated to make space for the Marriott Vacation Club Pulse. This left the Mayflower with a total of 581 rooms (512 guest rooms, 67 suites, and two presidential suites). At the completion of the room renovation, the Mayflower announced it would begin a major refurbishment of the hotel's ballrooms and meeting space in late 2016.

In July 2021, Apollo Commercial Real Estate Finance Inc., having already provided Rockwood financing for the 2015 refinancing, bought out Rockwood's share of the hotel, for $86 million.

== Renovations ==
=== Lobby ===
In the hotel's early years, the lobby skylight was painted over.

The lobby originally featured a small store and cocktail bar in its northwest corner. The main entrance to this space was at the corner where the two diagonal walls of the hotel met at the corner of Connecticut Avenue and DeSales Street. In March 1948, the retail area was taken over by the hotel and expanded into a much larger bar and dining space named the Town and Country Lounge. Over the next four decades, the bar became a favorite of Washington politicians and power-brokers. The Sunday Times of London rated Town and Country as one of the "star bars" of the world (alongside the Polo Lounge at the Beverly Hills Hotel in Beverly Hills, California; the mob-constructed lobby bar of the Hotel Nacional de Cuba in Havana, Cuba; and Harry's New York Bar in Paris, France).

The lobby mezzanine was closed off to create office space in 1962. The ceiling of the elevator foyer was lowered, which covered up a bas-relief plaster sculpture on the architrave above the east entrance to the elevator foyer and a sunburst medallion on the ceiling of the elevator foyer were both covered over (but not removed). Intricate plaster capitals on the piers in the lobby were also removed at this time. At some point, a door was cut through the curved wall opposite the elevator bank.

The offices were removed from the lobby mezzanine in the 1981–1984 renovation, and the mezzanine restored to its original function. The door in the curved wall opposite the elevators was also sealed.

The Town and Country Lounge was slightly renovated in 2010, with hardwood floors replacing the carpet. The bar's future, however, was not secure. In January 2011, the hotel's lobby, restaurant, bar, and retail spaces underwent a six-month, $5 million renovation (their first since the 1981–1984 refurbishment). The Town and Country Lounge ceased to exist, and the Thomas Pink luxury men's clothing store moved into the space. Thomas Pink had formerly occupied the site of the old Mayflower Coffee Shop on the south side of the lobby. Offices near this space were removed to provide expansion of the space, and a new restaurant to be named EDGAR Bar + Lounge. The lobby itself underwent additional restoration, overseen by the architectural firm of Jonathan Nehmer & Associates, which flipped the lobby orientation.

=== Presidential Room ===
The Presidential Room was originally decorated in the Adams style. The floor of the room was white Vermont marble tile. Thin diagonal lines of verd antique ran across the floor. Around the floor was an inner, narrow border of verd antique, with a 3-foot (0.91 m) wide border of blue-veined white Pavonazzo marble. Seven square piers, with Doric capitals and gilt festoons, created a narrow colonnade along the north and south walls. A wainscot 4 feet (1.2 m) high, made of white Sylacauga marble with a verd antique baseboard, was placed on the walls and around all the piers. An acanthus crown molding topped the room, and gilt plaster moldings in the shape of finials surrounded each window and doorway. Turned wood spindles decorated the northern wall. The crests of the 13 Colonies, in gilt and polychrome, lined the walls as decorative elements. On the south side of the room, there was a "service pavilion" 7 feet (2.1 m) wide and one story high. A narrow set of stairs gave access to the top of the service pavilion, which was enclosed by a decorative iron railing. The ceiling of the room was decoration with Adams style bas-relief plaster moldings. The center of the ceiling was a long rectangle stretching nearly the long length of the room, surrounded by gilt plaster wreath moldings. A gilt chandelier with silk shades hung from the center of the room. Shallow, circular domes surrounded by gilt plaster wreath moldings existed at the east and west ends of the room. In the center of each dome was a delicate grating, from which hung two more gilt chandeliers with silk shades.

At some point in time, the stairs leading to the top of the service pavilion were removed. The structure was clad in mirrors separated by narrow pilasters, and most (but not all) of the spindles removed from the north wall.

The old Presidential Room was partitioned in the 1981–1984 renovation, and two ballrooms/meeting rooms—the State Room and the East Room—were created out of the space. A removable metal partition was installed to divide the room as well as the service pavilion. Almost none of the other original decorations of the room have been changed since its 1925 creation, however.

=== Palm Court ===
The north wall of the Palm Court originally consisted of structural piers, leaving the room open to the Promenade. Pilasters along the south wall mimicked this look and gave the room an aesthetic symmetry. A bay in the east wall was framed by columns and an arch, and an oriel balcony on the mezzanine level projected into the room. The Palm Court had a floor of American travertine, a maple dance floor, wainscoting of gold-veined St. Genevieve marble, and intricate plaster moldings on entablature and ceiling.

Walls were added between the piers in 1934, and the Palm Court was internally partitioned in 1947. In 1950, arches were constructed between the piers of the north wall and the pilasters of the south wall in an attempt to connect the walls visually. In 1957, the Palm Court was radically renovated. Its Victorian ironwork was removed and a Neoclassical style decorating scheme implemented. Two large murals by painter Edward Laning were added, and framed with nonstructural columns in an attempt to simulate the vista from a verandah. The room's eastern bay was sealed off, and small staging vestibules added to the south wall, leaving the room strongly asymmetrical.

During the 1981–1984 renovation, the east bay was reopened. The old Palm Court was now confusingly renamed the Presidential Room.

=== The Promenade ===
The Promenade (Note: According to architectural measurements made in 1983, it is 212 feet (65 m) long from the lobby to the 17th Street entrance.) originally featured pilasters that defined six bays along both its north and south sides. The capital of each pilaster was decorated with the profile of a different mythological hero, and festooned with swag. Each pilaster had a faux pedestal made of verd antique decorated with plaster rosettes and gilt plaster wreaths. The wainscoting was 3 feet (0.91 m) high, and of white Alabama marble. A baseboard of verd antique and a gray marble dado rail completed the wainscot, and a gilt plaster acanthus crown molding decorated the ceiling. Arches in the north wall gave access to meeting rooms. The arches leading to the Grand Ballroom, Chinese Room, and the original Presidential Room were topped with sculpted architraves of white Alabama marble, while the other arches were each topped by a gilt plaster crest. Beveled mirrors stood between the pilasters. The ceiling of the Promenade consisted of octagonal coffers alternating with small square coffers. At the center of each square coffer was a gilt plaster rosette. The floor was of white Vermont marble and verd antique marble, with a border of verd antique. Architect Shirley Maxwell has noted that the Mayflower's "block-long long lobby and promenade form what is probably the grandest indoor 'street' in Washington..."

At some point in time, the arches which led to the small meeting rooms along the north wall were filled in with gilt-edged mirrors.

=== The Grand Ballroom ===
The Grand Ballroom was the most opulent room in the Mayflower Hotel. As with the Presidential Room, square piers formed colonnades along the north and south walls. Ionic capitals featuring satanic faces topped each pier. A stage with a proscenium arch was located on the west end. Mirrored French Doors formed the Grand Ballroom's east wall. These could be opened to provide access to the Chinese Room beyond. A small curved balcony, reached by narrow stairs in the northeast and southeast corners of the ballroom, projected over the French doors. The wainscoting was of tan St. Genevieve marble. Six doors pierced the north wall and led to the Promenade, with the end doors reached by curving steps. The floor consisted of a wooden floor with a border of marble. Delicate, bas-relief gilt plaster decorations covered the piers, walls, and ceiling.

=== The Chinese Room ===
The Chinese Room had a square floorplan. A flight of short steps led to the entrance, which was in the curved, north wall. Large, rectangular piers framed an alcove (which ran nearly the depth of the room) on the east. The hardwood floor featured a baseboard of verd antique, and a crown molding of gilt plaster acanthus leaves surrounds the ceiling. The ceiling of the Chinese Room consists of a dramatic elliptical dome. A gilt plaster molding of wreathes surrounds the dome, while the rest of the ceiling is covered in chinoiserie paintings of animals, people, and trees. A two-tiered crystal chandelier hung from the center of the dome.

At some point in time, the windows in the east wall were filled in, and mirrors inserted in the new, false casements.

=== The District Ballroom ===
The Garden Terrace (Originally Named), located on the first below-ground floor, featured Italianate decor, a coffered copper ceiling, a marble fountain, plaster walls in warm pastel tints, alcoves designed to look like arbors, and murals of early Washington, D.C., and nearby Mount Vernon.

The Garden Terrace was radically redecorated in September 1940, and its name changed to the Sapphire Room. Designed by Robert F. Beresford, one of the hotel's original architects, the rear of the room's stage was clad in glowing sapphire-blue glass brick. The overhead arches were clad in aluminum, most of the decoration in the room removed, and the remaining surfaces painted bright blue. Carpet with a brick-like pattern in blue covered the floor.

In about 1950, the Sapphire Room was redecorated in the Colonial Revival style, a popular at the time, and renamed the Williamsburg Room. It was open by at least October 1950. The alcoves were removed and replaced with a raised terrace on the north, east, and south sides of the room. A railing with an oak handrail and turned-wood balusters enclosed the gallery, and a shallow concave stage was added to the west wall. Pilasters, paneled in warm-colored wood, were added to the walls. A wainscot and dado rail of wood covered the lower part of the walls. A highly intricate plaster architrave and broken pediment surmounted the entrances to the terrace.

The Williamsburg Room became the Colonial Room about January 1971.

=== Mayflower Coffee Shop ===
The Mayflower Coffee Shop originally occupied a small space south and slightly west of the main desk and front office on the west side of the hotel. This space was quite small, but was vastly expanded in April 1925 with the completion of the Annex. A soda fountain and candy shop occupied the old coffee shop space, while the coffee shop expanded into a much larger space south of the lobby/front desk area. The coffee shop, which also served small meals and box lunches, was decorated with paintings of Colonial America and was intended to look like an old-fashioned coffee house.

In 1956, with the change in hotel management, the front desk was moved to the north side of the lobby (occupying space previously used for phone booths). The soda fountain and candy shop were eliminated, and the restaurant expanded to occupy the space. The restaurant was renamed the Rib Room. When Western International Hotels rook over from HCA, the restaurant lost its name (which was a trademark of HCA). The restaurant was subsequently named The Carvery in July 1972. The Carvery closed in 2004.

== Notable events ==
The Mayflower Hotel hosted the Inaugural Ball of President Calvin Coolidge just two weeks after its opening. It hosted an Inaugural Ball every four years until it hosted its final ball in January 1981. It has not hosted an Inaugural Ball since. President-elect Herbert Hoover established his presidential planning team offices in the hotel in January 1928, and his Vice President, Charles Curtis, lived there in one of the hotel's residential guest rooms during his four years in office. Senator Huey Long also lived at the Mayflower, taking eight suites in the hotel from January 25, 1932, to March 1934. President-elect Franklin D. Roosevelt spent March 2 and 3 in Suites 776 and 781 at the Mayflower Hotel before his inauguration on March 4. (Note: It is a myth that Roosevelt crafted the critical phrase "The only thing we have to fear is fear itself" while at the Mayflower. According to historian Davis Houck, Roosevelt aide Louis Howe wrote that line on February 28, 1933, while the Roosevelt party was still at Hyde Park, New York.) United States Deputy Secretary of the Treasury and former Governor of North Carolina Oliver Max Gardner and his wife, Fay Webb-Gardner, lived at the hotel from 1946 to 1947.

Two events of significance during World War II happened at the Mayflower. In June 1942, George John Dasch and seven other spies from Nazi Germany entered the United States after being transported to American shores via a submarine. Their goal, named Operation Pastorius, was to engage in sabotage against key infrastructure. But after encountering a United States Coast Guard patrol moments after landing, Dasch decided the plan was useless. On June 19, 1942, he checked into Room 351 at the Mayflower Hotel and promptly betrayed his comrades. Eighteen months later, a committee of the American Legion met in Room 570 at the Mayflower Hotel from December 15 to 31, 1943, to draft legislation to assist returning military members reintegrate into society. Their proposed legislation, the Servicemen's Readjustment Act of 1944—known informally as the G.I. Bill—was put into final draft from by Harry W. Colmery on Mayflower Hotel stationery.

Twice, the Mayflower has been the site where a U.S. presidential campaign was launched, and twice it hosted events which proved to be turning points in a presidential nomination. In March 1931, Franklin D. Roosevelt was vying with Al Smith for the Democratic presidential nomination of 1932. John J. Raskob, chair of the Democratic National Committee (DNC), opposed Roosevelt's candidacy. Knowing that Roosevelt had privately committed to repealing Prohibition but had not done so publicly (leaving him "damp"), Raskob attempted to force the DNC, then meeting at the Mayflower Hotel, to adopt a "wet" (or repeal) plank in the party platform. Instead of drawing Roosevelt out, the maneuver deeply offended Southern "dry" (anti-repeal) Democrats—who abandoned Smith and threw their support to the allegedly more moderate Roosevelt, and helped him secure the nomination. In 1948, President Harry S. Truman told a cheering audience of Young Democrats of America at a dinner at the Mayflower on May 14 that he intended to seek re-election in 1948. Former Peace Corps and Office of Economic Opportunity director Sargent Shriver announced his run for President of the United States at the Mayflower on September 20, 1975. Shriver withdrew from the race after a very poor showing, but a more successful campaign began there in 2008. Senator Barack Obama had locked down the 2008 Democratic nomination for President on June 3, 2008. Hillary Clinton conceded the nomination to Obama on June 7, and introduced Obama to about 300 of her leading contributors at a meeting at the Mayflower on June 26, 2008.

J. Edgar Hoover, director of the Federal Bureau of Investigation (FBI), lunched nearly every day at the Mayflower Hotel's Rib Room with Clyde Tolson, associate director of the FBI, from 1952 until Hoover's death in 1972. Hoover had the same lunch every day: chicken soup followed by a salad of iceberg lettuce, grapefruit, and cottage cheese. Buttered white toast was served on the side. (He brought his own diet salad dressing.) Hoover was so well known at the Rib Room that he sometimes ducked out through the kitchen to avoid reporters.

The front of the Mayflower was where The Washington Post national editor Ben Bagdikian transferred copied portions of the Pentagon Papers, an internal DoD study of the history of the Vietnam War given to him by Daniel Ellsberg, to U.S. Senator Mike Gravel, for reading into the congressional record, at midnight on June 26, 1971.

During the Senate Watergate hearings in June 1973, presidential aide John Dean was on the witness "hot seat" for five days. Throughout this highly charged and historic event the accuracy of Dean's testimony, and his personal veracity were called into question by the president's defenders and others. History has mostly judged Dean to have demonstrated a formidable, almost photographic memory. However, Dean's sworn testimony that he met with Nixon's personal attorney Herbert Kalmbach at the Mayflower Hotel Coffee shop, in furtherance of making illegal hush-money payments to the Watergate burglars was proven to be false. Dean's inaccurate testimony was a brief setback to his case, as the meeting between Dean and Kalmbach occurred at the Statler Hilton Hotel, not the Mayflower Hotel. As it turned out, and coincidentally, the coffee shop at the Statler Hilton hotel was named the Mayflower Coffee Shop and as of July 1972, the Mayflower Hotel did not operate a coffee shop. At times, John Dean was adamant that the meeting took place at the Mayflower Hotel, although he placed the hotel on 16th Street (the location of the Statler Hilton) and also stated that he would continually confuse the Statler Hilton Hotel with the Mayflower Hotel despite having lived and worked in the Washington D.C.area for about ten years.

The Mayflower has been in the news several times in relation to political sex scandals. Judith Exner, who claimed to be President John F. Kennedy's mistress, said she stayed in the hotel while in D.C. to secretly meet with the president for sexual trysts. Monica Lewinsky stayed at the Mayflower Hotel when her affair with President Bill Clinton was in the news, and she was extensively interviewed by federal investigators about the scandal in the Presidential Suite. The Mayflower was also the location where Lewinsky was photographed with President Clinton at a campaign event not long before the 1996 election; this photograph later became an iconic component of the media coverage of the scandal. On March 10, 2008, The New York Times reported that New York Governor Eliot Spitzer patronized a high class prostitution service called Emperors Club VIP while staying at the Mayflower on February 13. Spitzer allegedly had sex for over two hours with a $1,000-an-hour call girl in room 871 while registered under the alias George Fox.

== Rating ==
The AAA gave the hotel four diamonds out of five in 1992. The hotel has maintained that rating every year, and received four diamonds again for 2016. Forbes Travel Guide (formerly known as Mobil Guide) declined to give the hotel either five or four stars in 2016, and did not put the hotel on its "recommended" list.

== See also ==
- Mueller report
- Timeline of Russian interference in the 2016 United States elections

== Bibliography ==
- Cohen, Judith R. (1987). The Mayflower Hotel: Grande Dame of Washington, D.C. New York: Balance House. ISBN 9780940577008.
- Davis, Kenneth S. (1985). FDR, the New York Years: 1928–1933. New York: Random House. ISBN 9780394516714.
- Dobbs, Michael (2004). Saboteurs: The Nazi Raid on America. New York: Vintage Books. ISBN 9781299171930.
- Evelyn, Douglas E.; Dickson, Paul; Ackerman, S.J. (2008). On This Spot: Pinpointing the Past in Washington, D.C. Sterling, Va.: Capital Books. ISBN 9781933102702.
- "Grell, Louis". Who Was Who in American History: Arts and Letters. Chicago: Marquis Who's Who. 1975.
- Houck, Davis W. (2002). FDR and Fear Itself: The First Inaugural Address. College Station, Tx.: Texas A&M University Press. ISBN 9781585441976.
- Hughes, Andy K. (2013). A History of Political Scandals. Barnsley, South Yorkshire, UK: Remember When. ISBN 9781844680894.
- Johnson, Dennis W. (2009). The Laws That Shaped America: Fifteen Acts of Congress and Their Lasting Impact. New York: Routledge. ISBN 9781135837570.
- Karabell, Zachary (2001). The Last Campaign: How Harry Truman Won the 1948 Election. New York: Vintage Books. ISBN 9780307428868.
- Kessler, Pamela (2005). Undercover Washington: Where Famous Spies Lived, Worked, and Loved. Sterling, Va.: Capital Books. ISBN 9781931868976.
- McClinsey, Keith (2007). Washington D.C.'s Mayflower Hotel. Charleston, S.C.: Arcadia Pub. ISBN 9780738552569.
- Mettler, Suzanne (2005). Soldiers to Citizens: The G.I. Bill and the Making of the Greatest Generation. New York: Oxford University Press. ISBN 9781429468992.
- Proctor, John Clagett; Williams, E. Melvin; Black, Frank P. (1930). Washington, Past and Present: A History. New York: Lewis Historical Pub. Co.
- Simon, James F. (2012). FDR and Chief Justice Hughes: The President, the Supreme Court, and the Epic Battle Over the New Deal. New York: Simon and Schuster. ISBN 9781416578895.
- Williams, T. Harry (1969). Huey Long. New York: Knopf.
