= 98th Scripps National Spelling Bee =

2026 spelling competition

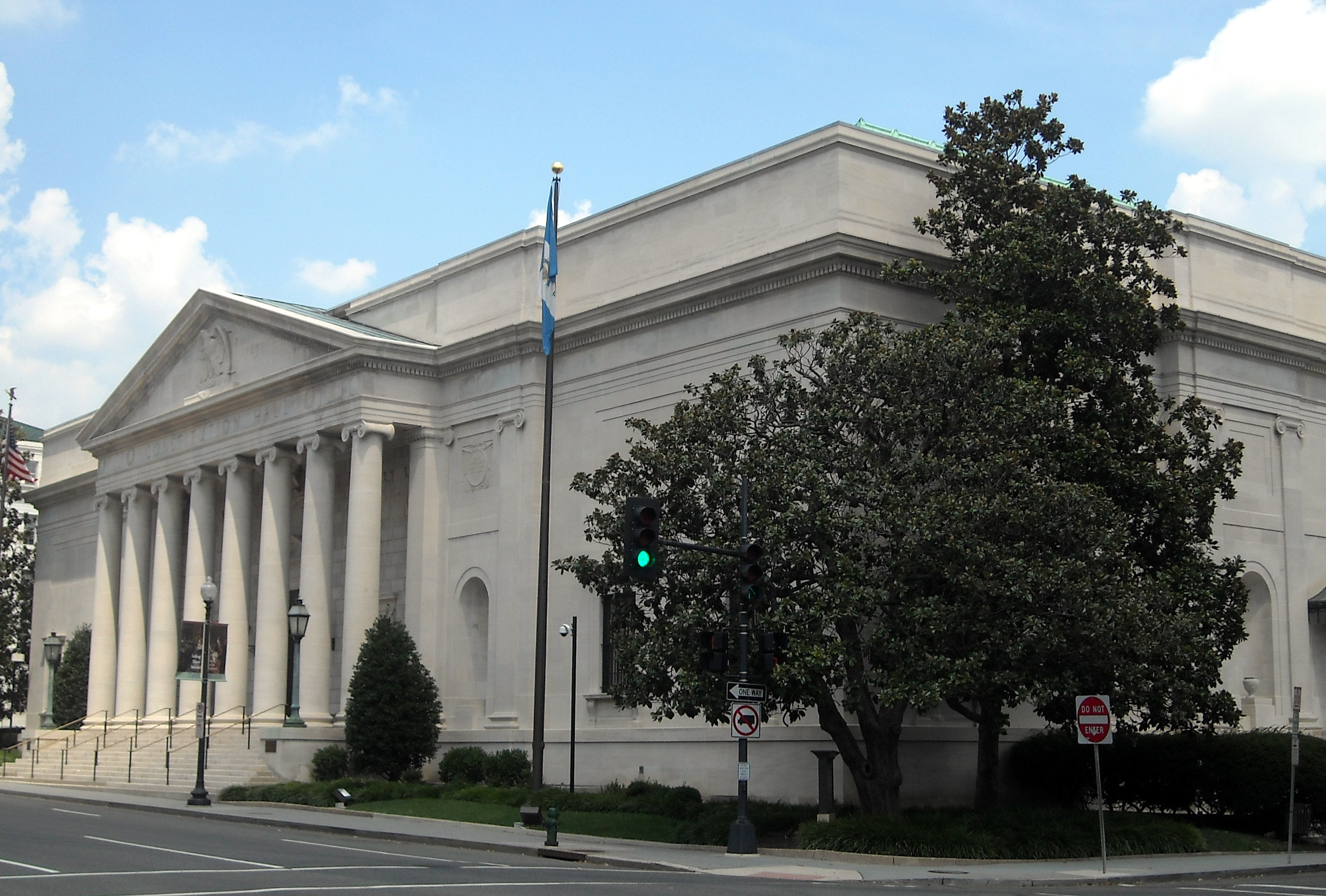
- DAR Constitution Hall, Washington, D.C.
- Date: May 26–28, 2026
- Location: DAR Constitution Hall, Washington, D.C.
- Winner: Shrey Parikh
- Sponsor: San Bernardino County Superintendent of Schools
- Sponsor location: San Bernardino, California
- Winning word: bromocriptine (spell-off)
- No. of contestants: 247
- Pronouncer: Jacques Bailly and Brian Sietsema

The 98th Scripps National Spelling Bee was a spelling bee competition being held at DAR Constitution Hall in Washington, D.C. out of a desire to bring the bee back to D.C. proper after being held at the Gaylord National Resort & Convention Center in National Harbor, Maryland, from 2011 to 2025. This bee marked the first time DAR Constitution Hall served as the venue in the 101-year history of the bee.

The 2026 bee welcomed 247 spellers from the United States and its territories of Guam, Puerto Rico, and the U.S. Virgin Islands, as well as the nations of The Bahamas, Canada, Ghana, Nigeria, and the United Arab Emirates. Spellers arrived to register on Sunday, May 24, 2026, competed from May 26-May 28, and closed out the week with a "Bee Week Bash" celebration at the Smithsonian National Museum of Natural History on Friday, May 29, before returning home.

== Background ==
The Scripps National Spelling Bee begins with regional and school-level spelling bees for students in grades 8 and under. The national competition features preliminary, quarterfinal, semifinal, and final rounds. The winner receives a $50,000 cash prize, a commemorative medal, and the Scripps Cup. The winner also received a free trip to the Universal Studios Orlando Resort.

== Competition ==
=== The Bee Week Experience ===
Bee Week allows spellers to build community and camaraderie, as well as to engage with friends met at other spelling bees.

Spellers expressed mixed reactions to the venue change from the Gaylord National Resort to the DAR Constitution Hall, some citing crowded spaces, lack of dining options, and the inconvenience of no longer competing at the same place they lodge; others expressing excitement at being close to sights such as the National Mall. The bee coincided with the start of construction for UFC Freedom 250, which closed off The Ellipse, the most direct route between the hotel and the hall.

=== Format ===
The bee format is as follows:
On Tuesday, May 26, the preliminary rounds began: round 1 was a spelling round sourced from the "2026 Words of Champions" guide; round 2 was a vocabulary round also sourced from "2026 Words of Champions"; round 3 was a written test sourced from the Merriam-Webster Unabridged Dictionary, which was also the source for all subsequent rounds.
On Wednesday, May 27, the bee had its quarterfinals: round 4, spelling; round 5, vocabulary; round 6 onward, spelling. The semifinals ran after a break, and they started with a spelling round, then a vocabulary round, and spelling rounds afterward.
On Thursday, May 28, the finals ran using the same spelling round, then vocabulary round, and spelling rounds afterward. The rules allowed for a spell-off to determine the champion, as was used in the 2022 and 2024 bee finals. During this lightning-round format, each speller has 90 seconds to spell as many words as possible from the same list given to each speller.

=== Speller Statistics ===
From the Bee's 2026 Media Guide, speller demographics are:
Four spellers were 9 year olds; 12 were 10 year olds; 35 were 11 year olds; 43 were 12 year olds; 82 were 13 year olds; 70 were 14 year olds; and one was a 15 year old.
Two were 3rd graders; four were 4th graders; 26 were 5th graders; 44 were 6th graders; 60 were 7th graders; 111 were 8th graders.
For gender, 103 were girls; 140 were boys; one identified as non-binary; and three preferred not to answer.
Public school students were the majority at the bee with 181 attending them. Additionally, 30 attended private schools; 18 attended charter schools; nine attended home schools, and nine attended parochial schools.

Francis Luya from Dededo, Guam, traveled the farthest at more than 7,000 miles to attend the bee.

Twenty-four spellers had relatives who competed across 45 different competitions, seven were twins, and one pair of siblings (Priya and Ryan Sekera from Granite Bay, California) also competed.

=== Returning Spellers ===
Seventy-eight of the spellers returned from previous bees, including 64 who were in the 2025 bee.

Three of the 2025 Scripps Bee finalists returned: third-place finisher Sarv Dharavane from Dunwoody, Georgia, and both 7th-place finishers Esha Marupudi from Chandler, Arizona, and Oliver Halkett from Los Angeles, California.

Four of the spellers who tied for tenth place (narrowly missing the final rounds) in 2025 also returned:
Hannah Kuo from Lucerne Valley, California
Ethan Robert from New Berlin, Wisconsin
Zwe Spacetime from Fort Washington, Maryland
Adarsh Venkannagari from Acton, Massachusetts

Zwe, the younger brother of the 2021 champion Zaila Avant-garde, noted the significance of a potential win at the bee, stating that "[it would mean] a lot" given that “No Black boy, whether African American or non-African American...has won Scripps yet". He adds that "The part of Black History, being the brother of Zaila Avant-garde, who was the first African American, second Black girl [after Jamaica's Jody-Anne Maxwell in 1998], to win the Nationals, ... it would be, for me, the [possibility] and historical significance of my win".

Two finalists from the 2024 bee returned to compete: Shrey Parikh from Rancho Cucamonga, California, who placed third, and YY Liang from Hartsdale, New York, who placed seventh. Shrey reported gratitude upon returning in his final year of competition after losing his school bee in 2025 while ill, subsequently working with three coaches to prepare as best he could to potentially win in 2026.

One finalist from the 2023 bee also returned: Sarah Fernandes from Omaha, Nebraska, who placed tenth.

Three spellers competed in their fourth consecutive national bee: Siyona Kandala of San Antonio, Texas; Sariah Titus of Abilene, Texas; and Adarsh Venkannagari of Acton, Massachusetts.

=== Broadcast ===
Scripps-owned Ion TV was the broadcaster of the event, which was produced by Embassy Row, a division of Sony Pictures Television. ESPN senior writer and Emmy Award-winning analyst Mina Kimes hosted the televised semifinals and finals alongside longtime analyst Paul Loeffler, a former national competitor who commemorated his 20th year as a bee analyst. Paul is also the older brother of the bee's director Corrie Loeffler, herself a former bee competitor whose introduction was watching him compete at the national level. Sony executive Michael Davies helped bring Kimes into the fold in an effort to reimagine the broadcast and boost the bee's ratings.

== Results ==
=== Preliminary Rounds ===
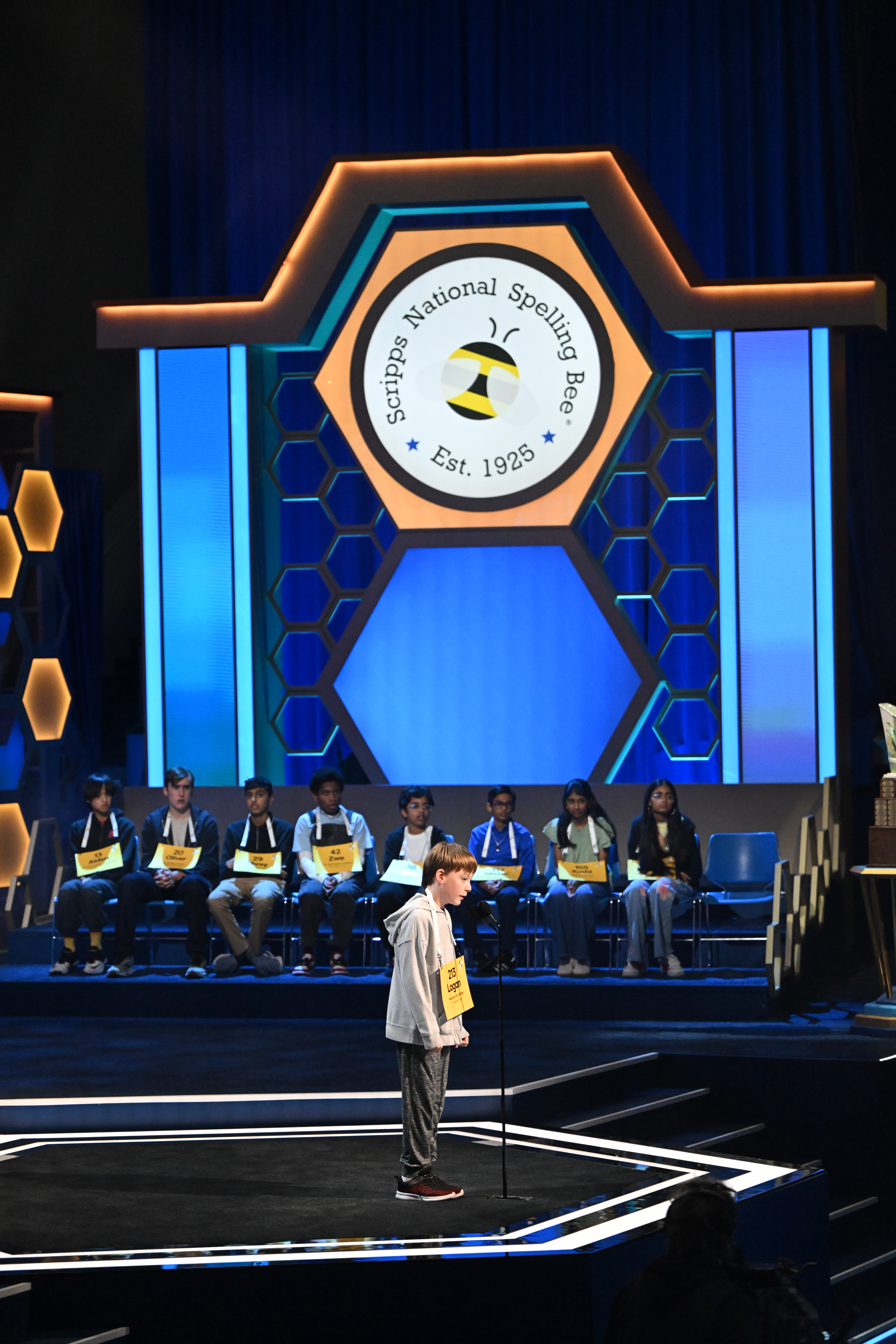
Spellers at the 98th Scripps National Spelling Bee

Two hundred forty-seven spellers started the competition, with 95 qualifying as quarterfinalists. Fifty-four moved onto the semifinals, with nine of them qualifying for the finals:

Speller 13. Aiden Meng, a 12-year old seventh grader representing San Ramon Valley Rotary Club of Danville, California
Speller 20. Oliver Halkett, a 14-year old eighth grader representing Los Angeles County Office of Education of Los Angeles, California
Speller 29. Shrey Parikh, a 14-year old eighth grader representing San Bernardino County Superintendent of Schools of San Bernardino, California
Speller 42. Zwe Spacetime, a 14-year old eighth grader representing The Washington Informer of Washington, D.C.
Speller 56. Sarv Dharavane, a 12-year old sixth grader representing Georgia Association of Educators of Tucker, Georgia
Speller 137. Ishaan Gupta, a 12-year old seventh grader representing Hudson County Office of Cultural & Heritage Affairs/Tourism Development of Jersey City, New Jersey
Speller 155. Kushi Gottimukkala, a 13-year old seventh grader representing Carolina Panthers of Charlotte, North Carolina
Speller 207. Avishka Dudala, a 13-year old eighth grader representing Dallas Sports Commission of Dallas, Texas
Speller 213. Logan Bailey, a 12-year old sixth grader representing Houston City College of Houston, Texas

Among the 15 spellers tying for 10th place in Round 9 was Zachary Teoh, a third grader representing Houston City College who had, as a second grader in 2025, emerged as the youngest speller ever to win the Houston-area regional competition.

=== Spell-off ===
After Sarv Dharavane marked his second consecutive third-place finish, judges implemented the bee's spell-off rules to determine the winner, using a lightning-round tiebreaker where each speller spelled as many words in a 90-second timespan as possible. Shrey Parikh spelled 32 words to Ishaan Gupta's 25, and Shrey earned the Scripps Cup as a result.

Shrey's final spell-off word was his winning word: bromocriptine, which is "a polypeptide alkaloid that is a derivative of ergot and mimics the activity of dopamine."

Shrey credited his success to multiple strategies: working with three coaches, obtaining word lists and study guides, attempting to learn every language pattern, learning as many words as possible, and competing against other spellers year-round in online bees operating outside of the Scripps competition. He also took a six-month hiatus from spelling after his 2025 loss, which allowed him to rededicate himself to his craft upon his return.

When asked how he prepared to spell so many words so fast, Shrey remarked: “Spelling fast is what I do every day, so you know the spell-off kind of came naturally and it was just another day of spelling.”

=== Final Rankings ===
1st Place:

Shrey Parikh

2nd Place:

Ishaan Gupta

3rd Place:

Sarv Dharavane

4th Place:

Kushi Gottimukkala

5th Place:

Logan Bailey

6th place (tie):

Avishka Dudala
Zwe Spacetime
Oliver Halkett
Aiden Meng

== Championship round word list ==
=== Round 10 ===
- essoinee
- cobola
- gelsemia
- pauraque
- quillai
- dodecatheon
- trypograph
- goumier
- hypaspists

=== Round 11 (vocabulary) ===
- cuneiform
- pro tempore
- stymie
- bradycardia
- denouement
- contrapuntal
- badinage
- felicitous
- compos mentis

=== Round 12 ===
- catometope
- Faesulae
- Bhubaneswar
- vaesite
- cour d'honneur
- euphausid
- biuret
- oconee bells
- Ceutorhynchus

=== Round 13 ===
- potto
- kurgan
- sambaqui
- cere
- raguly

=== Round 14 ===
- Pluchea
- cydnid
- pasinia
- ecanda
- Quincke tube

=== Round 15 ===
- hwyl
- Tethyan
- Nanyukian
- cara sposa

=== Round 16 ===
- Metohija
- Kadohadacho
- Kolami

=== Round 17 ===
- Telei
- disa
- Igdyr

=== Round 18 ===
- Philepitta
- Ertebolle

== Spell-off word list ==
- torrone
- enthymeme
- Iguape
- Denebola
- fais-dodo
- cywyddau
- pohutukawa
- monadnock
- émeute
- nannofossil
- tongkang
- Natchitoches
- flaith
- semele
- rusell
- sawder
- campernelle
- Nicol
- Zamenis
- Tharparkar
- tlachtli
- madoqua
- retiarius
- balintawak
- tessaraconter
- taurokathapsia
- rapakivi
- uayeb
- paroemia
- melengket
- teraglin (Parikh)
- homelyn (Parikh)
- chikungunya (Parikh)
- bromocriptine (Parikh)
- cashaw (Parikh)
