= 73rd Scripps National Spelling Bee =

Spelling bee held in the United States in 2000

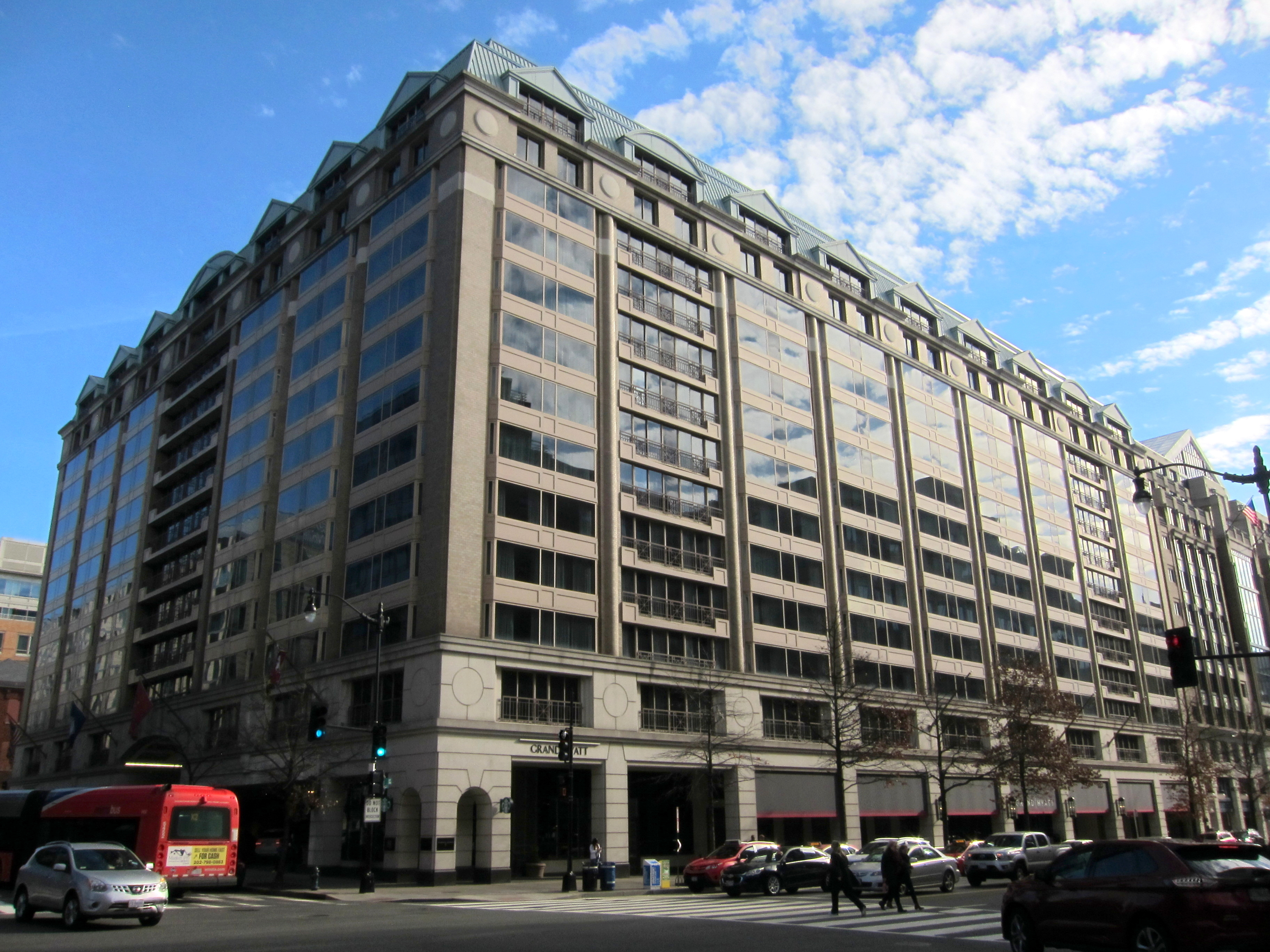
- The Grand Hyatt Washington in Washington, D.C., hosted the Scripps National Spelling Bee.
- Date: May 31 – June 1, 2000
- Location: Grand Hyatt Washington, Washington, D.C.
- Winner: George Thampy (12 at time of win)
- Sponsor: St. Louis Post-Dispatch
- Sponsor location: St. Louis, Missouri
- Winning word: demarche
- No. of contestants: 248
- Pronouncer: Alex Cameron

The 73rd Scripps National Spelling Bee was held in Washington, D.C. at the Grand Hyatt Washington on May 31 – June 1, 2000, sponsored by the E.W. Scripps Company.

Twelve-year-old George Thampy, from Saint Louis, Missouri won the competition by correctly spelling the word "demarche." Thampy had taken third place in the prior year's Bee, and fourth place in the 1998 Bee. He also took second place in the National Geography Bee a week before winning the National Spelling Bee. Thampy was the second home-schooled student to ever win the Bee. The first was Rebecca Sealfon in 1997.

Second place went to 12-year old Sean Conley of Newark, California, who missed "apotropaic." He went on to win the next year's Bee. Third place went to 14-year old Allison Miller of Niskayuna, New York, who missed "venire."

There were 248 spellers this year, 138 of whom were eliminated in the first day of competition. The first place prize was $10,000, followed by $5,000 for second, and $3,000 for third place.
