= 71st Scripps National Spelling Bee =

Spelling bee held in the United States in 1998

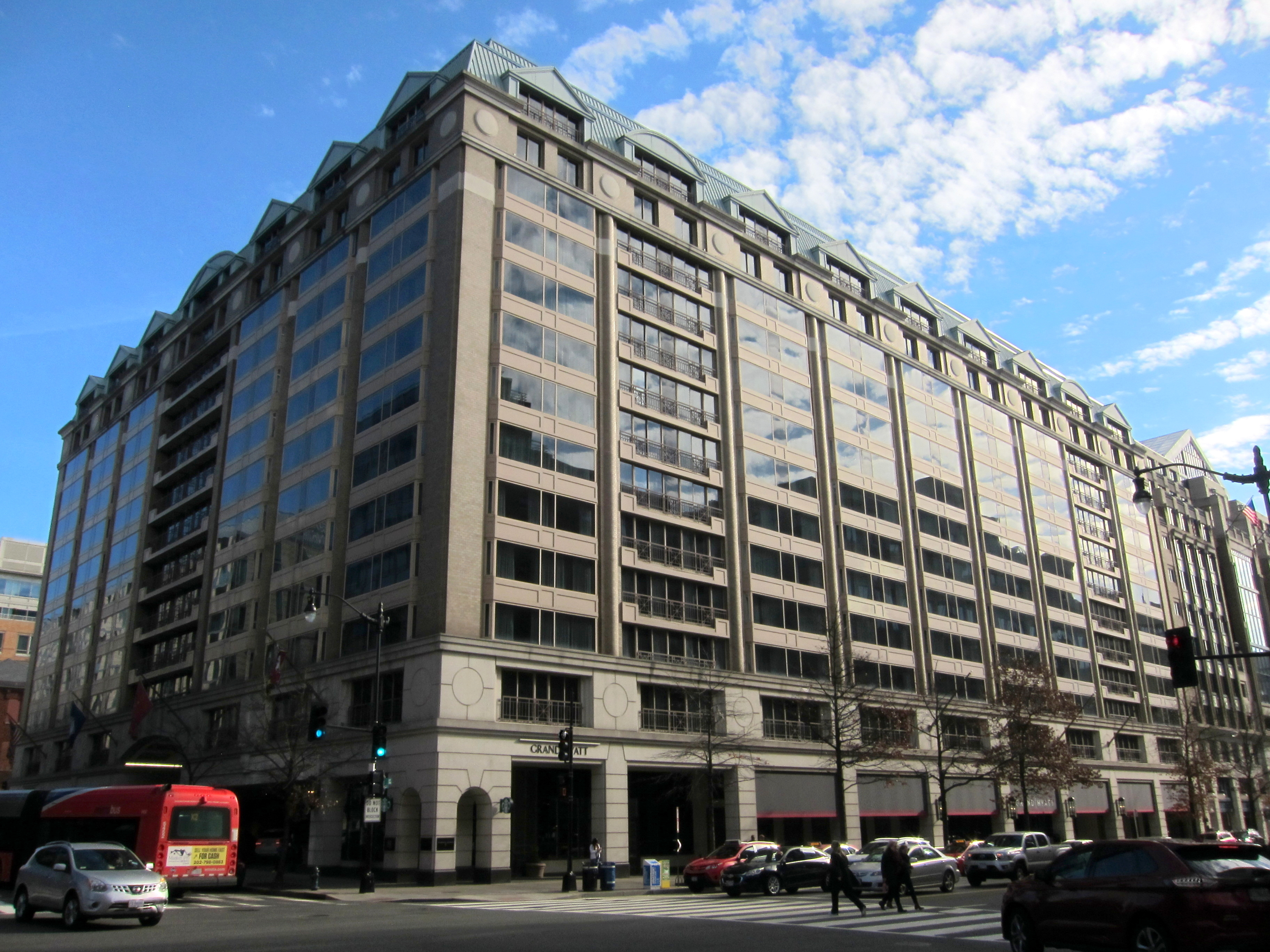
- The Grand Hyatt Washington in Washington, D.C., hosted the Scripps National Spelling Bee.
- Date: May 27–28, 1998
- Location: Grand Hyatt Washington, Washington, D.C.
- Winner: Jody-Anne Maxwell (12 at time of win)
- Sponsor: Phillips & Phillips Stationery Suppliers
- Sponsor location: Kingston, Jamaica
- Winning word: chiaroscurist
- No. of contestants: 249
- Pronouncer: Alex Cameron

The 71st Scripps National Spelling Bee was held in Washington, D.C., on May 27–28, 1998, sponsored by the E.W. Scripps Company.

== Competition ==
Twelve-year-old Jody Anne Maxwell, from Kingston, Jamaica, where she attended Ardenne High School, won the competition by correctly spelling the word "chiaroscurist." Maxwell was the second student from outside of a U.S. state to win, after Hugh Tosteson García of Puerto Rico in the 48th Scripps National Spelling Bee in 1975. Second-place went to 12-year-old Prem Murthy Trivedi of New Jersey, a four-time participant, who also finished second the prior year. Third-place was taken by 13-year-old Hirsh Sandesara of Northbrook, Illinois. Also competing was 12-year-old Versha Sharma from Louisiana, who went on to earn acclaim as a journalist and editor.

There were 249 spellers this year. Eighty-six spellers survived day one of the competition.

The first place prize was $10,000 (among other prizes), doubling the $5,000 top prize in place since 1990.

== Rule change after this year ==
Jamaica was disqualified from the Bee the next year under a new rule that qualifying bees could not occur before February 1. This occurred after complaints that Maxwell had had too much time to prepare, because Jamaica's qualifying bee was over eight months before the National Bee.
