= 72nd Scripps National Spelling Bee =

Spelling bee held in the United States in 1999

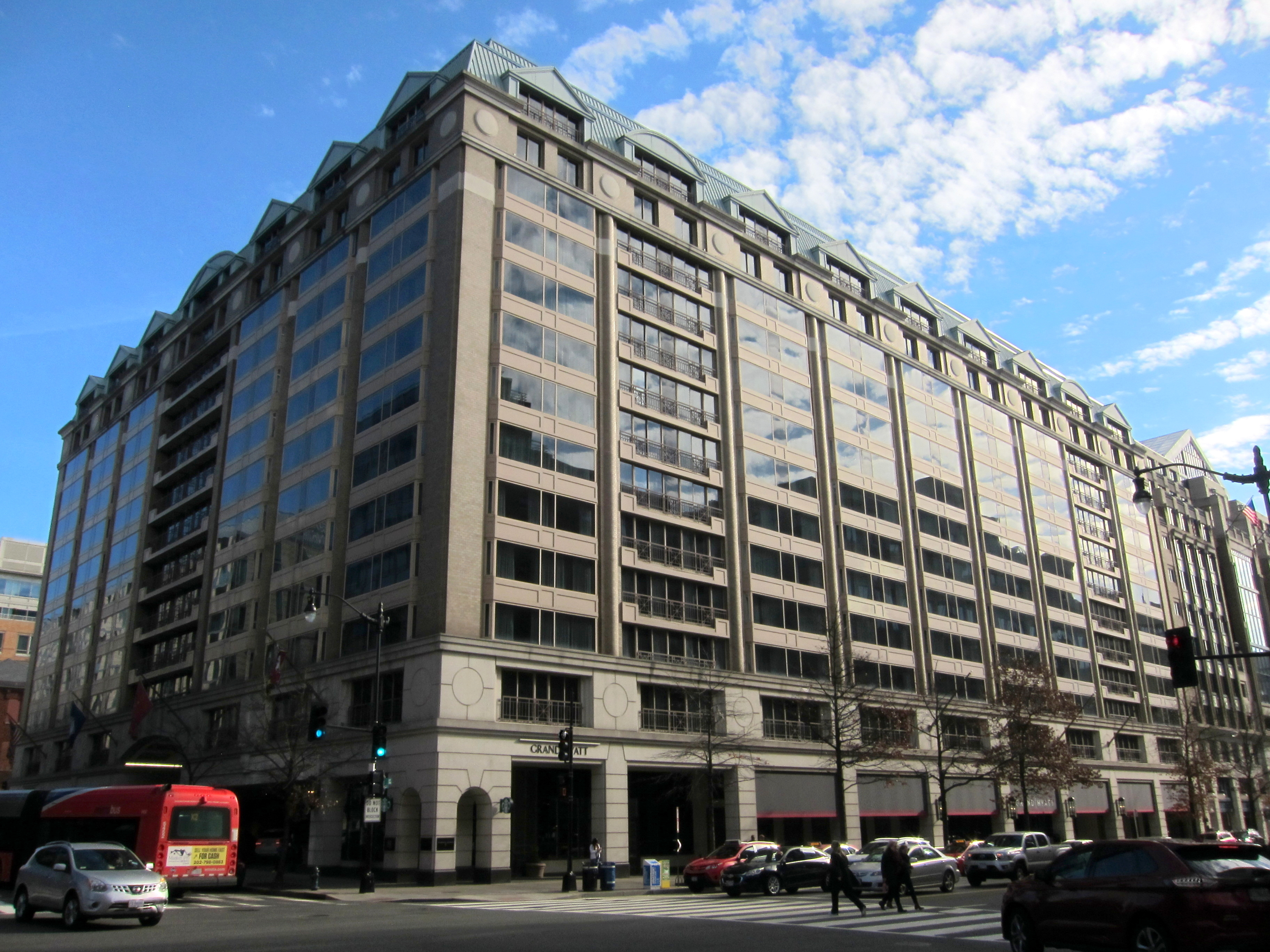
- The Grand Hyatt Washington in Washington, D.C., hosted the Scripps National Spelling Bee.
- Date: June 2–3, 1999
- Location: Grand Hyatt Washington, Washington, D.C.
- Winner: Nupur Lala (14 at time of win)
- Sponsor: The Tampa Tribune
- Sponsor location: Tampa, Florida
- Winning word: logorrhea
- No. of contestants: 249
- Pronouncer: Alex Cameron

The 72nd Scripps National Spelling Bee was held in Washington, D.C., on June 2–3, 1999, sponsored by the E.W. Scripps Company.

== Winners ==
Fourteen-year-old Nupur Lala, from Tampa, Florida, won the competition by correctly spelling the word "logorrhea." Notably, the 1999 Bee was covered by the Jeffrey Blitz documentary Spellbound, which was nominated for the Academy Award for Best Documentary Feature.

Second place went to David Lewandowski, a 14-year old speller from Schererville, Indiana, who placed 39th in the prior year's Bee, and who misspelled "opsimath." Third-place was a tie between 11-year old George Thampy of Maryland Heights, Missouri, (he would win the next year) who missed "kirtle," and 13-year old April DeGideo of Ambler, Pennsylvania, who missed "terrene."

== Competition and new rules ==
There were 249 spellers this year, ages 9–15. Thirty-three were eliminated in the first round, which began on June 2, followed by 10 in the second round, and 36 in the third round. Fifty-five spellers were eliminated in the fourth round, and 105 contestants made it to the second day of competition.

A new policy this year tried to encourage faster spelling, with 90 seconds for easier words on the first day, and two minutes for harder words in the later rounds, though the judges had some flexibility in applying the limits. The policy was adopted after reviewing time and round statistics for six prior years and finding a trend of spellers using more time.

Although Jamaica's contestant had won the prior year, the second student outside the United States to ever win the bee, Jamaica was excluded from this year's bee under a new rule that all qualifying bees could not occur before February 1, to allay concerns that some spellers could get a greater head start on preparing for the national bee. This caused a fair amount of controversy, with public figure such as Jesse Jackson calling the change "exclusionary".

Lala won $10,000 and other prizes for her first place showing. Lewandowski received $5,000.

== See also ==
- Spellbound (2002 film), based on the 1999 Bee.
