= Spellbound (2002 film) =

2002 documentary film by Jeffrey Blitz

- Theatrical release poster
- Directed by: Jeffrey Blitz
- Written by: Jeffrey Blitz
- Produced by: Jeffrey Blitz; Sean Welch
- Starring: Harry Altman; Angela Arenivar; Ted Brigham; April DeGideo; Neil Kadakia; Nupur Lala; Emily Stagg; Ashley White
- Cinematography: Jeff Blitz
- Edited by: Yana Gorskaya
- Music by: Daniel Hulsizer
- Distributed by: ThinkFilm
- Release date: 2002
- Running time: 97 minutes
- Country: United States
- Language: English

Spellbound is a 2002 American documentary that was directed by Jeffrey Blitz. The film follows eight competitors in the 1999 Scripps National Spelling Bee. The film received positive reviews and won several awards, including a nomination for the Academy Award for Best Documentary Feature.

== Overview ==
The film covers eight spellers before, during, and immediately after their competition in the spelling bee. In order of appearance, they are:

=== Angela Arenivar ===
Angela Arenivar of Perryton, Texas represented the Amarillo Globe-News in the 1998 and 1999 bees, winning the latter with the word "crocodilian". She was eliminated in the third round of the 1999 Bee, with the word "heleoplankton". Arenivar graduated from Texas A&M University in 2007 with a bachelor's degree in Spanish and earned a master's in Spanish from the University of New Mexico in 2009. She has taught Spanish in Texas public high schools. Arenivar now attends Texas A&M University pursuing her Ph.D. in Hispanic Studies.

=== Nupur Lala ===
Nupur Lala was the champion of the 1999 Scripps National Spelling Bee (as speller # 155), spelling "logorrhea" to win. She turned down an MTV reality show that would have followed her college years. In 2003, Lala entered University of Michigan at Ann Arbor to study brain and cognitive sciences and pre-medical studies and graduated in 2007 with a degree in Brain, Behavior and Cognitive Science. In the fall of 2014 she entered the College of Medicine at the University of Arkansas for Medical Sciences. She also appeared in the 2020 documentary Spelling the Dream.

=== Ted Brigham ===
Ted Brigham was speller # 1. He represented the Rolla Daily Record of Rolla, Missouri, winning with the word "mayonnaise". One of the more notable stories from his experience is the congratulations posted by students on the marquee in front of his high school in which "champ" was misspelled (presumably as an ironic joke) as "chapm". Ted misspelled "distractible" in the second round, becoming the first of the eight spellers eliminated. Brigham was engaged to be married, and attended medical school in Kansas City, Missouri until his death in December 2007. His family chose not to publicly disclose the circumstances of his death.

=== Emily Stagg ===
Emily Stagg (speller # 148) was sponsored by the New Haven Register in New Haven, Connecticut. Stagg was eliminated in the first round (third overall) in the 1997 Bee, before placing 10th in the 1998 Bee; as a result, she was considered a favorite to win the Bee alongside George Thampy. Stagg spelled seguidilla, disclaimant, kookaburra, viand, apocope, and brunneous, before misspelling clavecin (spelled incorrectly as "clavison") to come in 6th place. In 2006, as a junior in Carleton College, she wrote an op-ed article for the New York Times questioning the usefulness of the National Spelling Bee. As of 2015, Stagg works as a psychiatric nurse in Connecticut.

=== Ashley White ===
Ashley White (speller 149) represented The Washington Informer in Washington, DC in the spelling bee, spelling "lycanthrope" in the first round before misspelling "ecclesiastical" in the third round. Following White's teenage pregnancy (she was 18), a marketing consultant who had seen the movie managed to rally support from other viewers of the documentary to help White into Howard University. She would go on to receive a master’s degree in social work from Howard. The proctor of the Washington Informer regional spelling bee featured in the film is Mac McGarry.

=== Neil Kadakia ===
Neil (as speller # 139) from San Clemente, California, was sponsored by the Orange County Register. He is the younger brother of Shivani Kadakia, who came fifth in the 1997 Bee and was herself interviewed for the documentary. Kadakia's grandfather paid 1000 people in India to pray for him during the Bee. He missed "hellebore" as "helebore" in the bee to get ninth place. Other words Kadakia spelled include: encephalon, desecration, mercenary, Darjeeling, and hypsometer. Kadakia would go on to graduate from UC Berkeley. On July 3, 2011, he married Archana Sheth, also a UC Berkeley graduate. Kadakia is currently an executive for Greens Global, a real estate company based out of San Clemente. He is also an avid chess player, and has earned over 15 chess trophies in his life.

=== April DeGideo ===
April DeGideo, who lives in Ambler, Pennsylvania, participated in the 1998 and 1999 bees, representing the Times Herald of Norristown, Pennsylvania. DeGideo tied with George Thampy for third, misspelling the word “terrene”. Later, she graduated in 2007 from New York University with a degree in Journalism. She then went on to get a second degree in creative writing and later went on to publish two books. The study guide, and Where to start.

=== Harry Altman ===
Many critics who reviewed Spellbound singled out Altman (speller # 8) as its most interesting "character". Roger Ebert wrote that he "has so many eccentricities that he'd be comic relief in a teenage comedy... He screws his face up into so many shapes while trying to spell a word that it's a wonder the letters can find their way to the surface." He spelled "cephalalgia" in the first round and "odyssey" in the third. In a prolonged clip, Altman was eliminated in the fourth round, on the word "banns", which he spelled "bands". He later appeared in the 2001 Bee, but was again eliminated in the fourth round. Altman went to the Academy for Engineering and Design Technology (now Bergen County Academies) in Hackensack, New Jersey. In autumn 2005, he enrolled in the University of Chicago. In 2014, Altman completed a PhD in Mathematics from the University of Michigan, focusing on integer complexity. As of 2025, Altman is involved in the New York rationalist community.

=== Other notable spellers ===
- George Thampy was speller # 245 in the bee and was mentioned several times within the film. Having previously become famous for the 1998 Bee, where he placed fourth, he misspelled "kirtle" as "curtle" for third place, tying with April DeGideo. Thampy eventually won the 2000 national bee.
- David Lewandowski finished second place in the spelling bee, spelling "opsimath" as "opsomath". After David's mistake, Nupur spelled "logorrhea" to win the competition.
- Allyson Lieberman was originally slated to be featured as one of the spellers in the documentary, but her clips were ultimately left out of the film; the scene involving her can be found in the special features of the DVD. The youngest contestant in the entire 1998 bee, she misspelled "purblind".
- Frances Taschuk and Ann Foley are shown in the final set of scenes prior to the last round of the spelling bee. Frances misspells "acoelous" and Ann "quinquevir".
- Vinay Krupadev is in a scene involving Harry's mother feeling "sorry for the boy from Texas who got 'yenta'". She was referring to Vinay, who is actually from Marietta, Ohio, and his pronunciation of "yenta," shown in the film. He eventually spelled it "yente".
- Jess Altman was mentioned in a scene by Harry Altman for being a terrific speller and that he was disappointed she didn't make the Nationals.

=== Other notable interviewees ===
- Frank Neuhauser, winner of the 1st Scripps National Spelling Bee, held in 1925, also appears in the film.
- Alex Cameron, the official pronouncer of the Bee.
- Jonathan Knisley, winner of the 1971 Bee.

== Release ==
Spellbound was given a limited release by ThinkFilm.

== Reception ==
Spellbound opened to positive reviews from critics. Rotten Tomatoes gives the film an approval rating of 97%, based on reviews from 139 critics, and an average rating of 8.27/10. The website's critical consensus states, "A suspenseful, gripping documentary that features an engaging cross section of American children". Metacritic gives the film a weighted average score of 80% based on reviews from 34 critics, indicating "generally favorable reviews".

=== Awards ===
The film was nominated for the Academy Award for Best Documentary Feature; Yana Gorskaya's editing won the ACE Eddie award for best editing of documentary. Spellbound won the News and Documentary Emmy Award for Cultural/Artistic Programming and Jeffrey Blitz was nominated for directing.

In 2007, it was included as #4 of the "IDA's Top 25 Documentaries" of all-time by the members of the International Documentary Association.

== See also ==
- Scripps National Spelling Bee
- Spelling bee
- List of documentaries
- 72nd Scripps National Spelling Bee
