= Dev Shah =

Dev Shah may refer to:

- Dev Shah, main character played by Aziz Ansari on Master of None
- Dev Shah, winner of the 2023 Scripps National Spelling Bee
