= Akash Vukoti =

Child prodigy and spelling competitor

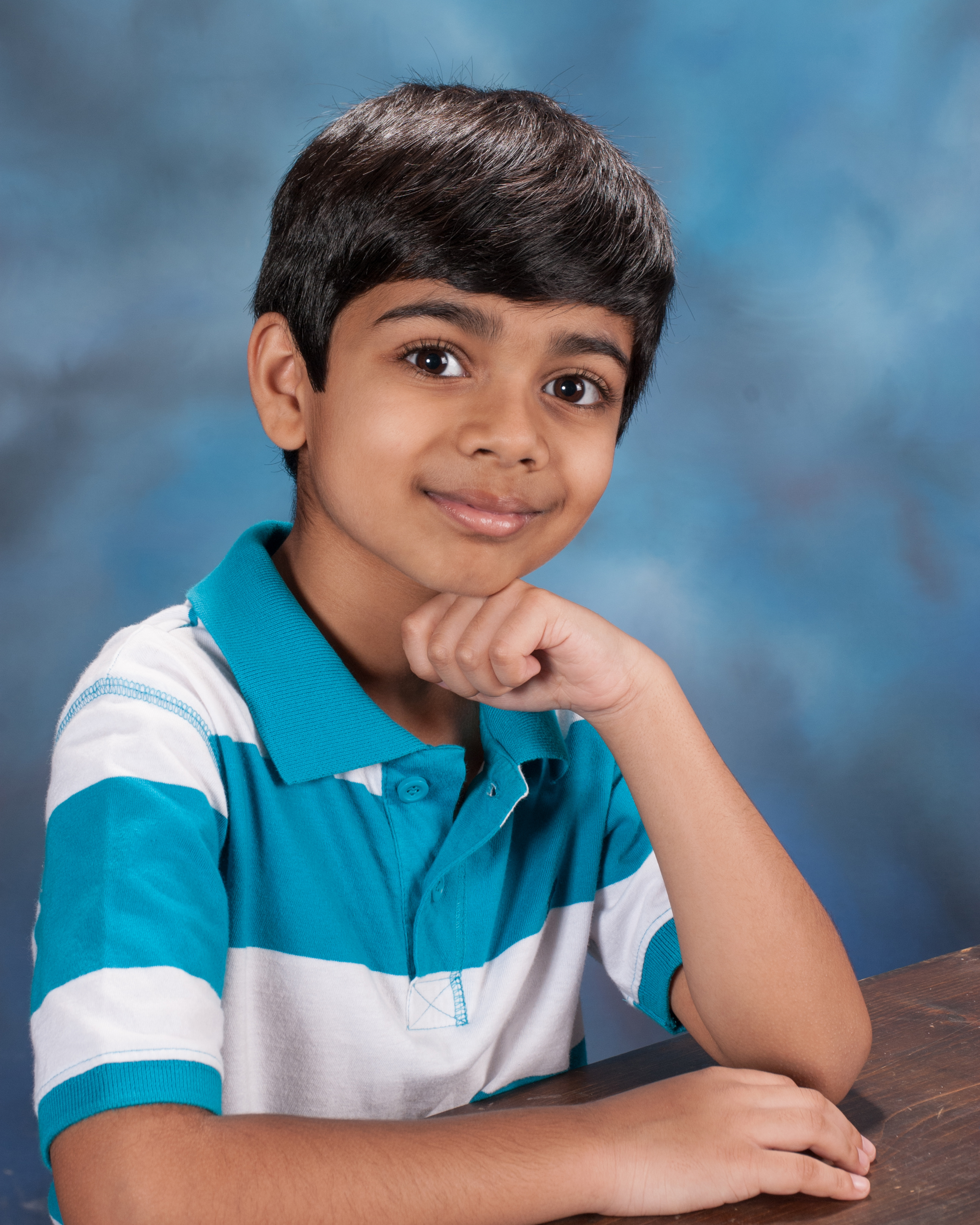
- Born: May 29, 2009 (age 17); Rockville, Maryland, U.S.
- Years active: 2012–present

YouTube information
- Channel: Akash Vukoti
- Genres: Educational; Inspirational
- Subscribers: 1.07 million
- Views: 207.7 million
- Last updated: 8 December 2025
- Website: akashvukoti.com

Akash Vukoti (born May 29, 2009) is an American child prodigy, TV personality, and motivational speaker from San Angelo, Texas. He competed for a record 6 times at the Scripps National Spelling Bee and was the first-ever first grader to compete in the bee. His first television appearance was in the NBC TV show Little Big Shots with Steve Harvey in March 2016.

== Academic achievements ==
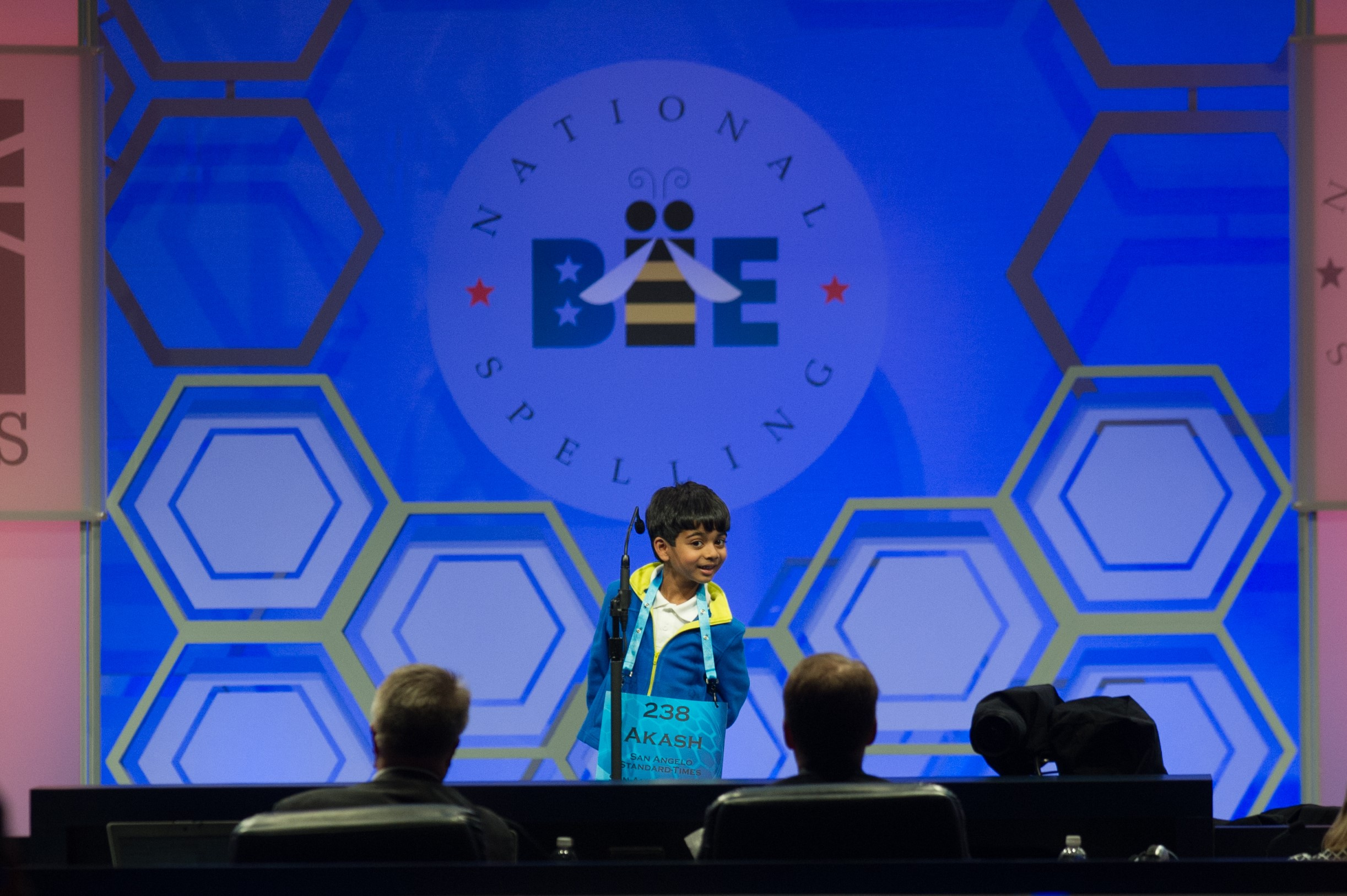
Akash competing at the 2016 Scripps National Spelling Bee

Vukoti competed in his first spelling bee when he was 2 years old. He was inducted into American Mensa at the age of 3 and became a Davidson Young Scholar at the age of 5. He became the first-ever first grader to compete in the history of the Scripps National Spelling Bee at the age of 6 years, in 2016. He later competed in the 2018, 2019, 2021, 2022, and 2023 Scripps National Spelling Bees. This made Vukoti the only person to compete at the Scripps National Spelling Bee for a record 6 times. He has since written a book about his experiences and strategies to qualify to the National Spelling Bee, titled Spelling Anything. Vukoti currently attends Central High School, where in 2026, he became his school's sole National Merit Scholarship Program Semifinalist; he has also earned perfect scores on both the PSAT/NMSQT and the ACT.

== Television shows & media coverage ==
Vukoti was featured on several TV shows, such as Little Big Shots in Season 1 (2016), Season 2 (2017) and Little Big Shots UK (Episode 4) in 2017. He was also featured on the Steve Harvey talk show, Jimmy Kimmel Live!, and The Preachers in 2016. He appeared as a guest on the Harry show in 2017. Akash was also featured on The Kelly Clarkson Show on November 10, 2020.

On September 25, 2018, Vukoti was announced as one of the celebrities who would compete on Dancing with the Stars: Juniors, a spin-off of Dancing with the Stars.

== Documentaries and films ==
Vukoti has been featured in HBO and BBC documentaries. Episode 231 of Real Sports with Bryant Gumbel titled “Brain Games and Mental Athletes” featured Vukoti and aired on June 21, 2016, on HBO. The BBC documentary The Human Body: Secrets of Your Life Revealed showcased Vukoti's talent in the episode "Learn" and aired on October 9, 2017, on BBC Two.

He was featured in the award-winning documentary film Spelling the Dream.

== Filmography ==
=== Film ===
Year	Title	Role	Network	Ref.
2017	The Human Body: Secrets of Your Life Revealed	Self	BBC	
2020	Spelling the Dream	Self	Netflix	
2026	Can You Use It In A Sentence	Executive Producer	Short Film	

=== Television ===
Year	Title	Role	Channel	Notes	Ref.
2016	Little Big Shots	Self	NBC	Season 1, Episode 1; Aired March 8 Season 1, Episode 9; Top 10 Moments; Aired May 8	
2016	Steve Harvey	Self	Syndication	Aired March 11	
2016	Jimmy Kimmel Live!	Self	ABC	Aired June 2	
2016	Real Sports with Bryant Gumbel	Self	HBO	Brain Games; Aired June 21	
2016	The Preachers	Self	Syndication	Aired July 11	
2017	Little Big Shots UK	Self	ITV	Aired March 29	
2017	Little Big Shots	Self	NBC	Season 2, Episode 7; Aired April 23	
2017	Harry	Self	Syndication	Aired April 27	
2018	Dancing with the Stars: Juniors	Contestant	ABC	Eliminated 7th in the 6th week; Aired October 7 to November 18	
2020	Akashamanta	Self	TV9 Telugu	Television special; Aired January 13	
2020	The Kelly Clarkson Show	Self	Syndication	Season 2; Aired November 10	

== Awards ==
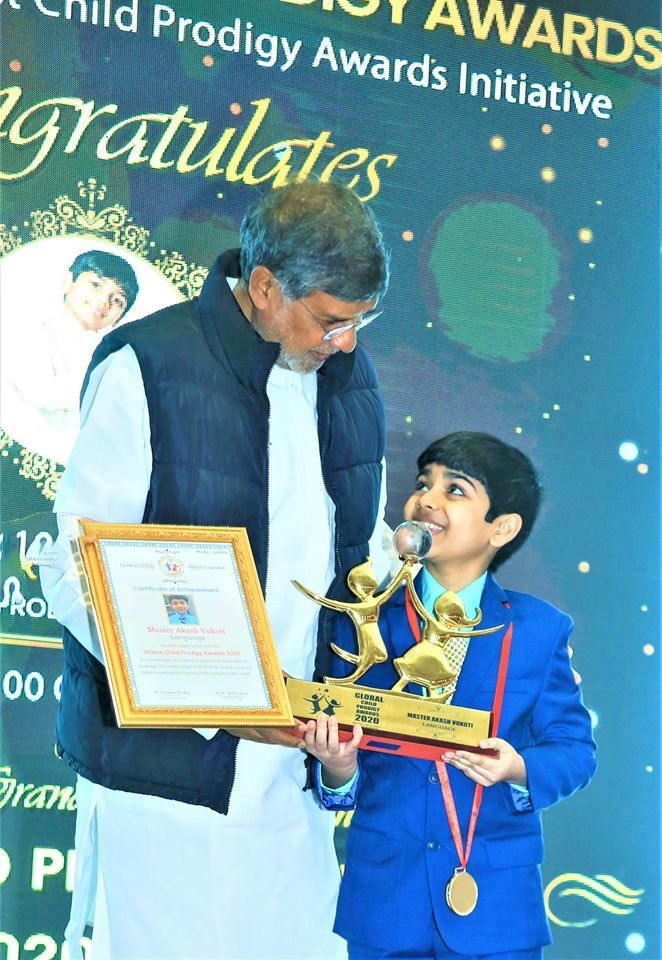
Vukoti receiving the Global Child Prodigy Award from Nobel Peace Prize Laureate Dr. Kailash Sathyarthi

Year	Association	Award	Category	Ref.
2017	Telugu Association of North America	Special Recognition Award	Spelling & Language	
2017	North America Telugu Society	Honorary Title Dhaarana Vaamana	Special Honor	
2020	Global Child Prodigy Awards	Global Child Prodigy Award 2020	Language	

== Personal life ==
Akash Vukoti is the son of Chandrakala Jandyam and Dr. Krishna M Vukoti, who immigrated to the United States from Andhra Pradesh, India. Akash has an elder sister Amrita, who is also a Davidson Young Scholar and a member of Mensa. Both Amrita and Akash Vukoti competed in the 2019 Scripps National Spelling Bee.

== Philanthropy ==
Vukoti has donated to various non-profit organizations like Children's Miracle Network in San Angelo, Wikipedia, Hurricane Harvey Relief Fund, Telangana CM Relief Fund, Water.org and Kerala Floods Relief Fund. He has also donated to Bharat Ke Veer, an Indian government initiative supporting the families of deceased Central Armed Police Forces and Assam Rifles personnel. Vukoti has also donated to non-profit organizations the American Red Cross Society and the Government of India's PM CARES Fund to help fight the COVID-19 pandemic.

In November 2024, Vukoti founded a nonprofit, What Is On My Ballot. His organization aims to improve voter education in the United States and has published brochures to simplify elections in San Angelo, receiving wide local media attention.
