= 70th Scripps National Spelling Bee =

Spelling bee held in the United States in 1997

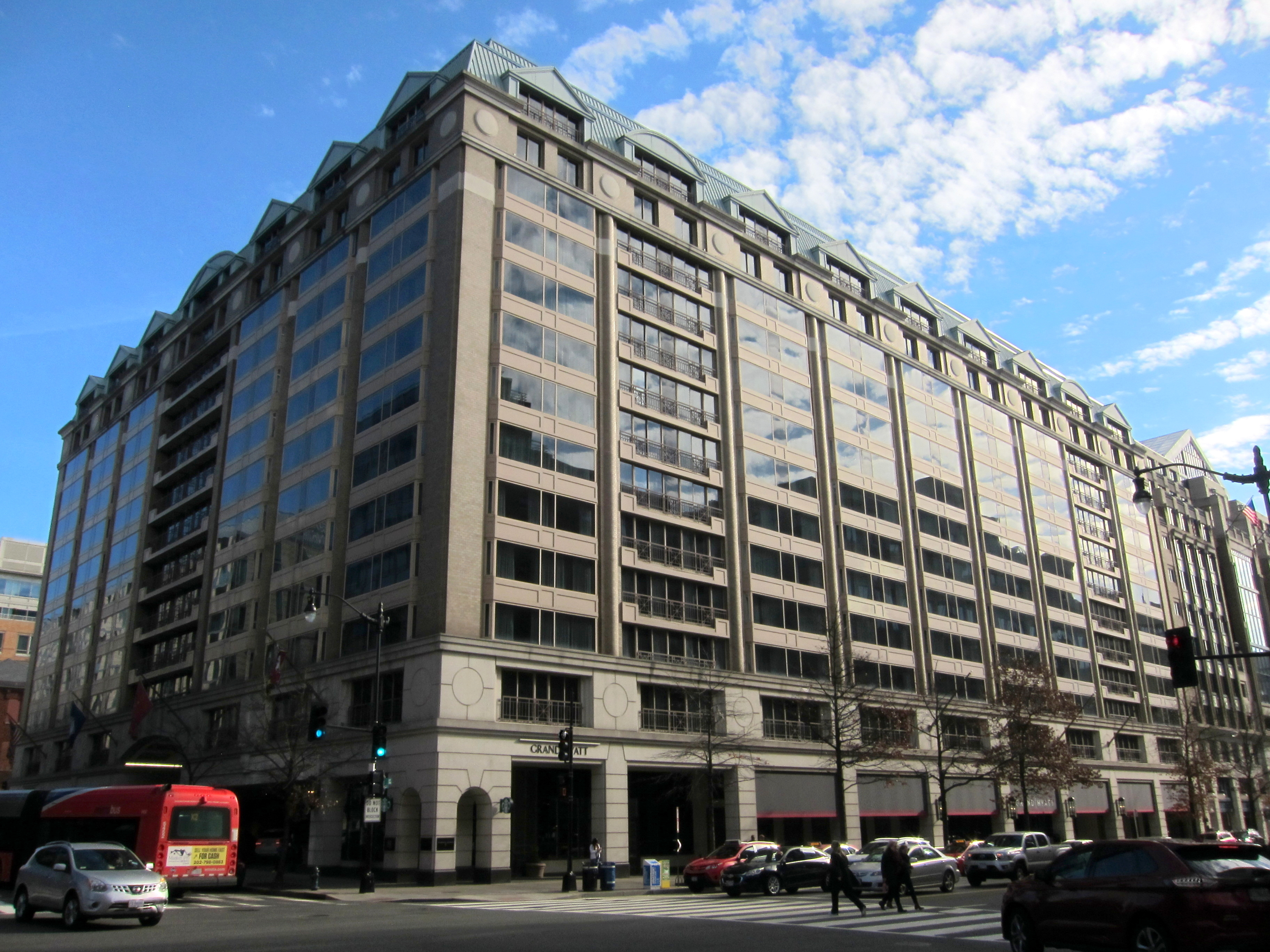
- The Grand Hyatt Washington in Washington, D.C., hosted the Scripps National Spelling Bee.
- Date: May 28–29, 1997
- Location: Grand Hyatt Washington, Washington, D.C.
- Winner: Rebecca Sealfon (13 at time of win)
- Sponsor: New York Daily News
- Sponsor location: New York City
- Winning word: euonym
- No. of contestants: 245
- Pronouncer: Alex Cameron

The 70th Scripps National Spelling Bee was held in Washington, D.C., on May 28–29, 1997, sponsored by the E.W. Scripps Company.

Thirteen-year-old Rebecca Sealfon, from Brooklyn, New York, won the competition in the 22nd round by correctly spelling the word "euonym". Sealfon's exclamation while spelling her final, winning word has been called one of the most notable moments from National Spelling Bee history, a "made-for-YouTube" moment. Sealfon was the first home-schooled student to win the Bee.

Second-place went to 11-year old Prem Murthy Trivedi of Howell, New Jersey, who misspelled "cortile," and third to 13-year old Sudheer Potru of Beverly Hills, Michigan, who was unable to spell "pachymeter" in the 14th round. Sealfon had a chance to win in the 17th round, but missed "dulcinea", causing the final two spellers to continue spelling.

The first place prize was $5000 (as it had been since 1990), with $4000 for second place and $2500 for third.

There were 245 spellers this year, age 9 (three spellers) to age 15. 17 were home-schooled, and about one-fourth attended private or parochial school. Six spellers were making a third appearance at a national bee, and 42 were second-time participants. 116 survived into the second and final day of competition.
