= Zaila Avant-garde =

2021 Scripps National Spelling Bee winner

- Born: 2006 or 2007 (age 19–20); Harvey, Louisiana, U.S.
- Education: University of Maryland, College Park
- Occupations: Speller, basketball player, juggler

Zaila Avant-garde is an American speller, basketball player, and juggler. She won the 2021 Scripps National Spelling Bee. She is the first African-American contestant to win the bee and is the second Black winner, after Jamaica's Jody-Anne Maxwell.

== Life ==
Avant-garde was born in Harvey, Louisiana, the daughter of Alma Heard and Jawara Spacetime. Her father chose her last name to honor John Coltrane. She has cited Malala Yousafzai, Serena Williams, and Coco Gauff as inspirations. Her basketball heroes include Stephen Curry, James Harden, Diana Taurasi, Kevin Durant, and Maya Moore. In 2025, she began studying cell biology and molecular genetics at the University of Maryland. Her younger brother, Zwe Spacetime, was a finalist in the 2026 Scripps National Spelling Bee.

=== Spelling bee ===
Avant-garde reached the national level in the 2019 Bee. Her coach was former Scripps finalist Cole Shafer-Ray, who also coached the runner-up, Chaitra Thummala. In the 2021 competition, she won the title by correctly spelling "Murraya". The first place comes with $50,000 in cash and prizes. Due to pandemic concerns, only the 11 finalists competed in person, in a session that took fewer than 2 hours. She is the first African-American contestant to win the Scripps National Spelling bee, competition. Before her, MacNolia Cox became the first African-American contestant to reach the final stage in the 1936 Bee, and Marie Bolden had won the first-ever national spelling bee in the United States in 1908.

=== Basketball ===
Basketball, I'm not just playing it... I'm really trying to go somewhere with it. Basketball is what I do. Spelling is really a side thing I do. It's like a little hors d'oeuvre. But basketball's like the main dish.

— Zaila Avant-garde

She is one of the top class of 2026 basketball prospects in the US. Avant-garde is the holder of three basketball Guinness World Records and co-holder of another. Her parents gave her a copy of the Guinness book for her eighth birthday, which triggered her ambition.

On November 14, 2019, she broke her first record, for most bounce juggles in one minute (three basketballs) at 231. That day she also set the record for most bounces of four basketballs in 30 seconds (307). On November 2, 2020, she set the record for most bounce juggles in one minute, using four basketballs (255). She is the co-holder of the record for most basketballs dribbled at one time (six)—set on January 26, 2021 (equaling Joseph Odhiambo's August 2000 record).

=== Juggling ===
Avant-garde was the silver medalist at the International Jugglers' Association 2020 championship in the Juniors Division (18U). She is an elite unicyclist and can juggle and cycle simultaneously.
