= 48th Scripps National Spelling Bee =

Spelling bee held in the United States in 1975

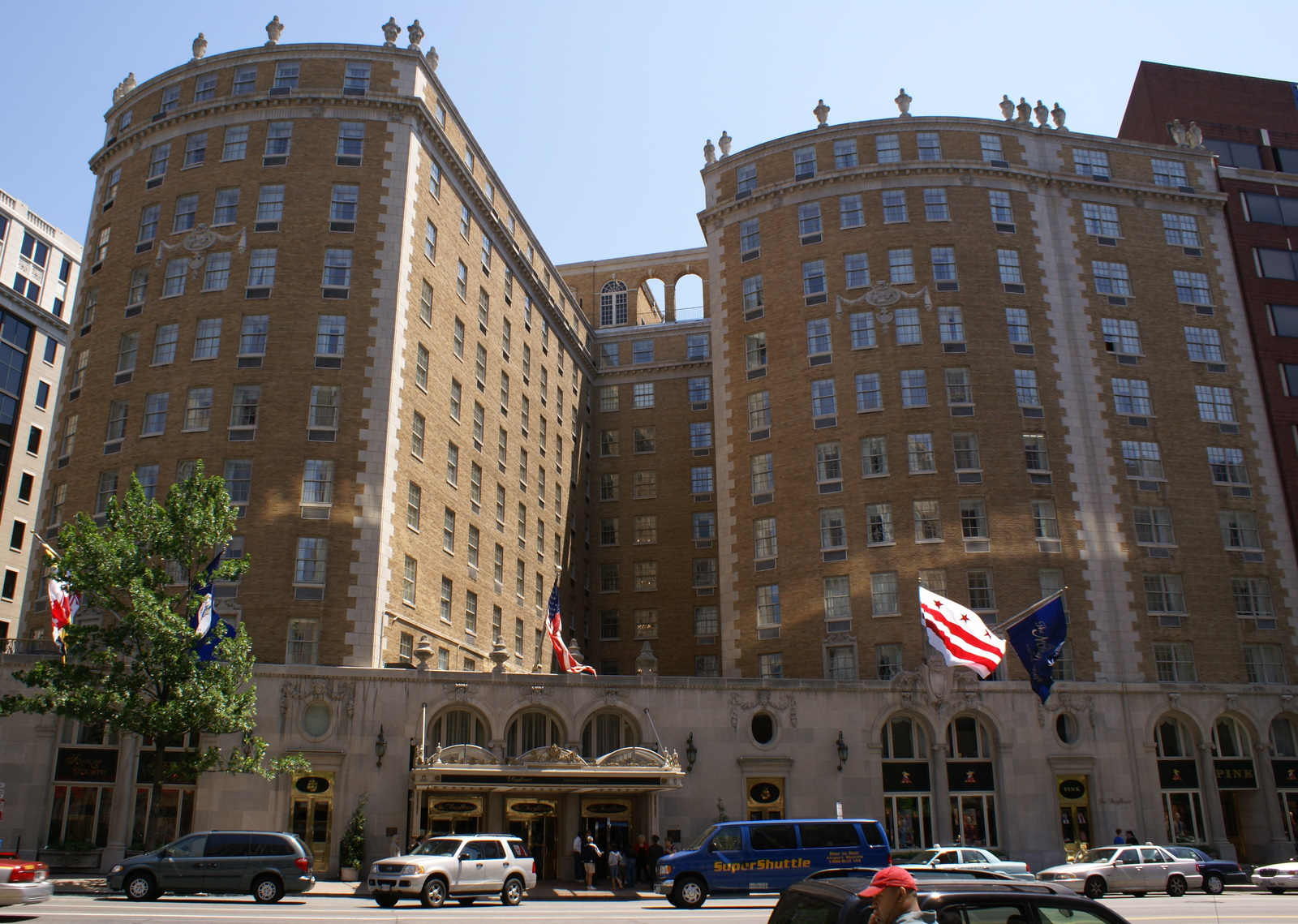
- The Mayflower Hotel, site of the 48th National Spelling Bee
- Date: June 4–5, 1975
- Location: The Mayflower Hotel in Washington, D.C.
- Winner: Hugh Tosteson García (14 at time of win)
- Sponsor: The San Juan Star
- Sponsor location: San Juan, Puerto Rico
- Winning word: incisor
- No. of contestants: 79
- Pronouncer: Richard R. Baker

The 48th Scripps National Spelling Bee was held in Washington, D.C. at the Mayflower Hotel on June 4–5, 1975, sponsored by the E.W. Scripps Company.

The winner was 14-year-old Hugh Tosteson García of Puerto Rico, who correctly spelled "incisor" in the 27th round for the win. Garcia was the first winner from outside the 50 United States, and the only such winner until the 1998 Bee. Second place went to 14-year-old Mark Ogle of Greenwood, Indiana, who missed "brilliantine." Only the two contestants were left after the 20th round.

A total of 597 words were used in the competition, the same as the prior year. There were 79 contestants this year. On the first day of competition, 47 spellers fell out during six rounds of competition which used 400 words, leaving 32 spellers for the final day of competition.
