= Teen Vogue =

American fashion and culture magazine

- Nat Wolff and Charli XCX on the cover of the June/July 2015 issue
- Editor-in-Chief: Versha Sharma
- Categories: Teen magazine
- Frequency: Quarterly
- Publisher: Condé Nast
- Total circulation: 1,045,813 (2011)
- First issue: January 2003
- Final issue: December 2017
- Company: Advance Publications
- Country: United States
- Language: English
- Website: www.teenvogue.com
- ISSN: 1540-2215
- OCLC: 60618341

Teen Vogue is an American progressive online publication, formerly in print, launched in January 2003, as a sister publication to Vogue, targeted at teenage girls and young women. Like Vogue, it included stories about fashion and celebrities. Since 2015, following a steep decline in sales, the magazine cut back on its print distribution in favor of online content, which has grown significantly. The magazine had also expanded its focus from fashion and beauty to include politics and current affairs. In November 2017, it was announced Teen Vogue would cease in print and continue online-only as part of a new round of cost cuts. Other publications would also follow and go digital, such as InStyle. The final print issue featured Hillary Clinton on the cover, and was on newsstands on December 5, 2017.

On November 3, 2025, publisher Condé Nast announced that Teen Vogue's website would be folded back into the parent Vogue website; this decision was castigated by unions representing its editorial staff. Vogue said the change is "not intended to diminish Teen Vogue", and that, "the title will remain a distinct editorial property, with its own identity and mission."

== History ==
Teen Vogue was established in 2003 as a spinoff of Vogue and led by former Vogue beauty director Amy Astley under the guidance of Anna Wintour with Gina Sanders as founding publisher. Test issues of the magazine had been published since 2000. The magazine was published in a smaller 6¾"×9" format to afford it more visibility on shelves and some flexibility getting into a digest size slot at checkout stands. Teen Vogue's original price was $1.50 (USD)—"about as much as a Chap Stick" media critic David Carr noted—and about half the price of contemporaneous magazines aimed at a similar demographic, like Seventeen and YM. At launch, founding editor-in-chief Astley said that topically, the publication would focus on doing "what we do well, which is fashion, beauty and style." Teen Vogue was the first teen-focused addition to the Condé Nast portfolio, previously focused on adult audiences. The publication began with four test issues, then published six issues in 2003 and ten in 2004. Shiona Turini served as Accessories Director in the 2010s.

=== Leadership and format changes ===
In May 2016, Elaine Welteroth was appointed as editor, replacing Astley when she departed to become editor-in-chief of Architectural Digest. Welteroth's appointment at 29 saw her become the then-youngest editor in Condé Nast's history, and the second African-American. Her appointment came as part of a new leadership team in which she would work closely with digital editorial director Phillip Picardi and creative director Marie Suter.

Teen Vogue suffered from the same sales decline that hit all teen fashion magazines in the new millennium. Its single-copy sales dropped 50 percent in the first six months of 2016. Beginning with the December/January 2017 issue, Teen Vogue began publishing quarterly, cutting back from ten issues per year to four issues per year. The first quarterly issue focused on "young love."

On April 29, 2017, Welteroth was named editor-in-chief of Teen Vogue. On November 2, 2017, it was announced Teen Vogue would cease its print edition and continue as an online-only publication as part of a new round of cost cuts. Welteroth later criticized the move as well as Condé Nast's lack of notice given to staff, stating that her attempts to find a new investor were prohibited by the company.

In January 2018, Welteroth left the magazine, and Picardi was named chief content officer. On February 5, 2018, Samhita Mukhopadhyay joined the masthead as executive editor. In March, Marie Suter left the magazine and Condé Nast. She was replaced as creative director by Erin Hover in April 2018. In August, it was announced that Picardi was also leaving the magazine and Condé Nast. In October 2018, it was announced that Lindsay Peoples Wagner would serve as the editor in chief of Teen Vogue.

Alexi McCammond, a reporter at Axios, had been expected to take over as editor-in-chief on March 24, 2021, but resigned prior her taking on the post when a series of bigoted tweets from her college days came to light. On April 7, 2021, Teen Vogue announced Danielle Kwateng as the publication's new executive editor. On May 10, 2021, Condé Nast announced that Versha Sharma, a managing editor at NowThis, would become Teen Vogue's next editor-in-chief. Sharma was expected to begin on May 24, 2021. Based on her experience at NowThis, Sharma introduced more video content to appeal to young audiences. She also stated her support for improving worker conditions and unionization of the magazine's staff.

As of 2022, Teen Vogue has a "New Hollywood" series, a revamping of their earlier "Young Hollywood" franchise.

=== Online growth ===
According to Business of Fashion, since 2016, Teen Vogue has grown substantially in traffic through its website; in January 2017, the magazine's website had 7.9 million US visitors compared to 2.9 million the previous January. This has been attributed to leadership of digital editorial director Picardi, who joined the team in April 2015, as well as the interest of the whole leadership team—with Suter and Welteroth—in broadening the topics covered. According to the Washington Examiner, quoting numbers by ComScore, Teen Vogue had 8,341,000 unique visitors in May 2017 and 4,476,000 in 2018. 1.7 percent of their May 2018 audience was 17 or younger, 2.6 percent were 18 to 24 years old. The group has made a shift in the magazine to increase its focus on social issues and politics, causing a corresponding growth in web traffic. The politics section has surpassed the entertainment section as the site's most-read section.

Generation Next

Teen Vogue class of 2023 consists of young fashion designers. Teen Vogue Generation Next 2023 is a way to support their careers, help elevate them, and provide mentorship throughout their journey. 100+ designers from all over the United States submitted their work, six people were selected as winners by the panel of judges. Each designer received $1,000.00 and a professional consult with one of the famous judges.

=== Merger with Vogue.com ===
On November 3, 2025, Condé Nast announced that Teen Vogue's website would be folded into that of Vogue itself, while Versha Sharma would depart as the website's editor-in-chief and be replaced by Chloe Malle, Vogue's head of editorial content. Vogue's press release said that the new Teen Vogue would be focused on "career development, cultural leadership and other issues that matter most to young people", and quoted Malle as saying that she was dedicated to "continuing and supporting its point of view and sensibility".

The company's union, Condé United, and the New York branch of NewsGuild-CWA each stated that they "strongly condemn Condé Nast's consolidation plans for Teen Vogue", which they stated had been "clearly designed to blunt the award-winning magazine's insightful journalism at a time when it is needed the most".

== Content ==
=== Fashion ===
Vogue includes a variety of fashion-related articles. Teen Vogue in particular includes a variety of many other topics such as beauty, culture, living, runway fashion, and lifestyle topics. Teen Vogue covers a broad age range, though primary demographics range from 17 to 29 year-olds.

=== Politics ===
According to inaugural beauty editor Karen Jesella, Teen Vogue initially strived to be "apolitical" and tried to create "not not feminist" content.

In December 2016, the magazine published an opinion article by Lauren Duca, the magazine's weekend editor, entitled "Donald Trump Is Gaslighting America." Within weeks, the essay had been viewed 1.2 million times, and on NPR's All Things Considered, David Folkenflik described the essay as signaling a shift in the magazine's emphasis toward more political and social engagement. According to The New York Times, many media observers were "surprised to see a magazine for teenagers making such a strong political statement," although Folkenflik acknowledged he drew criticism for expressing this surprise and at Slate, Mark Joseph Stern argued the essay was consistent with the magazine's record, since the appointment of Welteroth and Picardi, as a "teen glossy with seriously good political coverage and legal analysis, an outlet for teenagers who—shockingly!—are able to think about fashion and current events simultaneously." At The Atlantic, Sophie Gilbert similarly noted, "The pivot in editorial strategy has drawn praise on social media, with some writers commenting that Teen Vogue is doing a better job of covering important stories in 2016 than legacy news publications."

The op-ed, as well as a previous obituary on Nancy Reagan that condemned her lack of action on AIDS, signaled a shift to more political coverage and leftist perspectives in the magazine, which led to friction between the newsroom, advertisers and executives.

=== Sexuality ===
Sexuality has also been a topic in Teen Vogue's expanded focus. On July 7, 2017, the magazine published a column titled, "Anal Sex: What You Need to Know" which author Gigi Engle described as "anal 101, for teens, beginners and all inquisitive folk." The column drew criticism from some parents for what they viewed as content inappropriate to the target audience of teenage girls. In The Independent, J J Barnes also criticized the column as "bizarre" for focusing on male reproductive anatomy rather than female. Teen Vogue's digital editorial director Phillip Picardi defended the column, saying that backlash was "rooted in homophobia".

== See also ==
- List of Teen Vogue cover models
