= DAR Constitution Hall =

Concert hall in Washington, D.C., United States

- U.S. National Register of Historic Places
- U.S. National Historic Landmark
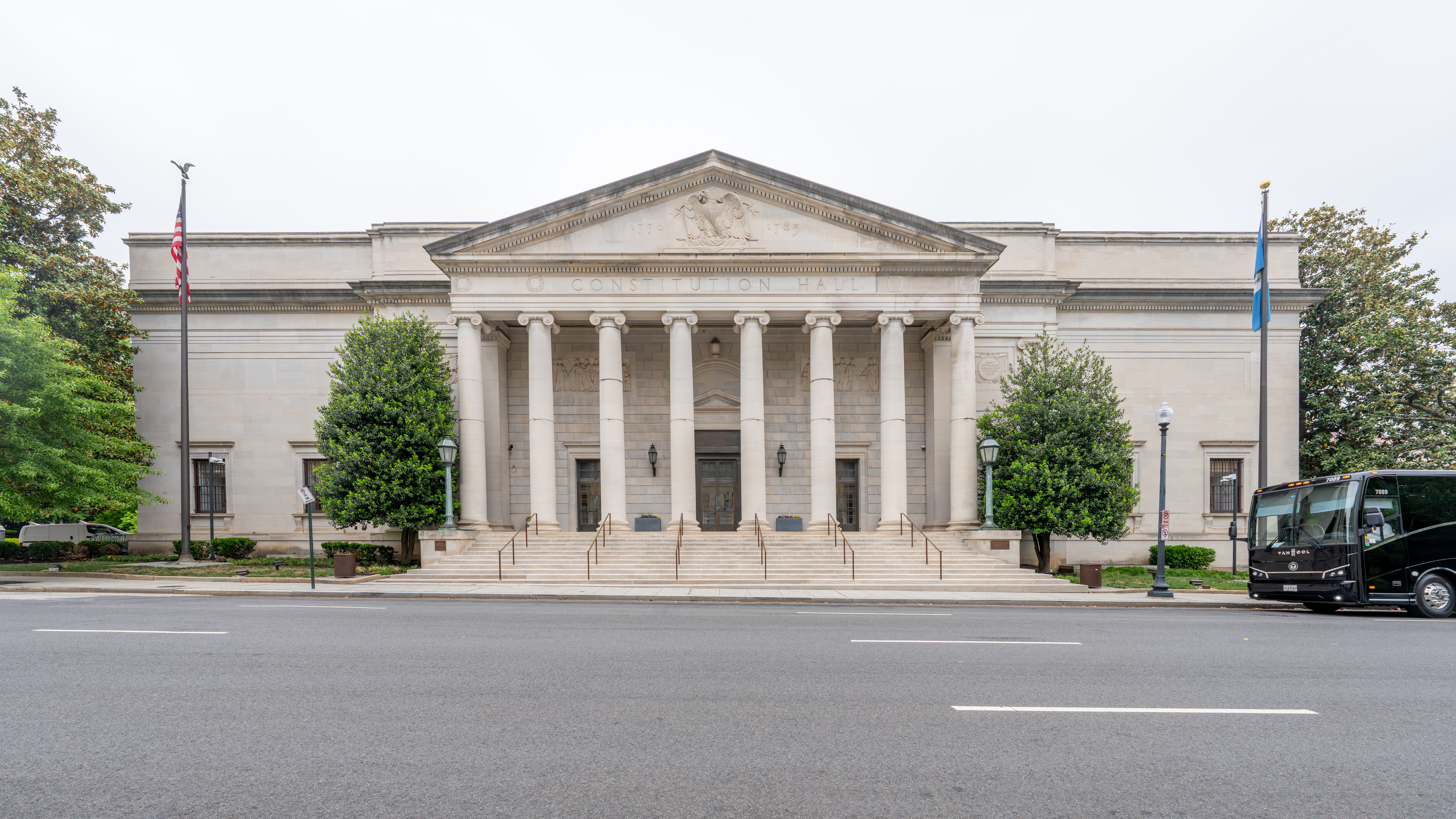
- DAR Constitution Hall in 2026

- Location within Central Washington, D.C. Location within the District of Columbia Location within the United States
- Location: 1776 D Street NW; Washington, D.C.
- Coordinates: 38°53′38″N 77°2′28″W
- Built: 1929; 97 years ago
- Architect: John Russell Pope
- Architectural style: Classical Revival
- NRHP reference No.: 85002724

Significant dates
- Added to NRHP: September 16, 1985
- Designated NHL: September 16, 1985

DAR Constitution Hall is a concert hall located at 1776 D Street NW, near the White House in Washington, D.C. It was built in 1929 by the Daughters of the American Revolution to house its annual convention when membership delegations outgrew Memorial Continental Hall. The two buildings were later connected by a third structure, which houses DAR Museum, administrative offices, and genealogical library. DAR Constitution Hall is still owned and operated by the National Society of Daughters of the American Revolution. It was designated a National Historic Landmark in 1985. It has been a major cultural center of the city since its construction, and houses its largest auditorium.

== Description ==
The hall was designed by architect John Russell Pope, and opened in 1929 at 1776 D Street NW in Washington, D.C., just east of the U.S. Department of the Interior between the headquarters of the American Red Cross and the Organization of American States and across the street from the Ellipse in front of the White House.

The hall seats 3,702 people, including 2,208 in the tiers and 1,234 on the orchestra level. The hall has 52 boxes, each containing five seats, separating the orchestra from the tiers, including one Presidential box.

The Hall is a Neoclassical style structure, faced with Alabama limestone and houses the largest auditorium in Washington, D.C. This auditorium is unusual with its U-shaped balcony, necessary to provide the enormous amount of seating required by the program while retaining practical sight distances. The auditorium holds a three-manual, 40 rank Skinner pipe organ, Opus number 757.

== History ==
=== 20th century ===
An event at the hall in 1930

From 1930 until the opening of the John F. Kennedy Center for the Performing Arts in 1971, Constitution Hall was home to the National Symphony Orchestra and the city's principal venue for touring classical music soloists and orchestras. Some of the earliest mainstream country music concerts were also held there, organized by Connie B. Gay. The National Geographic Society presented sold-out film lectures for over 40 years, filling the hall three evenings a week until about 1990 when they moved to the National Geographic theater near 16th and M Streets, NW. The free Air Force Band Sunday concerts, featuring famous guest artists, are popular, as is the band's special Christmas gala show.

In 1939, during racial segregation in Washington, D.C., the DAR denied African-American opera singer Marian Anderson the opportunity to sing at the Hall, causing First Lady Eleanor Roosevelt to resign her membership in protest. Instead, Anderson performed (with the aid of Eleanor Roosevelt and her husband, President Franklin D. Roosevelt) a critically acclaimed open-air concert on Easter Sunday, April 9, 1939, on the steps of the Lincoln Memorial in Washington, D.C. She sang before a crowd of more than 75,000 people and a radio audience in the millions.

In 1941, Paul Robeson was blocked from performing at Constitution Hall on the grounds of his race. The organization later reversed its racial exclusion policy, and Anderson performed at Constitution Hall for an American Red Cross war relief benefit in 1942 and, in 1953, she performed at the hall as part of the American University concert series. She performed at Constitution Hall again in 1956 and in 1960. In 1964, she chose it as the first venue of her farewell concert tour.

=== 21st century ===
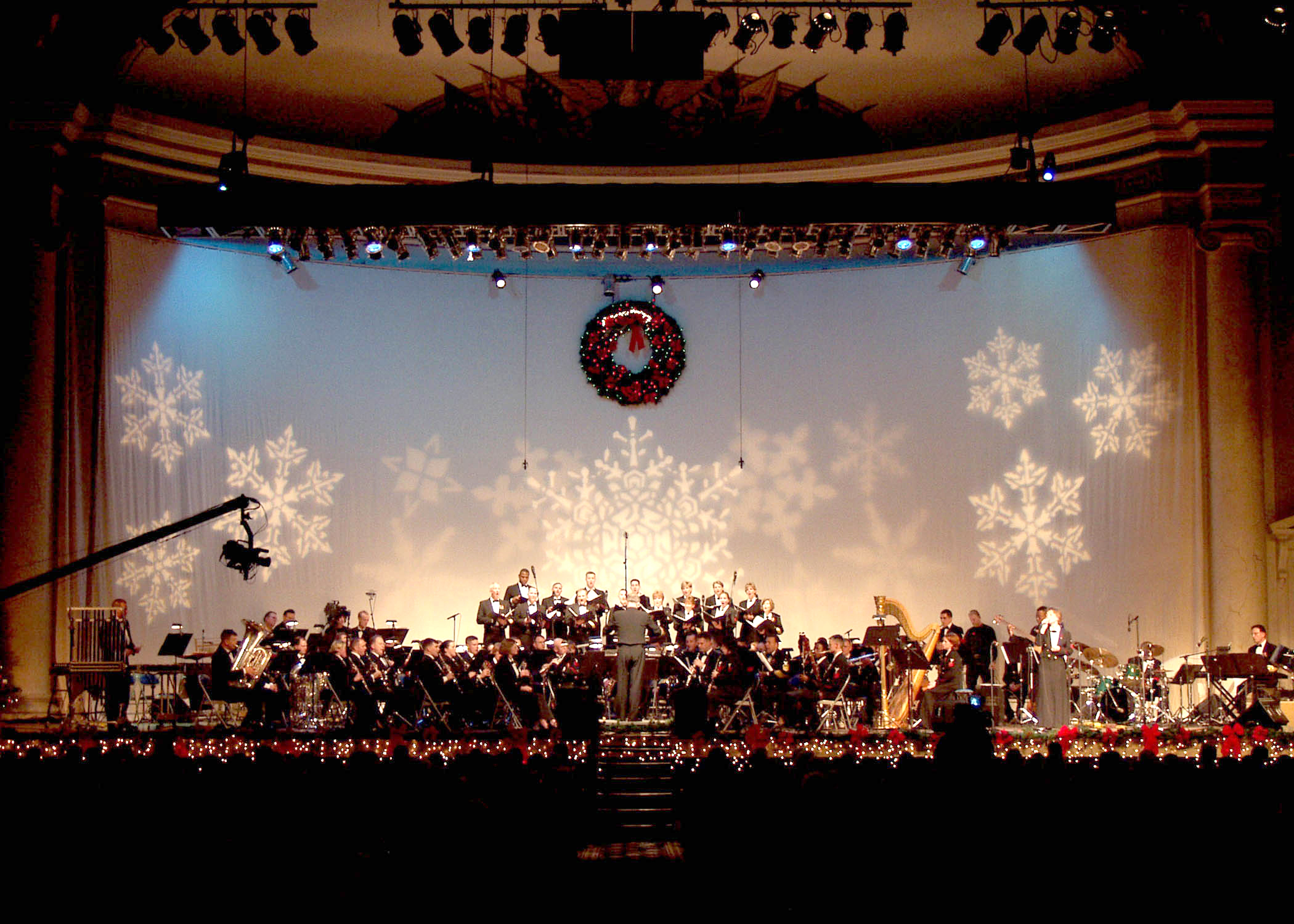
The United States Navy Orchestra performing at DAR Constitution Hall in December 2001

As of 2024, every U.S. president since Calvin Coolidge has attended at least one event at the theater.

In 2026, it was reconfigured to house the Washington National Opera, which had resided at the John F. Kennedy Center for the Performing Arts until Trump's second presidency.

== Notable events ==
The hall has hosted multiple notable educational and entertainment events, including:

- 1939: The hall hosted the global premiere of the movie Mr. Smith Goes to Washington.
- 1983: The hall served as the recording site for Eddie Murphy Delirious, starring Eddie Murphy
- 1983: The hall hosted the OTI Festival 1983
- 1995: The hall hosted the Voters For Choice concerts to promote women's reproductive rights. It was hosted by Gloria Steinem and headlined by Pearl Jam with Neil Young & Crazy Horse.
- 1996: The hall hosted John Denver's Christmas in Concert
- 1997: The hall served as the recording site for Classic Whitney: Live from Washington, D.C., a Whitney Houston album
- 2002: The hall served as the recording location for Martin Lawrence Live: Runteldat
- 2004: Chris Rock's HBO special and album Never Scared were recorded at the hall.
- 2009: Robin Williams' HBO special Weapons of Self Destruction was recorded at the hall.
- 2004, 2005, 2007, and 2008: The hall hosted the annual meetings of the International Monetary Fund and the World Bank Group.
- 2000 and 2001: Episodes of the television game show Wheel of Fortune were recorded at the hall.
- 2000: The Malaysian newscast Buletin Utama was broadcast from the hall.
- 1997, 2004, 2012, and 2016: Episodes of the television game show Jeopardy! were recorded in the hall.
- 2026: the hall became the new venue for the Scripps National Spelling Bee in its 101st year.
- 2026: The hall became the new residence of the Washington National Orchestra.

== See also ==
- List of concert halls
- List of National Historic Landmarks in Washington, D.C.
