= Online News Association =

Association of online journalists

- Abbreviation: ONA
- Formation: 1999
- Type: 501(c)(3) organization
- Purpose: Supporting online journalism
- Headquarters: Washington D.C., US
- Region served: Global
- Members: 3,257 (2023)
- Official language: English
- CEO and Executive Director: LaSharah S. Bunting
- Website: journalists.org

The Online News Association (ONA), founded in 1999, is a 501(c)(3) non-profit organization of digital journalists headquartered in Washington D.C., United States. The founding members first convened in December 1999 in Chicago. The group included journalists from WSJ, Time, MSNBC, and the FT, among other outlets. It is the world's largest association of digital journalists, with more than 3,200 members.

The majority of ONA members are professional online journalists. The association defines "professional members" as those "whose principal livelihood involves gathering or producing news for digital presentation." These include news writers, producers, programmers, bloggers, designers, editors, photographers and others who produce news for the Internet or other digital delivery systems. Other members include journalism educators, journalism students, business development, marketing and communications professionals in the media and those interested in the field of online journalism.

== AI in Journalism Initiative ==
The Online News Association runs the AI in Journalism Initiative, which offers a mix of training, networking opportunities, thought leadership, and other resources for journalists and media executives. Microsoft contributed initial funding for the initiative, which was announced alongside AI-related partnerships with other media groups, including Semafor, the Craig Newmark School of Journalism, and the GroundTruth Project.

== Online Journalism Awards (OJAs) ==
The Online News Association administers the Online Journalism Awards, a set of global awards honoring excellence and innovation in digital journalism. The OJAs focus on independent, community, nonprofit, major media and international news sites. The awards were launched in May 2000, initially as a joint effort of the Online News Association and the Columbia University Graduate School of Journalism. Winners are announced at the annual conference.

Each year features over 20 categories for journalism awards. Examples include awards for excellence in Newsletters, Technology Reporting, Social Media Engagement, Online Commentary and Breaking News. Select categories come with a cash prize, which over the years have been provided by supporters such as the John S. and James L. Knight Foundation, the University of Florida College of Journalism and Communications, SmartNews and others.

From 2017 to 2023, the OJAs honored projects in the Excellence in Immersive Storytelling category. Winning work included journalism by The New York Times, FRONTLINE, The New Yorker and Al Jazeera.

In 2024, the OJAs introduced a journalism award for "Excellence in AI Innovation."

== Online News Association Conference and Awards Banquet ==
The organization holds an annual conference and awards banquet in the U.S., which features four days of training, networking, exhibits, and career exploration. The event revolves around trends and key issues at the intersections of journalism, emerging technology, and leadership.

Past keynote speakers include:

- Evan Williams, Twitter
- Vivek Kundra, Chief Information Officer of the United States in the Obama administration
- Tim Page, AOL CEO
- Vivian Schiller
- Versha Sharma, Teen Vogue Editor-in-Chief
- Maria Ressa, Nobel Peace Prize winner and Co-founder and CEO of Rappler
- Jose Antonio Vargas, Founder of Define American
- Nikole Hannah-Jones, investigative journalist and creator of The 1619 Project
- Danah boyd, Founder of Data & Society
- John Carreyrou, investigative journalist and author of Bad Blood: Secrets and Lies in a Silicon Valley Startup
- Francesca Fiorentini, American journalist, progressive political activist and comedian

== MJ Bear Fellowship ==
Starting in 2011, MJ Bear Fellowships were awarded annually to three promising journalists under the age of 30. In 2019, the program expanded to recognize six fellows each year. The fellowships "identify and celebrate young digital journalists, working independently or for a company or organization, who have demonstrated — through professional experimentation, research or other projects — that they deserve support for their efforts and/or vision."

2023 MJ Bear Fellows:

- Alice Wilder, Producer, American Public Media Group
- Bertin Huynh, Multimedia journalist, BBC News
- Blake Stoner, Founder & Chief Reporter, Vngle Grassroots News Agency
- Laura Anaya-Morga, General Assignment Reporter, Long Beach Post
- Maria Mendez, Service and Engagement Reporter, The Texas Tribune
- Ugur Dursun, Arts Engagement Producer/Reporter, KQED

2022 MJ Bear Fellows:

- Alex Castro, senior social media producer, GMA Network
- Caitlin Hernández, reporter, L.A. Explained, Southern California Public Radio
- Claire Thompson, associate editor, Grist
- Jessica Lee, senior assignment editor, Snopes
- Myrka Moreno, audience engagement producer, The 19th
- Tazeen Pathan, data consultant, Freelancer

2021 MJ Bear Fellows:

- Adriana Lacy, digital and audience engagement editor, Nieman Foundation
- Beena Raghavendran, engagement reporter, ProPublica
- Canela López, health reporter
- Caroline Bauman, community engagement strategist, Chalkbeat
- Jasmine Lee, Freelance
- Natalie Van Hoozer, bilingual reporter and community engagement coordinator, KUNR Public Radio and Freelance

2019 MJ Bear Fellows:

- Abbey Crain, reporter, Alabama.com/Reckon
- Kevin Nguyen, digital producer, Australian Broadcasting Corporation
- Lance Dixon, director, The New Tropic
- Nigel Ndlovu, Freelancer
- Shadab Nazmi, visual data journalists, BBC News/South Asia
- Taylor Blatchford, engagement reporter, The Seattle Times

2018 MJ Bear Fellows:

- Tania Karas, freelance foreign correspondent and editor
- Anand Katakam, manager for data products, Scroll.in
- Vignesh Ramachandran, web producer, ProPublica Illinois

2017 MJ Bear Fellows:

- Mollie Bloudoff-Indelicato, Freelance Reporter and Editor
- Kelly Moffitt, Online Producer, St. Louis Public Radio
- Subhashish Panigrahi, Chapter Development Manager/Asia Pacific, Internet Society

2016 MJ Bear Fellows:

- Alex Laughlin, News Audio Fellow, BuzzFeed
- Rose Eveleth, Producer, 30 for 30 Podcasts, ESPN
- Sohara Mehroze Shachi, Programme Associate, United Nations Development Programme

2015 MJ Bear Fellows:

- Keron Bascombe, Freelancer Writer/Blogger, Trinidad and Tobago
- Nadia Tamez-Robledo, Communication Specialist, Texas Nurses Association, Austin, TX
- Ariana Tobin, Engagement Reporter, ProPublica, New York City, NY

2014 MJ Bear Fellows:

- Anika Anand, Director of Engagement at Chalkbeat, an education news network
- Rajneesh Bhandari, Independent Multimedia Journalist
- Aaron Williams, News Applications Developer, Center for Investigative Reporting (CIR)

2013 MJ Bear Fellows:

- Armie Garde, assistant content editor, multimedia journalist, Sun.Star Publishing, Cebu City, Philippines
- Ashley Lohmann, freelance journalist and associate editor, Fair Observer, San Francisco
- Kyle Stokes, reporter, StateImpact Indiana, a collaboration of WFIU and Indiana Public Broadcasting

2012 MJ Bear Fellows:

- Hagit Bachrach, video producer at the Council on Foreign Relations
- Tricia Fulks, freelance digital journalist; founding story director of "Hollow" interactive documentary
- Denise Hassanzade Ajiri, web writer for Web writer for Radio Farda, Radio Free Europe.

2011 MJ Bear Fellows:

- Lucas Timmons, a data journalist and web producer for The Edmonton Journal
- Laura Amico, the founder and editor of Homicide Watch in Washington, D.C
- Lam Thuy Vo, formerly multimedia reporter for The Wall Street Journal in Hong Kong, now at NPR's Planet Money.

== Miscellaneous ==
From 2011 to 2014, ONA administers a national scholarship program funded by the Associated Press and Google Inc. to foster digital, computer science and new media skills in student journalists.

== See also ==
- Institute for Nonprofit News
- Society of Professional Journalists
