= 74th Scripps National Spelling Bee =

Spelling bee held in the United States in 2001

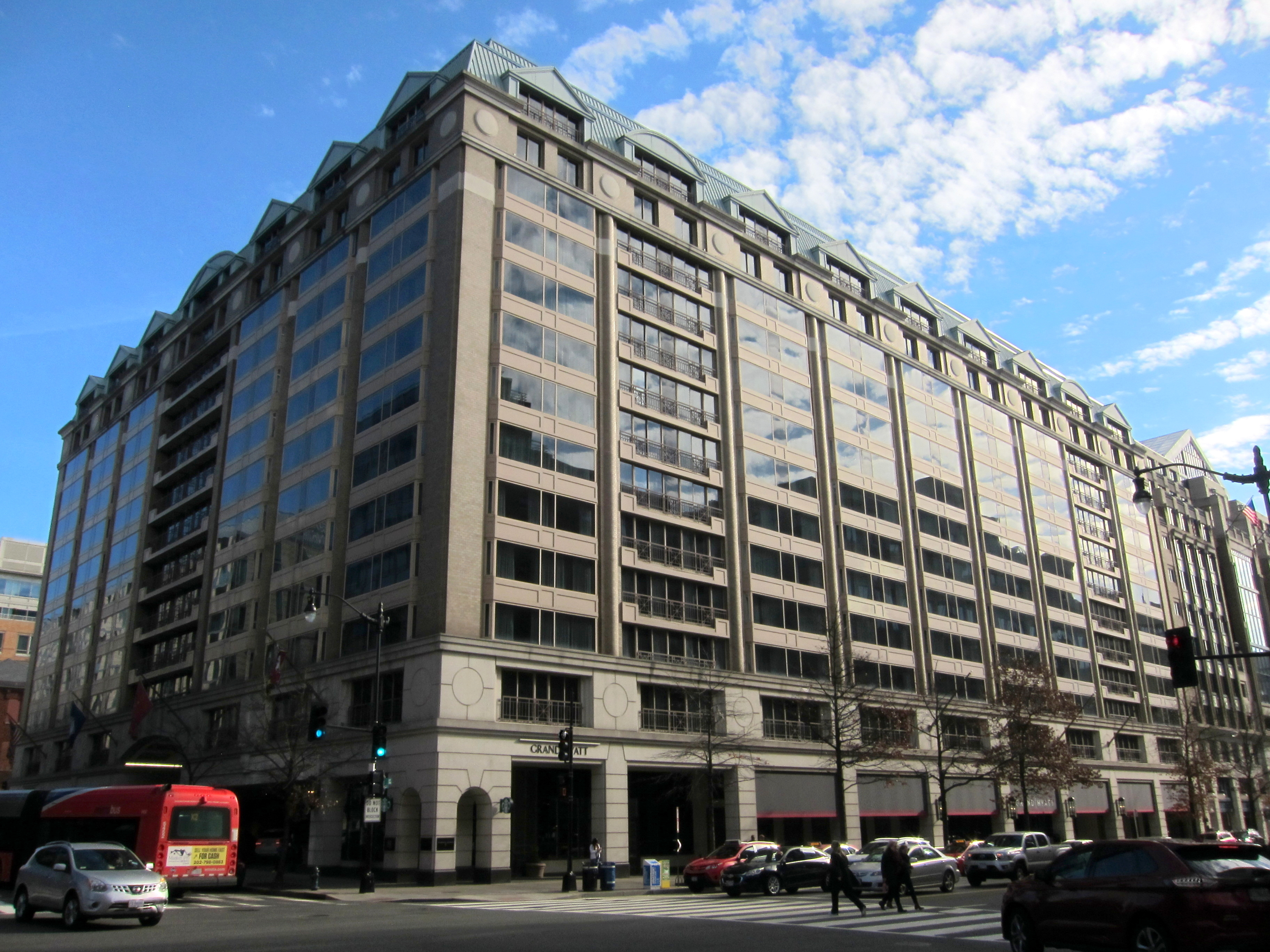
- The Grand Hyatt Washington in Washington, D.C., hosted the Scripps National Spelling Bee.
- Date: May 29–31, 2001
- Location: Grand Hyatt Washington, Washington, D.C.
- Winner: Sean Conley (13 at time of win)
- Sponsor: Aitkin Independent Age
- Sponsor location: Aitkin, Minnesota
- Winning word: succedaneum
- No. of contestants: 248
- Pronouncer: Alex Cameron

The 74th Scripps National Spelling Bee was held in Washington, D.C., on May 29–31, 2001, sponsored by the E.W. Scripps Company.

== Winners ==
Thirteen-year-old Sean Conley, from Anoka, Minnesota, won the competition in the 16th round by correctly spelling the word "succedaneum". Conley was appearing in his third bee. He fell in the sixth round in 1999, and placed second in 2000. Second place went to Kristin Hawkins of Virginia, who missed "resipiscence".

== Competition ==
248 contestants participated in the competition; 138 girls and 110 boys; 170 from public schools, 28 from private schools, 25 from parochial schools, and 25 home-schoolers. Fifty-two spellers had previously participated in a national bee, a new record.

The bee used a three-day format for the first time this year, though bee staff already planned to return to two days the following year by adding a written-test for the first time. The contest began at 4pm on Tuesday May 29, with one-half of the spellers competing in round one starting at 4pm, and the other half at 7pm. 178 spellers survived the first day. Two additional split-rounds continued on Wednesday. The finals, with survivors from both groups, started at 8am on Thursday and were broadcast on ESPN starting at 10am.

The first place prize was $10,000, and second place took $5000.
