= Christmas in Concert =

Live album by John Denver
- Released: September 2001
- Genre: Holiday
- Label: RCA Records
- Producer: Kris O'Connor

John Denver chronology
Christmas (1999)	Christmas in Concert (2001)	Harbor Lights Concert (2002)

Christmas in Concert is a Christmas-themed album of music performed live by American singer-songwriter John Denver. It was recorded at DAR Constitution Hall on December 19 and 20, 1996, and released in September 2001 by RCA Records. It features the World Children's Choir directed by Sondra Harnes, and the National Symphony Orchestra conducted by Richard Kaufman.

== Track listing ==
1. "Christmas for Cowboys"
2. "Christmas, Like a Lullaby"
3. "The Marvelous Toy"
4. "Good Evening Talk"
5. "A Baby Just Like You"
6. "Rudolph the Red-Nosed Reindeer"
7. "Choir Intro"
8. "Away in a Manger"
9. "Jingle Bells"
10. "What Child Is This?"
11. "Intro to Please Daddy (Don't Get Drunk This Christmas)"
12. "Please Daddy (Don't Get Drunk This Christmas)"
13. "Intro to Alfie/The Christmas Tree"
14. "Alfie / The Christmas Tree"
15. "Silent Night"
16. "Living Legend Story"
17. "Noel-Christmas Eve 1913"
18. "Little Drummer Boy"
19. "O Holy Night"
20. "Take Me Home, Country Roads"
21. "Annie's Song"
22. "Calypso"
23. "Intro to Falling Leaves (The Refugees)"
24. "Falling Leaves (The Refugees)"

== Personnel ==
- John Denver – guitars, vocals
- Alan Deremo – bass
- Sondra Harnes – choir director
- Pete Huttlinger – guitar, mandolin, banjo, harmonica, backing vocals
- Richard Kaufman – orchestra conductor
- Chris Nole – piano, accordion, synthesizer
- Michito Sanchez – percussion
- National Symphony Orchestra – orchestra
- World Children's Choir – choir

== Chart performance ==
Chart (2001–2012)	Peak position
US Top Country Albums (Billboard)	60
US Top Holiday Albums (Billboard)	47
