= Reo Eveleth =

American journalist

Reo Eveleth is an American podcast host, producer, designer, and animator. They helped launch and are a producer of ESPN Films' 30 for 30 podcast series, which was a Grand Award Gold Radio Winner in the narrative/documentary at the 2019 New York Festivals Radio Awards, as well as a Bronze Radio Winner in the sports category. 30 for 30 was also nominated for the 2018 Webby Awards in the features and best series categories. Since 2015, Eveleth has become known for their Flash Forward podcast, receiving an MJ Bear Fellowship in 2016.

== Biography ==
Eveleth graduated with a BSc in Ecology, Behavior and Evolution from the University of California San Diego (2010) and went on to earn a masters in Journalism Science (Health and Environmental Reporting) from New York University in 2011.

Eveleth started as a blogger and producer for The Doppler Effect, a weekly science show. They spent five years as the Podcast Editor for Story Collider, a non-profit group dedicated to true, personal stories about science.

In 2013, together with Bora Zivkovic and Ben Lillie, Eveleth co-founded Science Studio, a first-of-its-kind project to collect multimedia stories about science in the manner of annual "year's best" compilations of reported and written stories. From 2015 to 2022, they were a podcast host and producer for Flash Forward, a podcast about possible and not so possible futures.

On the occasion of Eveleth's MJ Bear Fellowship in 2016, the selection committee commented:

"Straddling the bright horizon between science and science fiction, Fast Forward is an engaging and informative podcast about how we live in and imagine the future. As creator and host of this solo project, [Reo] is not just shaping an imagined future, but [their] own. With Flash Forward [they have] shown creativity and flair, packaged with deep reporting, thoughtful engagement, and smart questioning. Most notably, among the gifts [Reo] offers journalism is imagination and a long view into the future."

In 2014, Eveleth was among those who criticized scientist Dr. Matt Taylor’s choice of attire during a progress report on the Rosetta comet mission. Dr. Taylor wore a shirt featuring images of scantily clad women with firearms, which some, including Eveleth, claimed was inappropriate for the occasion and reflective of broader issues of sexism in STEM fields. Eveleth commented on Twitter that the apparel choice was “sexist and ostracizing,” detracting from the scientific achievement. The criticism sparked widespread debate, which concluded with Dr. Taylor issuing a public apology.

In 2019, the Swedish podcasting startup Acast included Flash Forward among the ad-free shows it features for a small charge.

IN 2024, Eveleth hosted the podcast Tested, about sex testing in women's sports, in partnership with the CBC and NPR’s Embedded.

== Awards ==
- 2016, MJ Bear Fellowship from the Online News Association
- 2019, Grant Award Gold Radio Winner, narrative/documentary category, New York Festivals Radio Awards
- 2019, Bronze Radio Winner, sports category, New York Festivals Radio Awards
