= Versha Sharma =

American journalist and editor

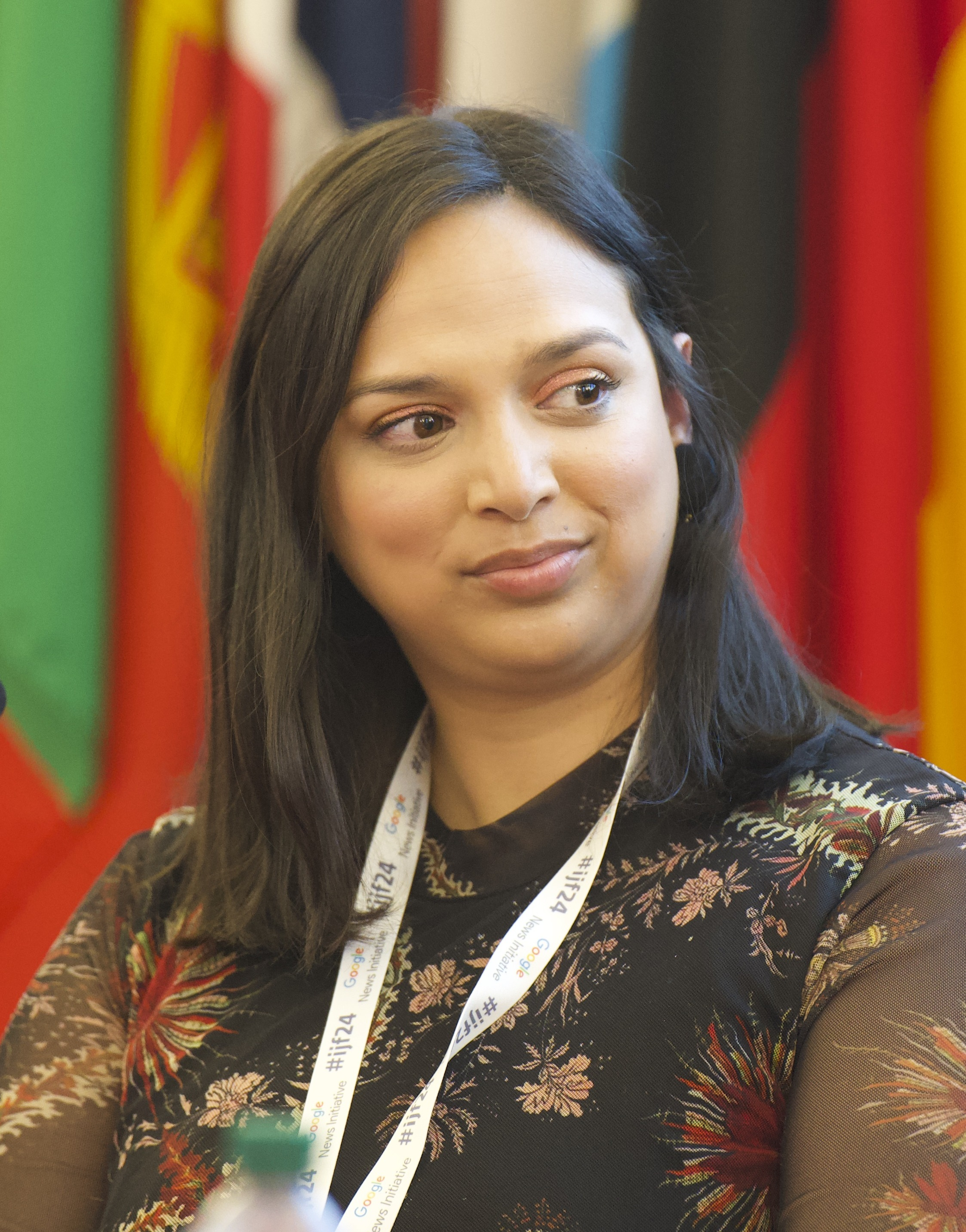
- Sharma at the International Journalism Festival in 2024
- Born: c. 1986; Alexandria, Louisiana
- Education: Centenary College of Louisiana
- Occupations: Journalist; Editor
- Years active: 2009–present
- Employer: Teen Vogue
- Title: Editor in chief
- Awards: Edward R. Murrow Award

Versha Rani Sharma (born c. 1986) is an American journalist and editor. She was editor in chief of Teen Vogue until its merger with Vogue in November 2025. From 2015 to 2021 she was managing editor at NowThis, where she shared in a 2018 Edward R. Murrow Award for a documentary on Hurricane Maria's effects on Puerto Rico. She is on the board of the Online News Association.

== Early life ==
Sharma was born and raised in Alexandria, Louisiana, the daughter of Indian immigrants. She attended Bolton High School, graduating in 2004, then Centenary College of Louisiana in Shreveport, where she studied political science. She graduated in 2008, then worked on Barack Obama's 2008 presidential campaign.

== Journalism career ==
Sharma began working in newsmedia as a writer and editor for Talking Points Memo and MSNBC's Lean Forward. She covered the 2012 United States presidential election for MSNBC's website. In 2015, she became managing editor at NowThis, where she shared in a 2018 Edward R. Murrow Award for her work on a documentary on Hurricane Maria's effects on Puerto Rico. "Puerto Rico: After the Hurricane" won for Excellence in Video in the Large Digital News Organization division.

In May 2021, she was named editor in chief of Teen Vogue. In assuming the role at Condé Nast, Sharma was part of an increase in women's newsroom leadership; Adweek noted she was one of "a dozen women…named editors in chief at some of the most influential publishers in the world" in 2021. CNN also noted her appointment as part of diversifying newsroom leadership that took place in 2021, as she became the first South Asian American to hold the role, and additionally discussed the growing expectations for change to newsroom culture, beyond the new heads. Sharma told CNN that concern for the state of her team was a management priority for her, saying, "I pride myself on being a leader with empathy. Despite the fact that our job is storytelling, a lot of newsroom leaders don't value that or prioritize that."

Sharma is also a member of the board of the Online News Association.

== Personal life ==
Sharma has lived in New York since 2009. She is married to investigative journalist and author Casey Michel.
