= 93rd Scripps National Spelling Bee =

Spelling bee held in the United States in 2021

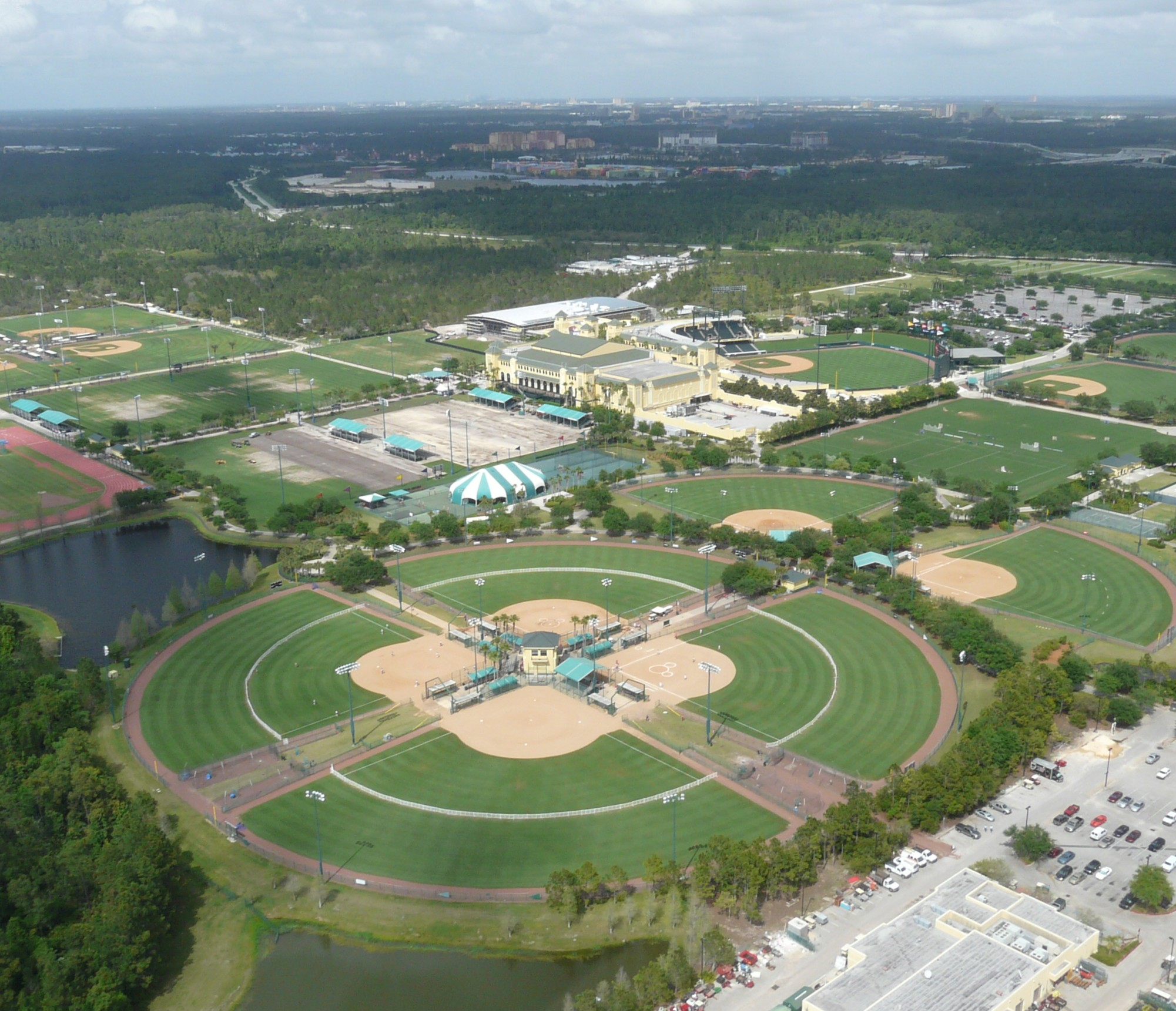
- The ESPN Wide World of Sports Complex in Bay Lake, Florida, hosted the Scripps National Spelling Bee.
- Date: July 8, 2021
- Location: ESPN Wide World of Sports Complex, Bay Lake, Florida
- Winner: Zaila Avant-garde (14 at time of win)
- Winning word: Murraya
- No. of contestants: 209
- Pronouncer: Jacques Bailly and Brian Sietsema

The 93rd Scripps National Spelling Bee was held at the ESPN Wide World of Sports Complex in Bay Lake, Florida. The finals were held on July 8, 2021, and televised on ESPN2 and ESPN. It was won by Zaila Avant-garde, the first African American to win the Scripps National Spelling Bee, and the second black person to do so (after Jody-Anne Maxwell of Jamaica in 1998).

== Field ==
Due to the COVID-19 pandemic, the 2020 spelling bee had been canceled the previous year.

In 2021, the first round was held virtually on June 12 and included 209 spellers from the United States and several other countries. There were eleven finalists: ten Americans and one Bahamian, the first from his country to make it to the finals.

== Competition ==
Jill Biden, the First Lady of the United States, attended in person. She previously attended back in 2009.

The competition went 18 rounds in total. The third-to-last speller was eliminated in round 14 after misspelling athanor, a type of alchemical furnace. Avant-garde and the runner-up, Chaitra Thummala, then competed head-to-head for three rounds. In the last of these, Thummala misspelled neroli oil, giving Zaila Avant-garde the opportunity to spell murraya correctly for the victory.

Avant-garde is the second black person to win the competition, after Jody-Anne Maxwell of Jamaica, who remains the only person not from the United States to do so.

== New rules ==
Following the 2019 final where eight players tied at the end of the competition, a second list of championship words was added for a tiebreaking round. When the tiebreaking round is used after all championship words have been exhausted, or the round concludes after 1 hour, 55 minutes of the televised broadcast, remaining contestants, in numerical order, spell the list of championship words in 90 seconds. They can still ask for definition, language of origin, part of speech, alternate pronunciations, and the use in a sentence, but that will be part of the 90-second period. The contestant who spells the most words correctly in the spell-off round will be declared champion, with a tiebreaker of greater percentage of correctly spelled words in the round will determine the winner. A tie may still exist if the percentage is identical. However, in the actual final, the round was not used, as the Bee did not run overlong.

== Word list championship round ==
- trophallactic
- phylloxera
- trochiline
- platylepadid
- gewgaw
- rolamite
- archedictyon
- euxinic
- torticollis
- heliconius
- Shedu
- batrachian (word meaning)
- aphyllous (word meaning)
- dysphotic (word meaning)
- saxicolous (word meaning)
- nematode (word meaning)
- bathyal (word meaning)
- ambystoma
- theodolite
- ancistroid
- chrysal
- cloxacillin
- regolith
- psychagogic
- duchesse
- thanatophidia
- athanor
- depreter
- consertal
- fidibus
- haltere
- Nepeta
- fewtrils
- retene
- neroli oil
- Murraya

== See also ==
- List of Scripps National Spelling Bee champions
