= 95th Scripps National Spelling Bee =

Spelling Bee competition held in the United States in 2023

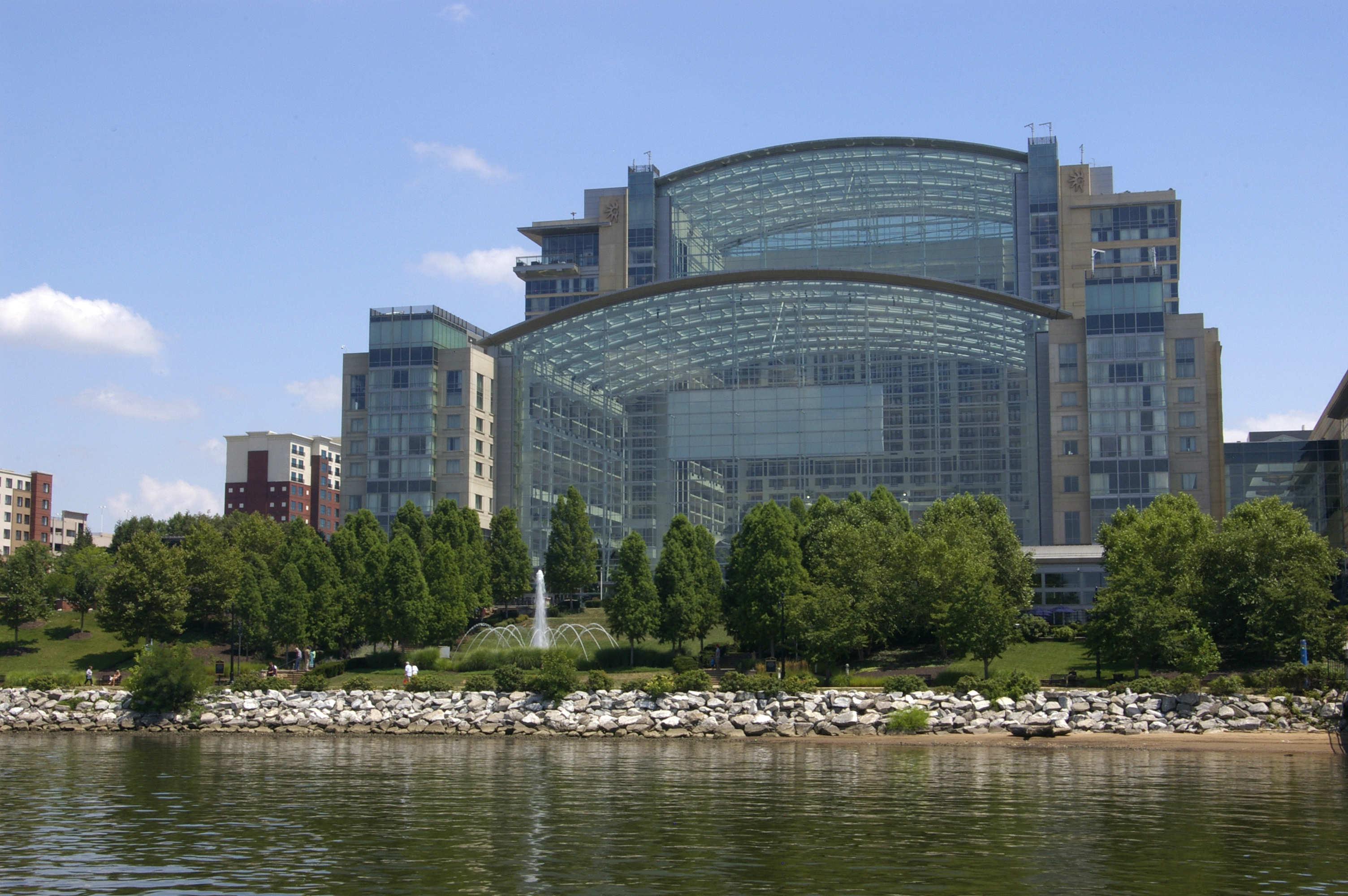
- The Gaylord National Resort & Convention Center in National Harbor, Maryland, hosted the Scripps National Spelling Bee.
- Date: May 30–June 1, 2023
- Location: Gaylord National Resort & Convention Center (National Harbor, Maryland)
- Winner: Dev Shah (14 at time of win)
- Sponsor: SNSB Region One Bee
- Sponsor location: Largo, Florida
- Winning word: psammophile
- No. of contestants: 231
- Pronouncers: Jacques Bailly and Brian Sietsema

The 95th Scripps National Spelling Bee was a spelling bee competition that was held at Gaylord National Resort & Convention Center in National Harbor, Maryland.

The 2023 bee welcomed 231 spellers from the United States and its territories, Canada, Ghana, and The Bahamas. After competing in quarterfinal and semi-final rounds on May 30 and May 31, 2023, the field of competition narrowed to 11 finalists who competed on the night of June 1, 2023.

Dev Shah of Largo, Florida, won the competition upon correctly spelling the word psammophile after Charlotte Walsh (placed second) spelled daviely incorrectly.

Shradha Rachamreddy, and two-time finalist Surya Kapu, tied for third place after surviving until round 13 of the competition.

== Field ==
Scripps National Spelling Bee's field of competition begins with 11 million students, in grades 8 and younger, who compete in local and regional spelling bee competitions to qualify for the Scripps Bee.

The 11 finalist spellers, and their respective sponsors, were the following students:

Dhruv Subramanian, 12, a 7th grader representing the San Ramon Valley Rotary Club of San Ramon, California.

Vikrant Chintanaboina, 14, an 8th grader representing the San Ramon Valley Rotary Club of San Ramon, California.

Shradha Rachamreddy, 13, a 7th grader representing the San Ramon Valley Rotary Club of San Ramon, California.

Arth Dalsania, 14, an 8th grader representing SAGE Publishing of Thousand Oaks, California.

Dev Shah, 14, an 8th grader representing SNSB Region One Bee of Largo, Florida.

Aryan Khedkar, 12, a 7th grader representing the Oakland Schools Education Foundation of Waterford, Michigan.

Sarah Fernandes, 11, a 5th grader representing the Omaha Sports Commission of Omaha, Nebraska.

Pranav Anandh, 14, an 8th grader representing the Delaware County Intermediate Unit of Morton, Pennsylvania.

Tarini Nandakumar, 12, a 6th grader representing Sweet Success ATX of Austin, Texas.

Surya Kapu, 14, an 8th grader representing The City Journals of Salt Lake City, Utah. Surya was the only finalist in 2023 who was also a finalist in 2022; then, he tied for 5th place.

Charlotte Walsh, 14, an 8th grader representing the Fairfax County Council PTA of Merrifield, Virginia.

== Competition ==
The 2023 bee was infused with new leadership as longtime Scripps Bee employee and former three-time bee participant Corrie Loeffler assumed the role of Executive Director.

A highlight of the 2023 competition was Akash Vukoti making history as the National Spelling Bee's first ever six-year repeater. Akash tied for 74th place after leaving the competition in round 4.

As in the two years since the Scripps Bee resumed after the cancellation of the 2020 competition due to the COVID-19 pandemic, spellers engaged in quarterfinal, semi-final, and final rounds over three days of competition. Each segment included spelling rounds and word meaning rounds where the speller displayed their knowledge of definitions by stating their answers from a multiple-choice selection. The bee introduced a new standardized test, conducted prior to the competition, to assess the spellers' collective abilities to aid with the work of the Word List Panel.

The bee's Word List Panel granted exclusive access to The Associated Press during the 2023 Bee Week to publicly reveal details about their process, which had been secret since the panel formed in the 1980s.

ION TV continued its broadcast coverage of the bee for a second year, with Paul Loeffler as commentator and welcoming featured guest commentators such as 2021 champion Zaila Avant-garde, 2022 champion Harini Logan, sisters and former champions Dr. Kavya (2009) and Vanya (2015) Shivashankar, and actor Yvette Nicole Brown.

Rock band The Linda Lindas performed at the bee making them the bee's first ever musical performance.

== Final rankings ==
1st place

Dev Shah

2nd place

Charlotte Walsh

3rd place (tie)

Shradha Rachamreddy

Surya Kapu

5th place (tie)

Dhruv Subramanian

Vikrant Chintanaboina

Aryan Khedkar

8th place

Arth Dalsania

9th place

Tarini Nandakumar

10th place (tie)

Sarah Fernandes

Pranav Anandh

== Word list championship round ==
- lydite
- madrepore
- Idalian
- papoula
- schistorrhachis
- elaeodochon
- leguleian
- querken
- corpsbruder
- Bloemfontein
- gazabo
- labyrinthitis (word meaning)
- saprophyte (word meaning)
- ophidian (word meaning)
- brachypterous (word meaning)
- chiromancy (word meaning)
- vermiculate (word meaning)
- chthonic (word meaning)
- tenebrous (word meaning)
- omphaloskepsis (word meaning)
- semis
- traik
- carey
- katuka
- aegagrus
- dorr
- nunnari
- Jhangar
- crenel
- pataca
- tallate
- rommack
- pharetrone
- haysel
- collembolous
- orle
- tolsester
- kelep
- akuammine
- bathypitotmeter
- daviely
- psammophile

== See also ==
- List of Scripps National Spelling Bee champions
