= Spelling the Dream =

2020 documentary film

- Film poster
- Directed by: Sam Rega
- Written by: Sam Rega; Chris Weller
- Produced by: Sam Rega; Chris Weller
- Edited by: Sam Rega
- Distributed by: Netflix
- Release date: June 3, 2020
- Running time: 82 minutes
- Country: United States
- Language: English

Spelling the Dream is a 2020 documentary film directed by Sam Rega and written by Sam Rega and Chris Weller. The premise of the film revolves around competitive spelling bees, which have been dominated by Indian-Americans in recent times. The film follows the life of four kids: Akash Vukoti, Tejas Muthusamy, Ashrita Gandhari and Shourav Dasari. The film also features interviews with Jacques Bailly, Kevin Negandhi, Sanjay Gupta, Fareed Zakaria, Hari Kondabolu, Valerie Browning, Srinivas Ayyagari, and Pawan Dhingra.

== Release ==
Spelling the Dream was released worldwide on June 3, 2020, on Netflix.

== Reception ==
The film drew positive reviews from The New York Times, The Wall Street Journal, The Guardian, The Indian Express, The Hindu, The Adelaide Review, and the Singaporean version of Harper's Bazaar.
