= 63rd Scripps National Spelling Bee =

Spelling bee held in the United States in 1990

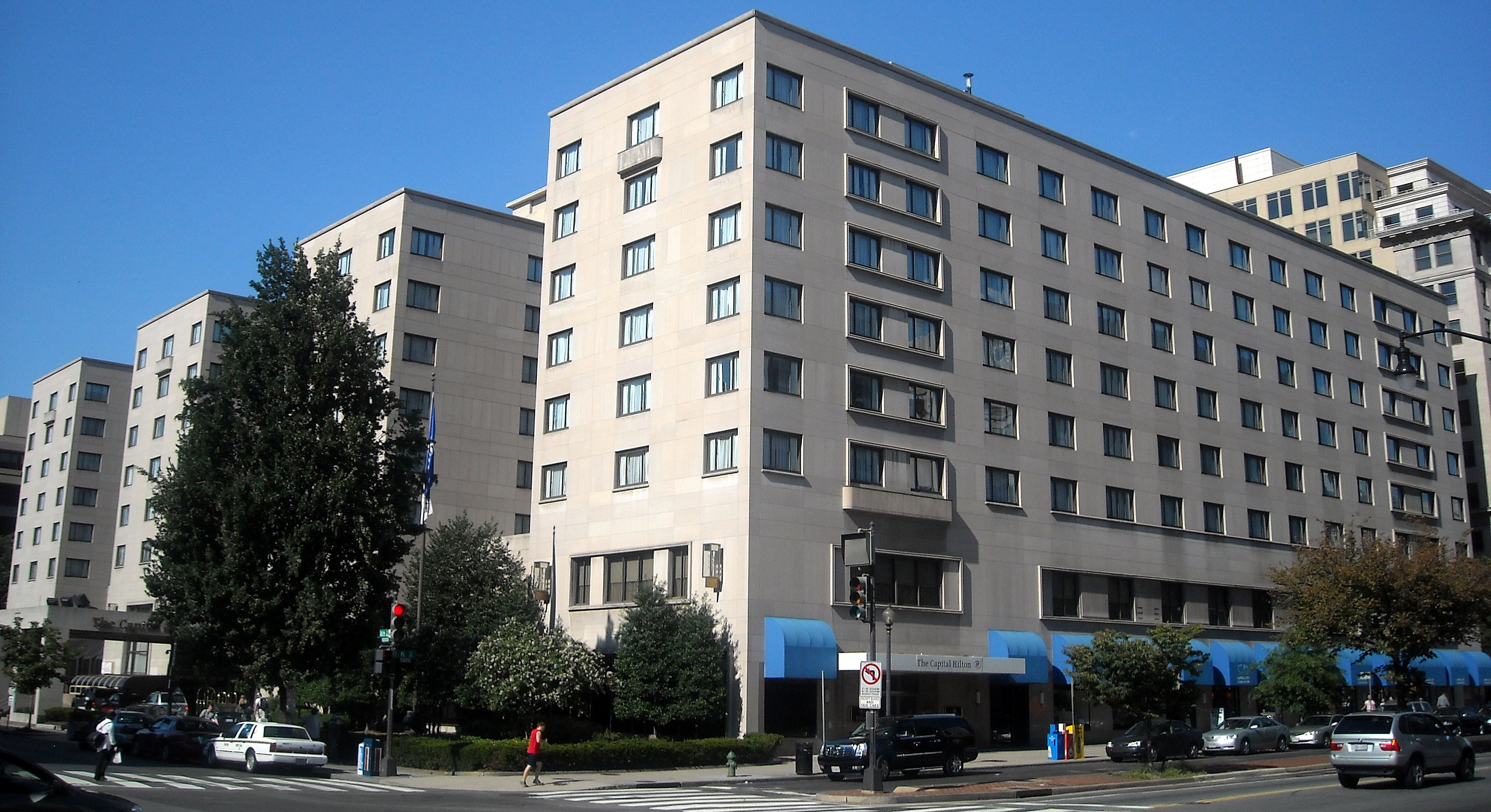
- The Capital Hilton, site of the 63rd National Spelling Bee
- Date: May 30–31, 1990
- Location: The Capital Hilton in Washington, D.C.
- Winner: Amy Marie Dimak (13 at time of win)
- Sponsor: The Seattle Times
- Sponsor location: Seattle, Washington
- Winning word: fibranne
- No. of contestants: 226
- Pronouncer: Alex Cameron

The 63rd Scripps National Spelling Bee was held in Washington, D.C. at the Capital Hilton on May 30–31, 1990, sponsored by the E.W. Scripps Company.

The winner was 13-year-old Amy Marie Dimak of Seattle, Washington, correctly spelling "fibranne". Dimak reported that she knew all 11 words she faced, and did not make any guesses. Second place went to 13-year-old Eric Enders of El Paso, Texas, who missed "douanier", spelling it as "doinier".

There were 226 spellers this year, 127 girls and 99 boys. The youngest competitor was 9 year old Erika Harrell from Muncie, Indiana. Eight spellers dropped out in round one, 33 dropped in round two, and 30 were eliminated in round three. 155 spellers survived into day two.

Spellers' others activities included a visit to Gunston Hall on Monday of Bee Week, and visits to Washington monuments and Arlington National Cemetery on Tuesday. Competition began at 8:30 a.m. on Wednesday.

The first place prize was $5,000 (and other non-cash prizes), a sizable increase over $1,500 from the prior year. Second place received $4,000; third received $2,500 and fourth got $1,000. Total cash prizes to all spellers were $26,550.
