= Jody-Anne Maxwell =

Spelling bee champion

- Born: 1986 (age 39–40); Kingston, Jamaica
- Education: University of the West Indies; Norman Manley Law School
- Known for: First non-American to win the National Spelling Bee

Jody-Anne Maxwell (born 1986) is from Kingston, Jamaica and was the winner of the 1998 Scripps National Spelling Bee at the age of 12. She made history as the first non-American to win the competition.

According to Ebony magazine, Maxwell, who was also the competition's first Black winner, was viewed as a celebrity on her return to Jamaica. Maxwell also attained significant fame in Jamaican communities within the United States.

Maxwell qualified for the Scripps competition by winning Jamaica's National Spelling Bee Championship, which her sister Janice had also won in 1990. Her prizes for winning the national bee included $10,000 cash, and an education trust fund of $11,000 (U.S).

She later went on to host the local Jamaican program The KFC Quiz Show with various co-hosts, (the first two being Dominique Lyew and Damar Pessoa) up until 2004 when the post was handed off to Samantha Strachan and Raine Manley Robertson.

Maxwell was also a contestant on Nickelodeon's game show Figure it Out in 1998. She successfully stumped the panel of judges for all three rounds.

In 2012 she attended the Norman Manley Law School at the University of the West Indies, Mona Campus.

Maxwell is also a past student of the prestigious Ardenne High School in Kingston, Jamaica.

== See also ==
- List of Scripps National Spelling Bee champions

Preceded by Rebecca Sealfon	Scripps National Spelling Bee winner 1998	Succeeded by Nupur Lala
