= Grand Hyatt Washington =

Hotel in Washington D.C.

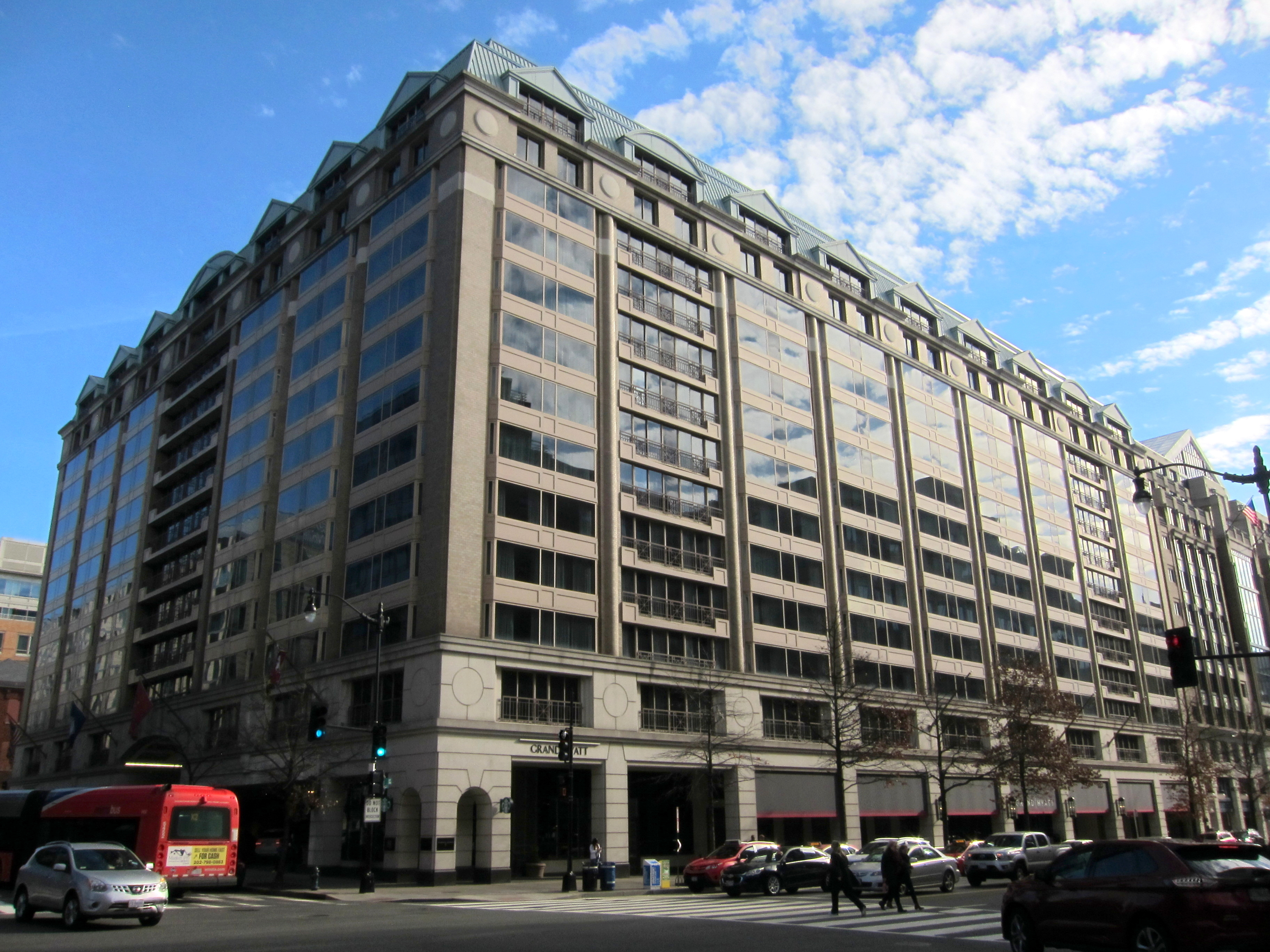
- Interactive map of the Grand Hyatt Washington area

General information
- Location: 1000 H Street NW, Washington, D.C., U.S.
- Coordinates: 38.899467°N 77.026532°W
- Opening: June 9, 1987
- Owner: Host Hotels & Resorts
- Management: Hyatt Hotels Corporation

Technical details
- Floor count: 12 above-ground; five below-ground

Design and construction
- Architect: RTKL Associates
- Developer: Quadrangle Development Corp.

Other information
- Number of rooms: 897

Website
- https://washingtondc.grand.hyatt.com

The Grand Hyatt Washington is a hotel in Washington, D.C., in the United States. The 897-room hotel, located at 1000 H Street NW, serves both tourist and business travel. From the time the hotel opened until 2003, it was directly across from the Washington Convention Center and served as a "convention headquarters" hotel for many conventions. The convention center closed and was demolished in 2004. CityCenterDC, a major office, residential, and retail complex, now occupies the site.

== Overview ==
Quadrangle Development broke ground for the Grand Hyatt Hotel on February 21, 1985. The site was directly across the street from the Washington Convention Center. The structure was designed by RTKL Associates, an architectural firm based in Annapolis, Maryland. The hotel featured a vast atrium over the lobby that ran to the roof. The inspiration for the atrium was a similar structure designed by John C. Portman Jr. and built in Atlanta, Georgia, in the 1960s. The ground floor of the atrium was designed to feature a waterfall and fish lagoon, designed by engineer Howard Fields. At the time of the groundbreaking, planners expected the hotel to have 950 rooms and cost $130 million to construct. By June, the hotel's room count had dropped to 910, and by July the cost had soared to $150 million. By December 1986, the room count had fallen to 907, and a 7,000-square-foot (650 m^{2}) water feature (lagoon and waterfall) had been added to the atrium.

As constructed, the hotel had 907 rooms and was the city's third-largest hotel. The hotel cost $140 million to build, which included a $1 million, 13-story skylit atrium above the lobby. The water feature in the lobby consisted of a waterfall which began 35 feet (11 m) above the lobby and ended 75 feet (23 m) below it. The waterfall helped fill and circulate water in a 27,000 US gallons (100,000 L) lagoon.

The hotel had five below-ground floors, with the lagoon on the first below-ground level. Banquet space, ballrooms, and meeting rooms existed on the second to fifth below-ground levels. The lobby occupied the first floor. Slightly raised platforms and bridges connected various parts of the lobby to one another, with stairs and escalators, placed at diagonals to H Street NW, led to the below-ground levels. The structure had double-loaded corridors, which meant that guest rooms either faced inward at the atrium or outward at the city. All inward-facing rooms had balconies overlooking the atrium. The north walls of the atrium were decorated with Mediterranean-style pilasters, with a Mediterranean-style arcade formed by segmental arches on the first and second floor. A similar design motif existed on the east and west sides of the atrium, which were stepped back from the first below-ground level. Campanile-like towers, which served as structural supports for the lobby elevators, were set against the south wall. Two gift shops graced the lobby.

The exterior of the hotel featured rhythmic metal-framed windows with spandrels. The base of the building was clad in rusticated stone panels. The corners of the building featured entrances to the hotel lobby bar and to a delicatessen-like restaurant, which helped to alleviate the monotony of the vast expanses of wall. A mansard roof topped the structure. The roofline was punctuated with dormers, each topped by a pediment, which helped to mask the HVAC and mechanical equipment on the roof.

In addition to its regular guest rooms, the hotel had two special types of rooms. The hotel's top floor was called the Regency Club, and each of these rooms (aimed at business travelers) came with special amenities. The hotel also had three presidential suites. Each presidential had a hot tubm, sauna, wet bar, and other amenities. The firm of Hirsh-Bedner oversaw the interior decoration scheme. The public spaces featured marble floors, while the meeting and banquet levels had white maple walls. A large number of original artworks were placed throughout the public spaces of the hotel, including two Cubist sculptural pieces by Guy Dill.

=== Critical assessment ===
Benjamin Forgey, the architectural critic for The Washington Post, called the Hyatt's architectural design grand, but not great. Although aesthetically pleasing, he called it "a cold, passionless design." Elements of the structure were clichéd but also efficient, he concluded. "[T]his building is better than a brutal box; we see the architects conscientiously hitting a lot of the right urban design keys without creating a wholly pleasant, let alone a memorable, melody."

== 2012 sale ==
Quadrangle Development put the now 888-room Grand Hyatt Hotel up for sale, and in 2011 Host Hotels & Resorts agreed to place a $15 million deposit on the building to prevent another bid from being entertained. Host, however, withdrew from the negotiations on December 18, losing its deposit.

However, Host reversed itself in 2012 and on July 22 announced it had agreed to buy the Grand Hyatt Hotel for $400 million. The sale was the largest hotel sale to date in the history of the District of Columbia. Host rebranded the hotel as the Grand Hyatt Washington.

== Rating ==
In March 2017, Cvent, an event management company, ranked the Grand Hyatt Washington 51st in its annual list of the top U.S. hotels for meetings.
