= History of Long Island =

Historical overview

Long Island has had a long recorded history from the first European settlements in the 17th century to today. Greatly influenced by construction of railroads in the 19th century, it experienced growth in tourism as well as the development of towns and villages into some of the first modern suburbs in the United States.

== Native American settlements ==
At the time of European contact, the Lenape people (named the Delaware by Europeans) inhabited the western end of the Island, and spoke the Munsee dialect of the Algonquian language family. Giovanni da Verrazzano was the first European to record an encounter with these people when he entered what is now New York Bay in 1524.

The eastern portion of the island was inhabited by speakers of the Mohegan-Montauk-Narragansett language group of the same language family, representing their ties to the Aboriginal peoples inhabiting what is now Connecticut and Rhode Island. The area was central to the production of Wampum, providing the resources necessary for its creation.

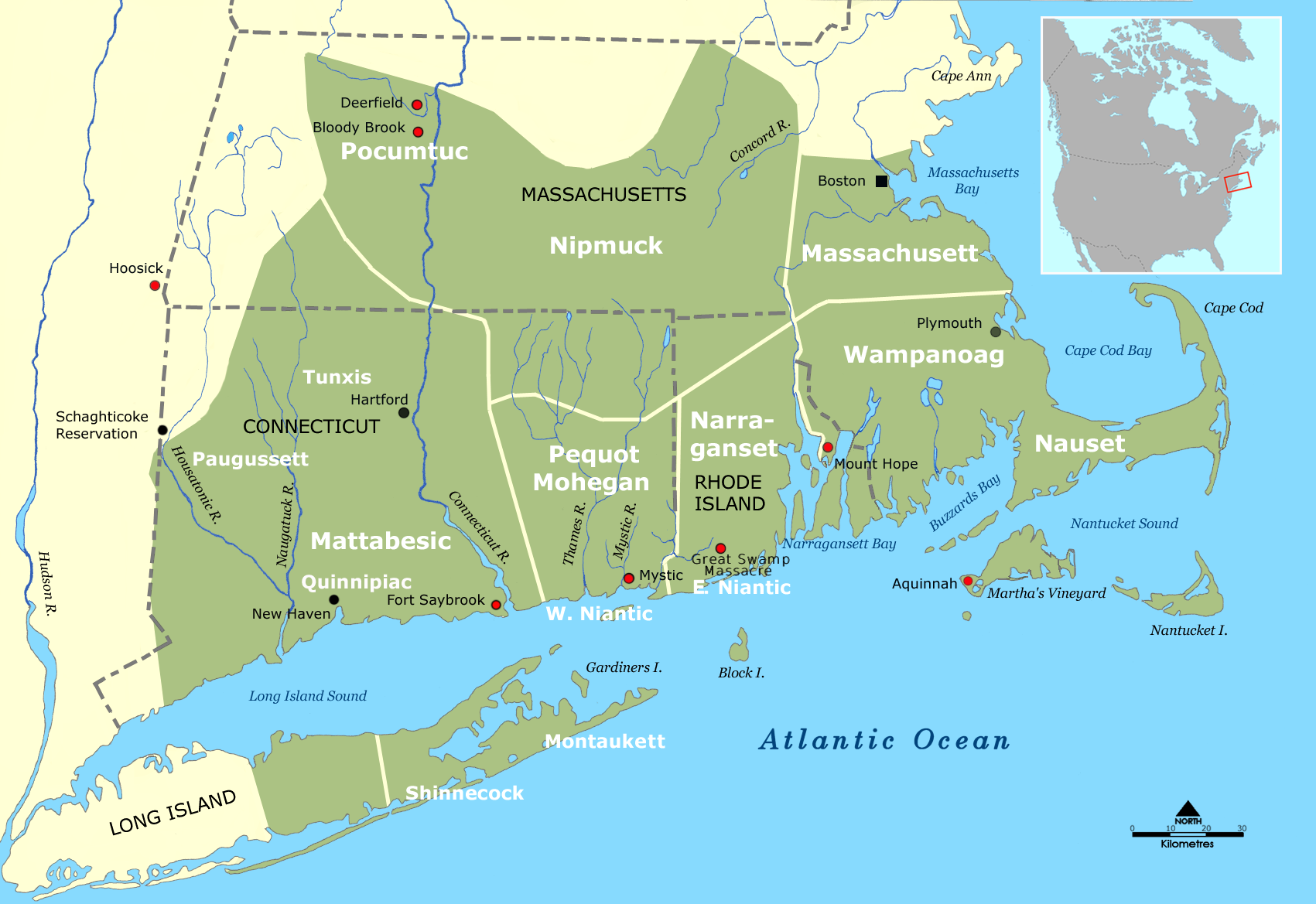
Montaukett tribe and their northern neighbors

Decades after the decline in population of Native American on Long Island, amateur anthropologist Silas Wood published a book claiming that there had been several homogenous "tribes" traditional to Long Island; they erroneously became collectively known as the Metoac, a word that has no known Native American origin and means nothing in any Indigenous language on Long Island. Modern scientific scholarship has shown that there were two linguistic groups representing two cultural identities on the island, as noted above, not "13 tribes" as asserted by Wood. The Montaukett, Unkechaug, and Shinnecock nations, three Native American groups with ties to aboriginal inhabitants, still live on the island.

A Native American name for Long Island is Paumanok, meaning "The Island that Pays Tribute". More powerful tribes in the surrounding areas forced the relatively peaceful Long Islanders to give tributes and payment to avoid attacks.

== Colony ==
=== Dutch and English Settlements ===
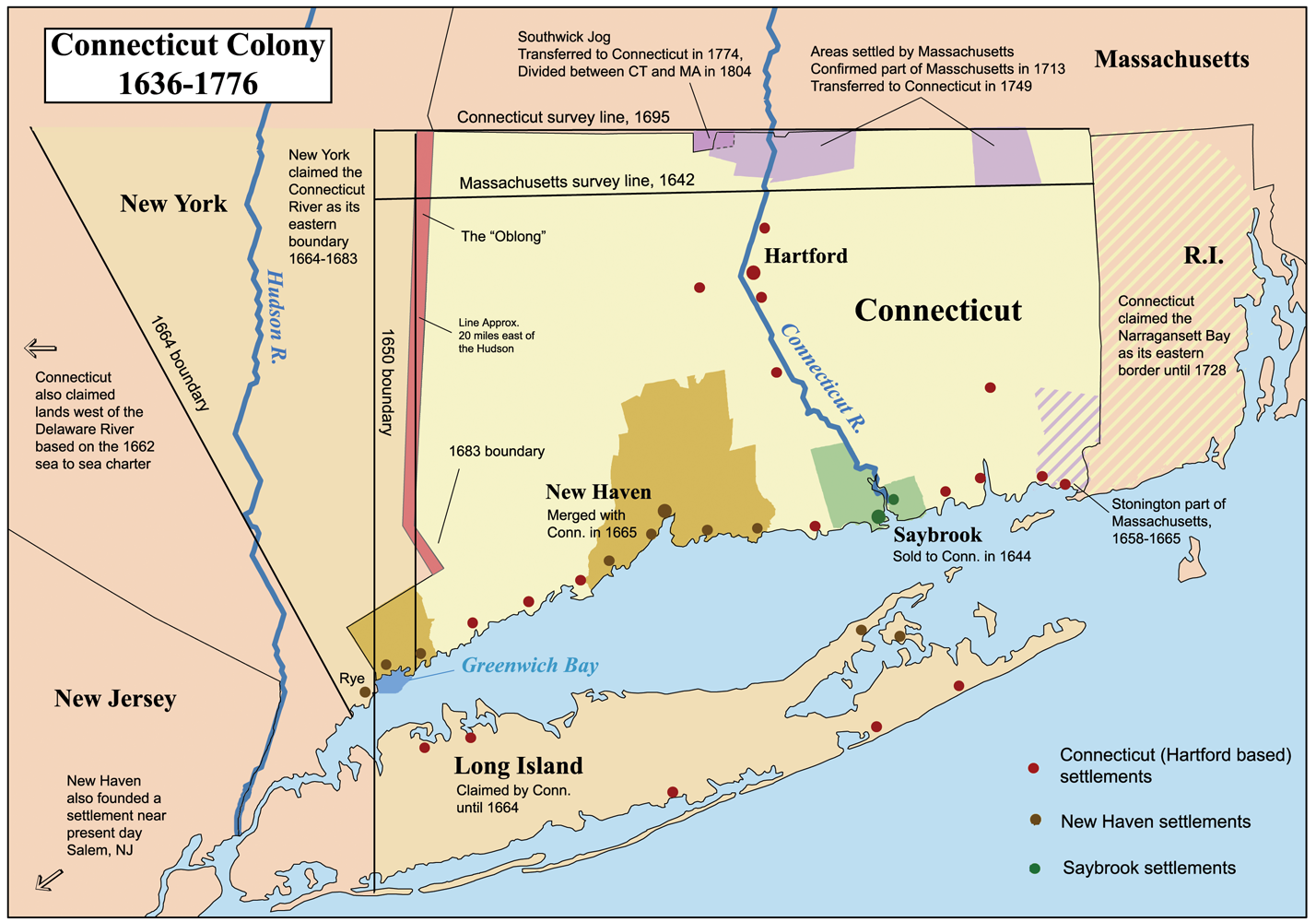
A map of the Connecticut, New Haven, and Saybrook colonies.

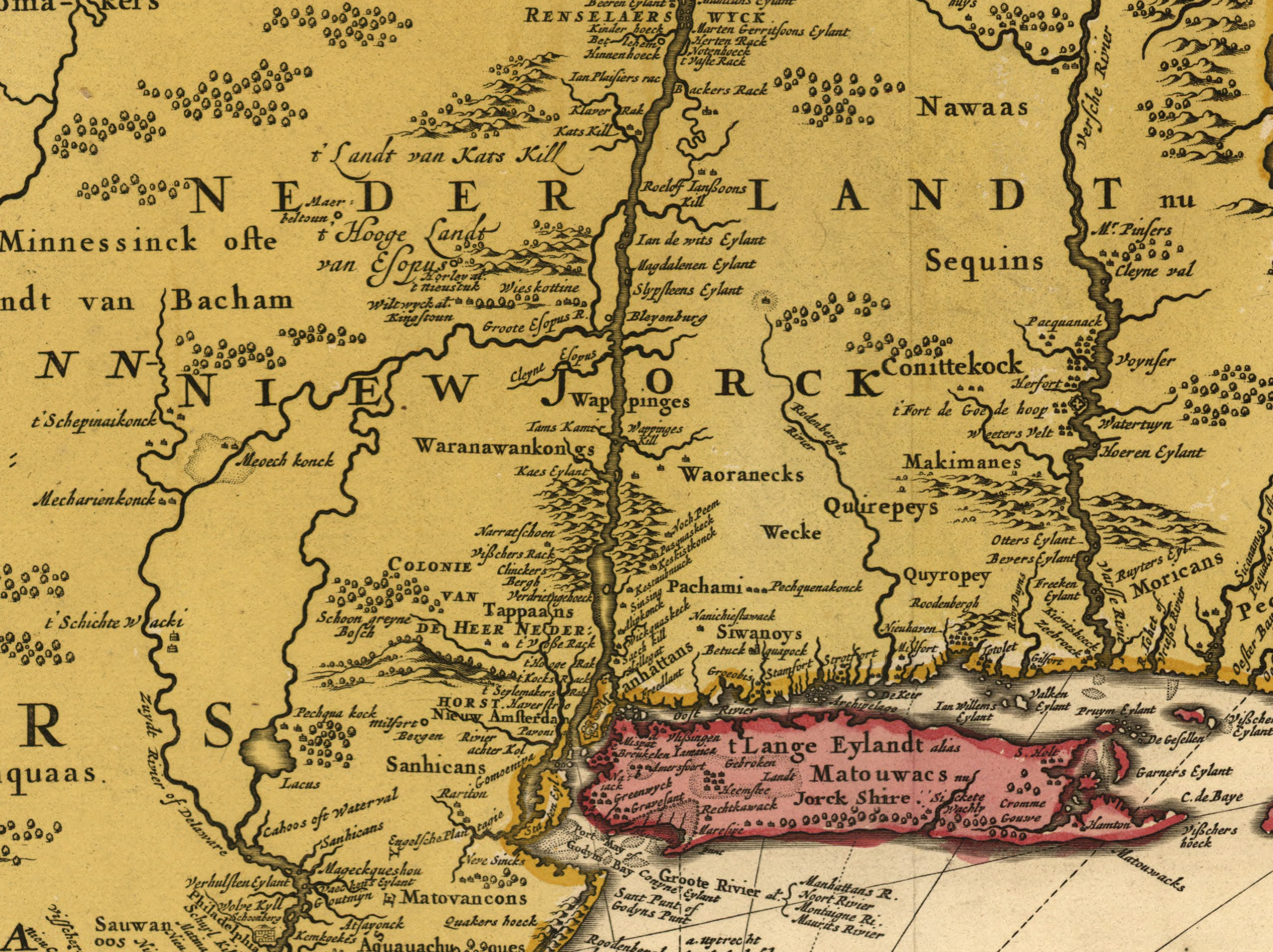
Excerpt from the Novi Belgii Novæque Angliæ map by Nicolaes Visscher (1685), with "'t Lange Eylandt alias Matouwacs" in red

The western portion of Long Island was settled by the Dutch, who named it 't Lange Eylandt, which translates to the Long Island in old-Dutch. They also had early settlements in the 17th century on what are now Manhattan and Staten Island.

On April 22, 1636, Charles I of England ordered that the Plymouth Colony, which had laid claim to the island but had not settled it, give the island to William Alexander. Alexander through his agent James Farret (who personally received Shelter Island and Robins Island) in turn sold most of the eastern island to the New Haven and Connecticut colonies.

English settlers first arrived at Southold in eastern Long Island in 1636/37 and were involved in the distillation of turpentine resins. Among those who first settled in Southold were Matthew Sunderland, William Salmon, Thomas Reeve, Thomas Terrill, Thomas Benedict, and Henry Whitney, with Sunderland, Salmon, Whitney, and Benedict taking equal ownership of land tracts Sunderland had received from Farret. Lion Gardiner was among the first English settlers as he settled on Gardiners Island in 1637.

Farret arrived in New Amsterdam in 1637 to present his claim of English sovereignty and was arrested and sent to prison in Holland where he escaped. English attempted to settle at Cow Bay at what today is Port Washington in May 1640 but were arrested and released after saying they were mistaken about the title.

English settlements on the east end began in earnest shortly thereafter.

Puritans from New Haven, Connecticut, arrived in present-day Southold on October 21, 1640. Under the leadership of the Reverend John Youngs (1598–1672), with Peter Hallock, the families of Barnabas Horton (abt. 1600–1680), John Budd, John Conklin (1600–1684), William Wells, John Tuthill, Thomas Mapes, Richard Terry, Matthias Corwin, Robert Akerly, Zachariah Corey and Isaac Arnold planted the first English and first white settlement in eastern Long Island. They purchased the land in the summer of 1640 from an Indian tribe named the Corchaugs. The Corchaug name of what became Southold was Yenniock. Southampton was founded when settlers from Lynn, Massachusetts established residence on lands obtained from local Shinnecock Indian Nation also in 1640. The first settlers included eight men, one woman, and a boy who came ashore at Conscience Point. Dutch complaints did not matter. Officials of the Colony of New Netherland did not make immediate efforts to expel the English from such a remote place.

Southold remained under the jurisdiction of New Haven until 1662, and of Connecticut until 1674. When the English handed over the colony of New York to the Dutch in 1673, the eastern towns, including Southold, Easthampton and Southampton, refused to submit. The Dutch attempted to force the matter by arms. The English colonists repelled them with assistance from Connecticut settlers.

When New York became English again in 1674, these eastern towns, whose people were Yankee by background, preferred to stay part of Connecticut. Although Connecticut agreed, the government of the Duke of York forced the matter. Governor Sir Edmund Andros threatened to eliminate the settlers' rights to land if they did not yield, which they did by 1676. This was chiefly the result of the Duke of York's grudge against Connecticut, as New Haven had hidden three of the judges who sentenced the Duke's father King Charles I to death in 1649.

Long Island contained three of the original twelve counties of the English Province of New York organized in 1683: Kings, Queens, and Suffolk. At that time, Queens County included all of present-day Nassau County and a small portion of western Suffolk County.

Residents in Long Island towns conducted several witch hunts, including one involving the daughter of Lion Gardiner in East Hampton. Early colonial figures on the island include Wyandanch, William "Tangier" Smith, Captain William Kidd, Lion Gardiner, and John Underhill.

=== Revolutionary War ===
The Battle of Long Island, the largest Revolutionary War battle, ranged across Kings County, now the Borough of Brooklyn in New York City. Apart from espionage and raids across Long Island Sound, there was limited military action in Queens and Suffolk County. Throughout most of the war, Long Island was controlled by the King's forces. As was customary, they billeted Hessian and regular troops with local households, who had to provide bedding and food for soldiers. In Oyster Bay, Major John André was visiting the headquarters of Lt. Col. James Simcoe at Raynham Hall, the family home of Robert Townsend, one of George Washington's Culper Ring spies. Townsend family legend holds that Robert's sister Sally overheard André and Simcoe discussing Benedict Arnold's treasonous plan to turn West Point over to the King's forces.

Colonists conducted numerous raids on Long Island during the war, usually by whaleboats from Connecticut. The most famous raid was the Sag Harbor or Meigs Raid in 1777. Possibly the last battle of the American Revolution was the "Boat Fight" of December 1782.

== Nineteenth century ==
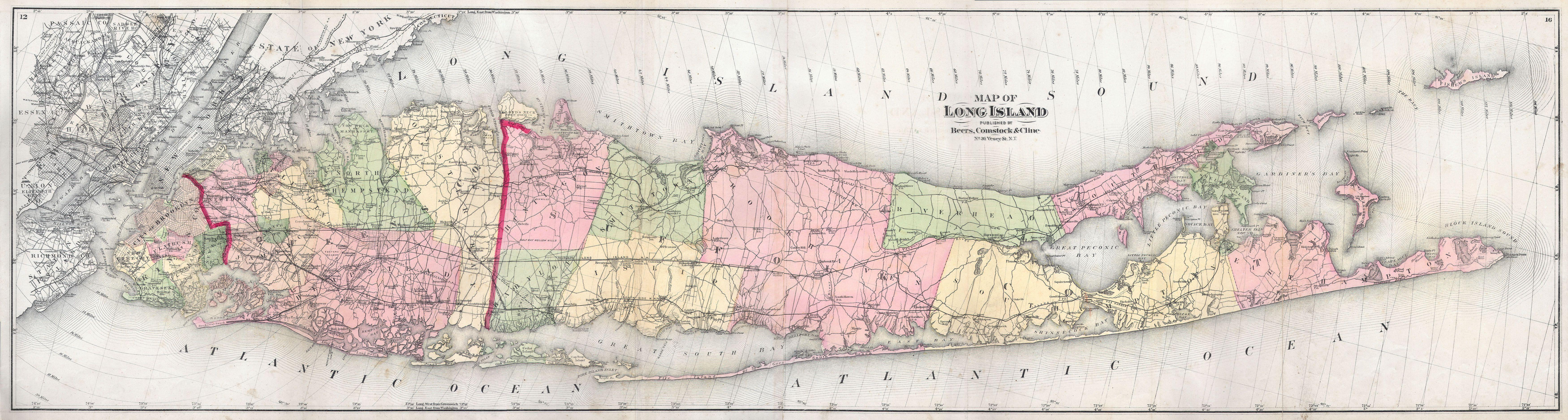
(1873)

In the 19th century, Long Island was still mainly rural and agricultural. Suburbanization started modestly on Long Island when reliable steam ferry service allowed prosperous Wall Streeters to get to new Brooklyn Heights homes in time for dinner. Rural traffic was served by the new Brooklyn and Jamaica Plank road through Jamaica Pass, among others. After the American Civil War, streetcar suburbs sprawled out onto the outwash plain of central and southern Kings County. Trolleys also brought workers from other parts of western Queens to Long Island City jobs.

The Long Island Rail Road was begun as a combined ferry-rail route to Boston via Greenport. The predecessor to the Long Island Rail Road began service in 1836 from the ferry terminal (to Manhattan) through Brooklyn to Jamaica in Queens, and completed the line to the east end of Long Island in 1844. Other rail lines to Coney Island, the Rockaways and Long Beach serviced the beach resort towns. The growing and merging railroads opened up more than 50 stations in (present-day) Nassau County and over 40 in Suffolk Country, laying the foundation for the future suburbanization of the island.

From 1830 until 1930, population roughly doubled every twenty years, and several cities were incorporated, such as the City of Brooklyn in Kings County, and Long Island City in Queens.

By the late 19th century, Long Island had become a summer refuge for residents of New York City. The Landing, in Glen Cove, is named for the spot where 19th-century steamship lines would disembark summer visitors, not far from where J. P. Morgan had his summer mansion. Long Island was the home of a branch of the prominent Roosevelt family, including author Robert Roosevelt, and his more famous nephew, President Theodore Roosevelt, who built a summer home at Sagamore Hill on the North Shore of Nassau County – on the outskirts of Oyster Bay. Roosevelt Field was named after Quentin Roosevelt, Theodore's son. Gold Coast Mansions on the North Shore of Long Island were also the homes of the wealthy Vanderbilt family and late-19th-century financiers and industrialists, such as John Paul Getty, Charles Pratt and others.

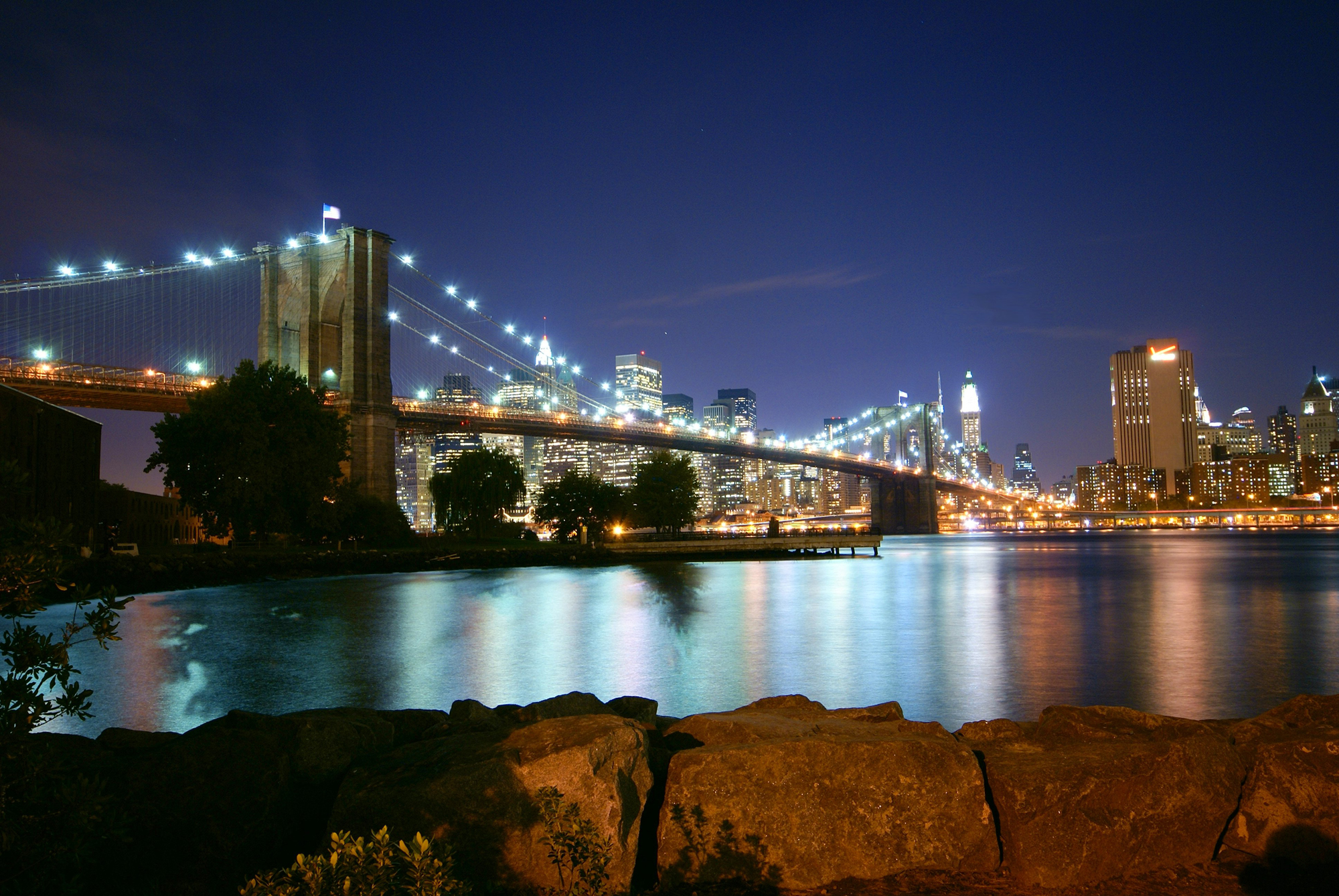
The Brooklyn Bridge, the first of seven bridges constructed across the East River, connects Long Island with the Borough of Manhattan (in background).

Until the 1883 completion of the Brooklyn Bridge, the only connection between Long Island and the rest of the United States was by boat. Other bridges and tunnels followed, and a suburban character spread as population increased.

On January 1, 1898, Kings County and portions of Queens were consolidated into The City of Greater New York, abolishing all cities and towns within them. The easternmost 280 square miles (725 km^{2}) of Queens County, which were not part of the consolidation plan, formed a separate county in 1899. "Nassau", one of several names by which the island was once known, was revived to represent the newly established county.

=== Slavery on Long Island ===
Black people have been an integral part of Long Island history, most arriving first as slaves before the Revolution and working both at domestic and rural trades. New York and Long Island kept slavery until laws for its gradual abolition were passed in 1799. The last slaves were freed by 1827. Most freedmen settled near where they had been living.

With the small family farms and industrial economy within the North, the need for slavery was much less than in the Southern United States. Slavery tended to be more common in rural areas of the Northeast, like Long Island, rather than in the cities. Slavery took a different form in the Northern states than on Southern plantations. While slaves were still treated as property by law, and included as bequests in wills, they were fewer in number. On Long Island, it was typical for farmers to own five or six slaves per household. They lived closely within the family, sometimes within the same quarters.

After the Civil War, the issue of race increased on Long Island, as well as surrounding areas in New York. Fears of freed blacks taking the jobs of working-class whites created tensions in addition to tensions with immigrant communities seeking work. As time progressed, African Americans within the local Tri-State area began to work in industrialized cities such as New York City and Philadelphia.

== Growth in the 20th century ==
Early in the 20th century, elevated and subway trains allowed masses of workers to commute to Manhattan jobs from Queens and eastern Brooklyn, which offered cheaper and larger housing but were far beyond reasonable walking distance. Seven new bridges were built across the East River - Williamsburg Bridge (1903), Queensboro Bridge (1909), Manhattan Bridge (1909), Hell Gate Bridge (1916), Triborough Bridge (1936), Bronx-Whitestone Bridge (1939), and Throgs Neck Bridge (1961). Immigrants spilling over from New York City made comfortable lives on Long Island. The immigration waves of Southern and Eastern Europe have been pivotal in creating the diversity on Long Island that many other American regions lack. These immigrations are reflected in the large Irish American, Italian American and Jewish-American populations. Typically the immigrants lived in the city first or the more urban western parts of the island, and their children and grandchildren moved further east. Late-20th-century immigrants, by contrast, often settled directly in Nassau County and other suburban areas.

When racing was banned on public roads, one of the Vanderbilts opened the Long Island Motor Parkway in 1908 from Kissena (Queens) to Lake Ronkonkoma. This limited access motor highway was one of the first in the world.

In the 1920s and 1930s, suburbanization reached beyond the western end of the island, and Long Island began the transformation from backwoods and farms to the paradigm of the American suburb. Under its president Robert Moses, the Long Island State Park Commission spanned the island with parkways and state parks. Jones Beach was the most famous, "the crown jewel in Moses' State Park System". Long Island quickly became New York City's retreat – with millions of people going to and from the city to the new state parks. In time, development started to follow the parkways and the railroad lines, with commuter towns springing up first along the railroad, then the roadways: the Southern State Parkway, the Northern State Parkway, and, from the 1960s on, the Long Island Expressway.

After World War II, Long Island's population skyrocketed, mostly in Nassau County and western Suffolk County. People who worked and lived in New York City moved out to Long Island in the new developments built during the post-war boom. The most famous post-war development was the town of Levittown. Positioned along the Wantagh Parkway and near the Southern State Parkway, in the area formerly known as Island Trees, Levittown became the first place where a developer built numerous adjacent houses in one subdivision, houses called Levitts built by Levitt & Sons, providing great opportunity for GIs' returning home to build families.

After the success of Levittown, other areas modeled what some people criticize as "suburban sprawl", and Nassau County became more densely populated than its eastern counterpart, Suffolk County. In the late 1960s, areas in Suffolk County, such as Deer Park and Commack, also saw rapid development. Driving out east along routes such as New York Route 27 (Sunrise Highway) along the South Shore or on the North Shore along New York State Route 25 (Jericho Turnpike) or New York State Route 25A, houses and buildings start to spread out, even turning back to the potato and sod farms that once were East of and including towns such as Mount Sinai. Most sod farms are located in Brookhaven and Riverhead. (Although development is spreading further east)

== 21st century ==
=== Long Island and 9/11 ===
Long Island residents suffered many losses in the September 11, 2001 attacks on the World Trade Center. A large portion of the island's residents commute daily to Manhattan for work. In the days after the attacks, many of the victims' cars remained parked in the same spots at Long Island Rail Road stations – leaving a visual reminder of the intimate nature of the tragedy for other commuters.

Nearly 500 Long Island residents died from the 9/11 attacks – 23 from the village of Garden City. Almost all of Long Island's volunteer fire departments were called to assist the New York City Fire Department (FDNY) by providing manpower at Ground Zero, assisting in evacuations, and providing firefighting coverage for areas of the city stripped by the response to lower Manhattan. Due to extremely clear weather, many in Eastern Long Island, including places like Old Inlet and Fire Island, could see the huge clouds of smoke rising for days from the ashes of the World Trade Center.

=== Late 2000s recession ===
Long Island slipped into recession in September 2008, after the collapse of Lehman Brothers. It lost 7,100 private-sector jobs in the 12 months ended in November 2008 with losses spread across most industries. Sales of new homes on the island decreased from 5,292 in the third quarter of 2008 to 2,902 in the first quarter of 2009; the downturn also affected luxury rentals in places such as the Hamptons. The median price of newly sold Nassau homes fell from a peak of $502,500 in August 2007 to $410,000 in November 2008, a drop of more than 18 percent. Comparable Suffolk prices peaked at $520,000 in June 2007 and declined to $435,000 in November 2008. Home prices on the island had dipped to their lowest point in the fourth quarter of 2011, reaching $339,000. Long Island was still recovering from the recession in late 2012, when the region was impacted by Hurricane Sandy. In November 2017, nearly a decade after the crash, average home prices had reached $415,000 but had still not fully recovered from the recession.

== Aviation history ==
Long Island is important in the history of aviation. Roosevelt Airfield was established in 1916 in Garden City, Nassau County. From this airport, Charles Lindbergh took off on his historic 1927 nonstop Orteig Prize flight from New York to Paris, France. Roosevelt Airfield was closed in 1951. Its land was redeveloped for commercial uses, including a shopping mall, Hofstra University, and numerous mid-density housing developments.

Long Island was also the location of major historic aerospace companies. Farmingdale-based Republic Aviation, for instance, manufactured the famed P-47 fighter aircraft during the World War II period. Grumman Aircraft, with operations in Bethpage and Calverton, produced the F-14 U.S. Navy fighter during the 1970s and 1980s. It was also the chief contractor on the Apollo Lunar Module that landed men on the moon. They received the contract on 7 November 1962, and ultimately built 13 lunar modules (LMs). One is on display at the Cradle of Aviation Museum at the former Mitchel Air Force Base on the Hempstead Plains of Long Island.

Another important historic Long Island airport was Floyd Bennett Field in Brooklyn. Opened in 1931, it was New York City's first commercial airport. It was the start point or terminus of historic flights by Amelia Earhart, Roscoe Turner, Wiley Post, and Howard Hughes. It was sold to the Navy shortly before World War II for use as a Naval Air Station. In 1972, the Navy departed and the open space was transferred to the National Park Service as part of Gateway National Recreation Area.

Two of New York City's main airports, LaGuardia Airport which opened for commercial flights in 1939, and John F. Kennedy International Airport opened in 1948, are located on the geographic Island. There have been more than ten major air disasters. The three following planes all crashed in either Nassau or Suffolk County: In 1965, Eastern Airlines Flight 663 crashed into Jones Beach State Park after take-off. In 1990, Avianca Flight 52 crashed into Cove Neck, NY, killing 73 passengers. In 1996, TWA Flight 800 exploded over water off the coast of the small hamlet of East Moriches. Fatalities totaled 230 people in the disaster. A monument to those lost stands at Smith Point County Park on Fire Island in Suffolk County.

On July 25, 2012, Representative Carolyn McCarthy (NY-04), who represents part of Nassau County, introduced the Long Island Aviation History Act. The bill, H.R. 6201, requires the National Park Service to study various ways to commemorate and preserve Long Island's aviation history, including by designating parts of Long Island as National Historic Sites and National Historic Parks. The bill also requires the National Park Service to evaluate ways to enhance historical research, education, interpretation and public awareness of Long Island's aviation history.

== See also ==
- National Register of Historic Places listings in Kings County, New York
- National Register of Historic Places listings in Nassau County, New York
- National Register of Historic Places listings in Queens County, New York
- National Register of Historic Places listings in Suffolk County, New York
- History of the Long Island Rail Road
- Queens directories
- Cherry Grove, New York
