= Robert Guestier Goelet =

American philanthropist (1923–2019)

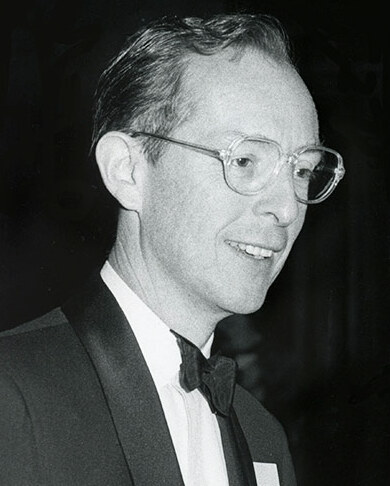

President of the New-York Historical Society
- In office 1971–1987
- Preceded by: Frederick Baldwin Adams Jr.
- Succeeded by: Albert L. Key

President of the American Museum of Natural History
- In office 1968–1975
- Preceded by: Gardner D. Stout
- Succeeded by: George D. Langdon Jr.

Personal details
- Born: September 28, 1923 Amblainville, France
- Died: October 9, 2019 (aged 96) New York City, U.S.
- Spouse: Alexandra Gardiner Creel (m. 1976)
- Children: 2
- Parent(s): Robert Walton Goelet; Anne Marie Guestier Goelet
- Education: Brooks School; Harvard University (B.A.)
- Occupation: Banker, real estate developer
- Known for: Philanthropy

Robert Guestier Goelet (guh-LET; September 28, 1923 – October 9, 2019) was an American philanthropist and executive at Chemical Bank, founded by the Goelet family in 1824.

== Early life ==
Goelet was born on September 28, 1923, at a chateau in Amblainville, France. He was a son of Anne Marie (née Guestier) Goelet, whose family were wine merchants (Barton & Guestier) and owned the 10,000 acre chateau, and Robert Walton Goelet. His mother was French and his father was American. His father, who owned the Ritz-Carlton Hotel in New York, donated the hotel to Harvard University after his death in 1941.

Goelet moved to New York at the age of 12, attended the Brooks School in North Andover, Massachusetts and graduated from Harvard University in 1945 with a bachelor's degree in history.

== Career ==
During World War II, Goelet trained as a Helldiver bomber pilot with the United States Navy, but he did not see combat. He later served as a Lt. in the U.S. Navy Reserve. Goelet also served as a member of the New York City Council.

Goelet served as President of the family real-estate firms, Goelet Realty Company and the Rhode Island Corporation, both based out of 425 Park Avenue. In 1952, he was elected a director of the Chemical Bank (today known as JPMorgan Chase & Co.) which was founded by an ancestor, Peter Goelet, in 1824. He also served on the boards of French Institute Alliance Française, the National Audubon Society, the Carnegie Institution for Science, and Phipps Houses. In 1957, he became a director of Air America, the Central Intelligence Agency-financed private air charter company.

In late 1975, he was named president of the American Museum of Natural History, and was known as a "man 'nuts for fossils'." He served as the museum's Chairman until his retirement in 1989. He previously served as president of the New York Historical Society (from 1971 to 1987), and the New York Zoological Society (from 1970 to 1975) (which is today known as the Wildlife Conservation Society). He also served on the Board of Trustees as a Life Trustee at the Bronx Zoo.

== Personal life ==
In September 1976, 52 year-old Goelet married former debutante and graduate of Barnard College and Yale School of Forestry & Environmental Studies, Alexandra Gardiner Creel (b. 1940) on Gardiners Island. Creel, who was previously married to Peter F. Tufo, is the daughter of Alexandra (née Gardiner) Creel and J. Randall Creel, a retired Justice of the Court of Special Sessions and Criminal Court. They were the parents of:

- Alexandra Gardiner Goelet (b. c. 1977), who runs the family investment office along with her younger brother Robert.
- Robert Gardiner Goelet (b. c. 1979), a former project manager for the Lower Manhattan Development Corporation.

After the death of his wife's uncle, Robert David Lion Gardiner, in 2004, the Goelets took possession of the 3,300 acre Gardiner's Island, which has 27 miles of coastline, several colonial buildings, a 200-year-old windmill, and a family cemetery.

Goelet was a member of the French Jockey Club. He died at his home in Manhattan on October 9, 2019.

Cultural offices
Preceded by Gardner D. Stout	President of the American Museum of Natural History; 1968–1975	Succeeded by George D. Langdon Jr.
Preceded by Frederick Baldwin Adams Jr.	President of the New-York Historical Society; 1971–1987	Succeeded by Albert L. Key
