= Wyandanch (disambiguation) =

Wyandanch is a hamlet and census-designated place (CDP) in the Town of Babylon in Suffolk County, New York.

Wyandanch may also refer to:

- Wyandanch (LIRR station)
- Wyandanch (sachem)

== See also ==
- Wyandance (disambiguation)
