= Quashawam =

Quashawam was a leader of the Montauketts in the late-17th century on eastern Long Island. The daughter of sachem Wyandanch and sister of Wyancombone, she was kidnapped with other Montaukett women by the Niantics in 1653. Colonist Lion Gardiner assisted in her return and in gratitude for this and other help over the years, Wyandanch gave him 10 square miles of land in a deed also signed by Wyandanch's wife which mentions Quashawam's ransom.

Quashawam inherited land from Wyandanch's grandmother, as well a broad web of intervillage relationships upon the death of her parents and her brother in the early 1660s. English settlers recognized her as "chief sachem" over the Shinnecocks and the Montauketts in 1664. New Amsterdam's Dutch authorities however chose to trade with other indigenous networks. Historian Susanah Shaw Romney wrote, "Quashawam's actions, and English and Dutch authorities' use or rejection of the power inherent in her intimate networks, created a climate in Long Island in the 1660s where English influence grew while Dutch influence quickly drained away."

Quashawam's name appears on legal documents in 1664-66 English land records relating to Montauk, Jamaica, and other locations. On February 1664, she signed a contract with four Shinnecock representatives witnessed by English Southampton settlers. It promised that Quashawam would protect the Shinnecock in exchange for their recognizing her as their leader. It also established a cousin as her heir and his line of successors. The contract also empowered Quashawam's friend John Scott to "examine and demand and sue" for payment all Long Island lands squatted by the English or Dutch.

Quashawam married a Pequot sachem and died in 1666.
