= Feed Me =

Feed Me may refer to:

- Jon Gooch (born 1984), English musician, stage name Feed Me
- Feed Me (film), a 2013 Chinese drama
- Feed Me, a newsletter founded by writer Emily Sundberg

== Songs ==
- "Feed Me (Git It)", a song by Alan Menken and Howard Ashman from the 1982 musical Little Shop of Horrors
- "Feed Me", a song by English band Wire from the 1987 album The Ideal Copy
- "Feed Me", a song by Belgian band Triggerfinger from the 2010 album All This Dancin' Around
- "Feed Me", a song by American band Foster the People from the 2024 album Paradise State of Mind
