= Emily Sundberg =

American writer (born 1994 or 1995)

Emily Sundberg (born 1994 or 1995) is an American writer. She is the founder of the New York-based business and culture newsletter Feed Me.

== Early life and education ==
Sundberg grew up in Huntington, New York. She studied advertising and marketing at the Fashion Institute of Technology.

== Career ==
Sundberg began her career in digital marketing, working for companies such as New York magazine, Condé Nast and Great Jones. She launched a Substack newsletter in summer 2020 as a venue for short fiction. She was laid off from her role as a creative strategist at Meta Platforms in November 2022, at which point she began publishing daily newsletter posts about workplace gossip.

Sundberg describes Feed Me's focus as "the spirit of enterprise," reporting on the consumer economy, fashion, and cosmopolitan life in New York City. The Ankler founder Janice Min told The New York Times that Sundberg is "almost like a Carrie Bradshaw of her generation." Sundberg writes Feed Me in the first person, referring liberally to gossip shared by her friends and her day-to-day experiences in New York. Each issue of the newsletter originally included a selfie of Sundberg. Three freelance columnists periodically cover transit, restaurants and entertainment.

In 2025, Feed Me had more than 150,000 readers, and the Times reported that Sundberg likely earns at least $400,000 in annual subscription revenue. That year, Sundberg hired editors Anna Silman and Cami Fateh to expand Feed Me's reporting capacity. In November 2025, Feed me launched a food-focused podcast, Expense Account, hosted by columnist Jason Lee. In 2026, Sundberg said she planned to add a monthly West Coast edition.

Sundberg has reported freelance articles for GQ and Grub Street. She was previously represented by WME Group. She was named to the MarketWatch 25 list in 2025.

== Personal life ==
Sundberg married in April 2025. The couple met on Hinge. She lives in South Slope, Brooklyn.

Around 2019, Sundberg began researching the history of Gardiners Island, an estate near her Long Island hometown. Assisted by friends in the film industry, she directed and released a documentary about the island and its owner, Robert David Lion Gardiner, in 2022.
