= Gardner D. Stout =

American banker and naturalist (1903-1984)

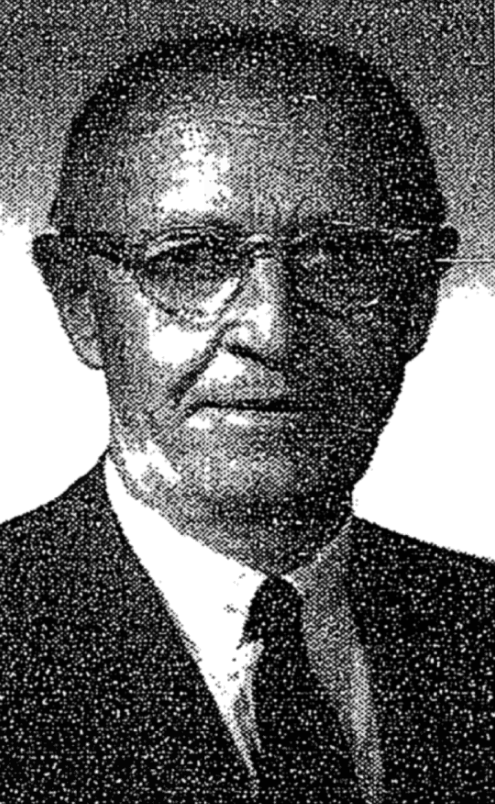
- Undated photograph of Stout by Fabian Bachrach

President of the American Museum of Natural History
- In office 1968–1975
- Preceded by: Alexander M. White
- Succeeded by: Robert Guestier Goelet

Personal details
- Born: April 21, 1903 New York City, U.S.
- Died: January 16, 1984 (aged 80) Stamford, Connecticut, U.S.
- Spouse: Clare Kellogg (m. 1930)
- Education: Yale University
- Occupation: Banker; naturalist

Gardner Dominick Stout (April 21, 1903 – January 16, 1984) was an American banker and naturalist. He was president of the American Museum of Natural History from 1968 to 1975 and was partner at his family firm Dominick and Dominick for several decades before becoming president.

== Biography ==
Stout was born on April 21, 1903 in Manhattan. His parents were Ethel Gardner Dominick, a trustee of Monmouth Memorial Hospital, and Andrew Varick Stout, a stockbroker who was senior partner at investment banking firm Dominick and Dominick. His maternal uncle was Senator H. Alexander Smith, who married Ethel's sister Helen, and his first cousin was writer Helen Smith Shoemaker. His ancestors also included the Bayard family, as well as New York City post-colonial figure Richard Varick.

Stout attended Yale University, where he graduated cum laude in 1926. In 1928, he bought a New York Stock Exchange seat for $335,000, one of the highest prices at the time, and became a partner at his father’s firm. He was promoted to president in 1964 and executive board chair in 1967, before retiring in 1968. He also served as president of the Dominick Fund.

In addition to his career in finance, Stout had a career as a naturalist. His visits as a naturalist included Cape Cod, the Great Barrier Reef, the Jamaica Bay Wildlife Refuge, and the Outer Banks, as well as other places in Africa and Central America. He was particularly interested in birds, and he chaired the National Audubon Society’s executive committee from 1946 until 1958. He was also editor of The Shorebirds of North America (1967), which he also sponsored.

In 1959, Stout became a trustee of the American Museum of Natural History. In 1968, he was appointed president of the museum, serving until 1975. The Museum opened several halls, centers, and wings under his leadership, including the Alexander M. White Natural Science Center, the Childs Frick Building, the Frederick H. Leonhardt People Center, the Hall of Mexico and Central America, the Hall of Man in Africa, the Hall of Mollusks and Mankind, the Irma and Paul Milstein Family Hall of Ocean Life, the Margaret Mead Hall of Pacific Peoples, and the Hayden Planetarium’s Perkin Wing. He envisioned the Museum as an integral part of environmentalism, explaining that “because the Museum has such large and varied collections, and because many of the species represented in our collections are now extinct, we occupy a very special position in assessing the threat that man has posed to all living things, including himself;” to this end he helped the Museum set up their Can Man Survive? exhibit. In 1969, he helped the Museum raise $22 million as part of their centennial.

On August 9, 1930, Stout married Clare Kellogg, daughter of New York Stock Exchange governor John Prentice Kellogg; also a naturalist, she specialized in mollusks. The couple had three sons, including naturalist Prentice K. Stout. During World War II, he enlisted in the United States Navy and served as a staff operations officer on the Seventh Fleet; he was discharged as commander in 1946. As of 1968, he lived in New Canaan, Connecticut.

Stout was awarded honorary doctorates by Pace University (1969) and New York University (1975), as well as the Bronze Medallion. Mayor Abraham Beame called Stout "one of the Museum’s most valuable treasures". The Museum’s Stout Hall of the Asian Peoples was also named in his honor.

Stout died on January 16, 1984 at a nursing home in Stamford, Connecticut.
