= Alexandra Gardiner Creel =

Member of the Gardiner family

Alexandra Gardiner Creel at the Opera

Alexandra Gardiner Creel (February 7, 1910 - December 19, 1990) was a member of the Gardiner family, who were prominent bankers and landowners, known for their ownership of 3,300-acre (13 km^{2}) Gardiners Island, located off the eastern tip of Long Island, New York.

== Early life and education ==
Creel was born on February 7, 1910, in New York City, to Robert Alexander Gardiner (1863-1919) and Nora Loftus, a native of County Kilkenny in Ireland. Her brother, Robert David Lion Gardiner (1911-2004), co-owned (with Alexandra Gardiner Creel), Gardiners Island, New York, who died without leaving any biological children.

Her father's estate in 1919, was estimated at $1,000,000 in a trust to raise her and her elder brother. In 1921, her mother went to court to challenge the terms of the trust, claiming she was not able to maintain her children with the funds the managers released.

== Life ==
In 1932, Gardiner quietly married James Randall Creel (1904-1990), a judge of the New York City Criminal Court, which was reported by The New York Times, without telling her family. They reported her mother confronted the minister who performed the marriage, and she was so upset she had to be calmed by the Chief of Police.

Her aunt Sarah Diodati Gardiner, who had purchased Gardiners Island from her cousin Winthrop Gardiner Jr., in 1936, created a trust so she could leave the island to her and her brother, Robert David Lion Gardiner. The trust would pay the taxes and costs to maintain the property, but the terms of the trust did not allow them to sell the Island. Alexandra and Robert became the beneficiaries of the trust upon their aunt's death in January 1953. The trust's money was depleted in the 1970s.

Alexandra's death left a long-running dispute between her brother and her daughter Alexandra Creel Goelet over the future of the island, which the Gardiner family first acquired in a manorial grant from the King of England in 1639.

== Personal life ==
Creel had two children with James Randall Creel:

- James Randall Creel, III (1934-1988), who married Diana Forman (later known as Diana F. Colgate; 1939-2024), and had the following children;
  - James Randall "Jamie" Creel (b. circa 1965), who owns Creel and Gow, a curiosity shop in New York City and Millbrook, New York
  - Lawrence Gardiner Creel (b. 1963), a partner at Edgewood Management Company in New York City
- Alexandra Gardiner Creel (born 1940), married Robert Guestier Goelet (1923-2019), a philanthropist of French origin, with whom she had the following children;
  - Alexandra Gardiner Goelet (b. c. 1977), who runs the family investment office along with her younger brother Robert.
  - Robert Gardiner Goelet (b. c. 1979), a former project manager for the Lower Manhattan Development Corporation.
