= Peter F. Tufo =

American diplomat (born 1938)

Peter Francis Tufo
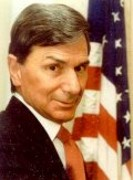
- Ambassador Tufo
- Born: April 19, 1938 (age 88); Chicago, Illinois, U.S.
- Education: Beloit College (1959) Yale Law School
- Occupations: Attorney, civil servant
- Spouses: Alexandra Creel Goelet (m. 1964, divorced); Francesca Stanfill (m. 1983, divorced) Maya Rana Tufo (m. 2002)

Peter Francis Tufo (born April 19, 1938) is an American former diplomat who served as the U.S. Ambassador to Hungary from 1997 to 2001, and helped found the law firm Tufo, Johnston & Zuccotti in 1970.

== Biography ==
Prior to his appointment as U.S. Ambassador to Hungary, Peter Tufo was with the law firm of Milbank, Tweed, Hadley & McCloy in New York City, specializing in mergers and acquisitions and corporate finance. Until 1996 he was a managing director of Investment Banking at Merrill Lynch & Co. advising on domestic and international corporate financing, focusing particularly on developing nations in Asia. Prior to joining Merrill Lynch, Tufo was Senior Advisor at Lazard Freres & Co., where he specialized in mergers and acquisitions and financial advisory work. He has lived in Europe and has worked and traveled extensively in Asia since 1970. In 1994 and 1995, he was a keynote speaker at The Economist magazine Asian infrastructure financing conferences in Hong Kong and Beijing.

From 1989 to 1996, Tufo also served as unpaid chairman and chief executive officer of the New York State Thruway Authority, the largest toll road and bridge system in the U.S. Under his leadership, the Thruway Authority completed a $2,000 million new construction program, took over and revitalized the 551 miles (887 km) New York State Canal System, undertook major transportation-related economic development projects throughout New York State, and completed over $5,000 million of infrastructure financings for New York State. In addition, the Authority privatized various services through public/private partnerships with the Marriott Corporation and McDonald's Corporation investing $175 million to build 26 new travel plazas. Under Tufo the Authority also developed and installed E-ZPass statewide, the nation's first non-stop electronic toll collection system.

== Early career ==
Following graduation from the Yale Law School and Beloit College, Tufo served in the United States Marine Corps. Thereafter, he joined the New York City law firm of Davis Polk & Wardwell as a corporate litigator. At the request of then-Mayor John Lindsay, he took a leave of absence from Davis Polk & Wardwell to lead investigations into corruption in city government as chief counsel to the New York City Department of Investigation. Subsequently, he was appointed Assistant to the Mayor for federal affairs and established the City's first office in Washington where he worked for three years with the Congress and the White House to pass major urban and civil rights legislation.

Tufo returned to the practice of law when he, Joseph F. Johnston, and John Zuccotti, his colleagues from Davis, Polk, founded the firm of Tufo Johnston & Zuccotti in 1970 (later Tufo + Zuccotti). Over 15 years they built it into a thriving mid-size law firm which the American Lawyer has described as "one of the classiest, most successful firms in the country". The firm specialized in complex financial and urban land use matters. The firm Tufo + Zuccotti merged with Brown & Wood in 1986 and Tufo subsequently joined Milbank, Tweed, Hadley & McCloy.

Tufo has intertwined his professional life with public service. In 1975, he was appointed Chairman of the New York City Board of Correction, which oversees parts of the city's criminal justice system. He was reappointed for a second term in 1979 by Mayor Koch, serving a total of 10 years as unpaid Chairman. In recommending his appointment, The New York Times editorially praised him as "a highly qualified and experienced citizen who has strong credentials for this important post".

In 1975, Tufo warned of an impending riot at the Rikers Island prison complex and when it occurred and hostages were taken, he and Commissioner Benjamin Malcolm crawled through tear gas into prisoner-held territory, established a truce, negotiated release of the hostages, and ended the rebellion. The New York Times editorialized, "because of the courage of these men, no lives were lost".

Subsequently, Tufo increased the investigative and regulatory power of the Board by a public referendum amending the City charter. This enabled the Board to establish enforceable working and living standards for the 3,000 correction officers and 20,000 detainees in the city's correction system.

Thereafter, Tufo served as on-camera host and commentator for the award-winning Metromedia television documentary series, The Cost of Crime, which analyzed the problems of the New York criminal justice system in seven one-hour Sunday night special programs. Two years later, following appointment to the New York City Commission on Education, Tufo received an Emmy from the American Academy of Television Arts and Sciences for his role as host and commentator in "Save our Schools", a Metromedia television documentary series on the problems of urban public education nationwide.

He has been a director of public companies and has held numerous board positions with civic and educational institutions. He is a past president of the Yale Law School Association, and in 1987 was awarded an honorary doctorate by the Graduate School of the City University. Tufo concluded his service as Ambassador to Hungary on March 1, 2001.

== Personal life ==
Tufo married Alexandra Creel Goelet, future heiress to historic Gardiners Island, on December 10, 1964. In 1976, when Alexandra remarried, The New York Times noted Tufo was a frequent escort to Lee Radziwill, the elegant sister of former First Lady Jacqueline Bouvier Kennedy Onassis. In 1983, he married Francesca Stanfill, daughter of Dennis Carothers Stanfill, former chairman of 20th Century Fox Film Corporation; they later divorced. Tufo married Maya Rana, daughter of Prabhakar SJB Rana, a Nepalese industrialist and then an economic adviser to King Gyanendra.

Diplomatic posts
Preceded by Donald M. Blinken	United States Ambassador to Hungary; 1997–2001	Succeeded by Nancy Goodman Brinker
