= Lion Gardiner =

English engineer and colonist

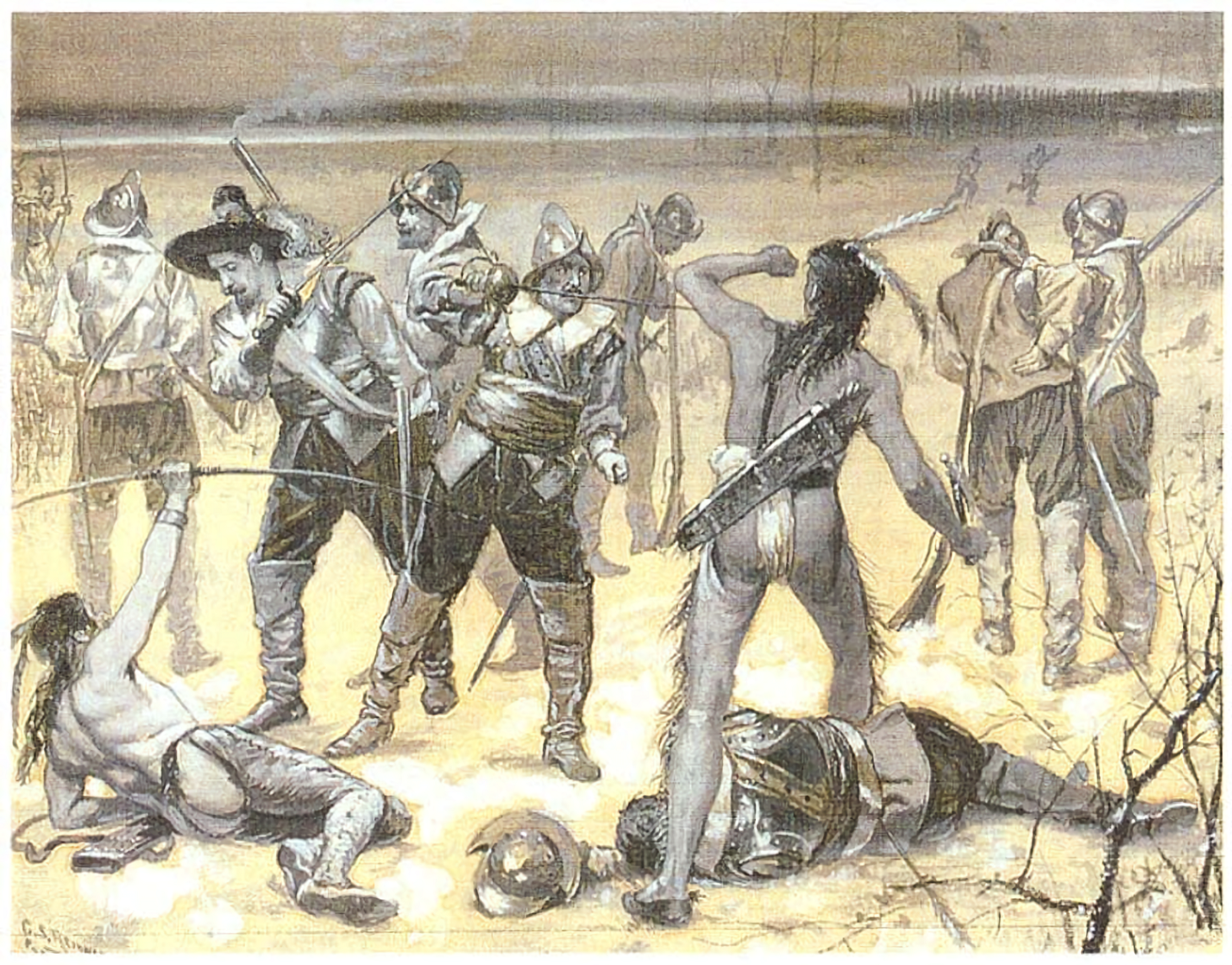
- Lion Gardiner (center, facing) in the Pequot War, by Charles Stanley Reinhart (painted circa 1890)
- Born: 1599; England
- Died: 1663 (aged 63–64); East Hampton, New York
- Resting place: South End Cemetery by Town Pond
- Occupations: military engineer, settler, soldier
- Spouse: Mary Willemsen Deurcant
- Children: David; Mary; Elizabeth
- Relatives: Julia Gardiner Tyler (fifth great-granddaughter)

Lion Gardiner (1599–1663) was an English engineer and colonist who founded the first English settlement in New York, acquiring land on eastern Long Island. He had been working in the Netherlands and was hired to construct fortifications on the Connecticut River, for the Connecticut Colony. His legacy includes Gardiners Island, which is held by his descendants.

== Early life ==
Lion Gardiner was born in England in 1599. He and his wife Mary left Woerden in the Netherlands and embarked for New England on the ship Batcheler on July 10, 1635. The ship arrived at Boston at the end of November in 1635.

Governor John Winthrop noted Gardiner's arrival in his Journal under the date November 28:

Here arrived a small Norsey bark of twenty-five tons sent by Lords Say, etc, with one Gardiner, an expert engineer or work base, and provisions of all sorts, to begin a fort at the mouth of the Connecticut. She came through many great tempests; yet, through the Lord's great providence, her passengers, twelve men, two women, and all goods, all safe.

== Career ==
Gardiner was a military engineer in service of the Prince of Orange in the Netherlands along with John Mason. He was hired by the Connecticut Company in 1635 to oversee construction of fortifications in Connecticut Colony. He finished and commanded the Saybrook Fort at the mouth of the Connecticut River during the Pequot War of 1636–37.

In 1639, he purchased an island from Poggaticut the Grand Sachem of the Montaukett tribe, which they called Manchonat, located between the North and South forks of eastern Long Island, in what is now Suffolk County, New York. The original grant by which he acquired proprietary rights in the island made it an entirely separate and independent plantation. It was not connected to either Connecticut Colony or New Amsterdam. He was empowered to draft laws for church and state. He called it the Isle of Wight, but it is now known as Gardiners Island after him. He became patron to the sachem's younger brother Wyandanch and in 1659 was deeded Smithtown, NY as a gift of the sachem, for being a friend to all the indians of Paumanacke when the tribe was on the verge of being wiped out.

In 1660, Gardiner wrote the firsthand account Relation of the Pequot Warres. The manuscript was lost among various state archives and rediscovered in 1809; it was first published in 1833.

In 1930 a statue of Gardiner was dedicated in Fort Saybrook Memorial Park in Old Saybrook, Connecticut.

== Personal life ==
Coat of Arms of Lion Gardiner

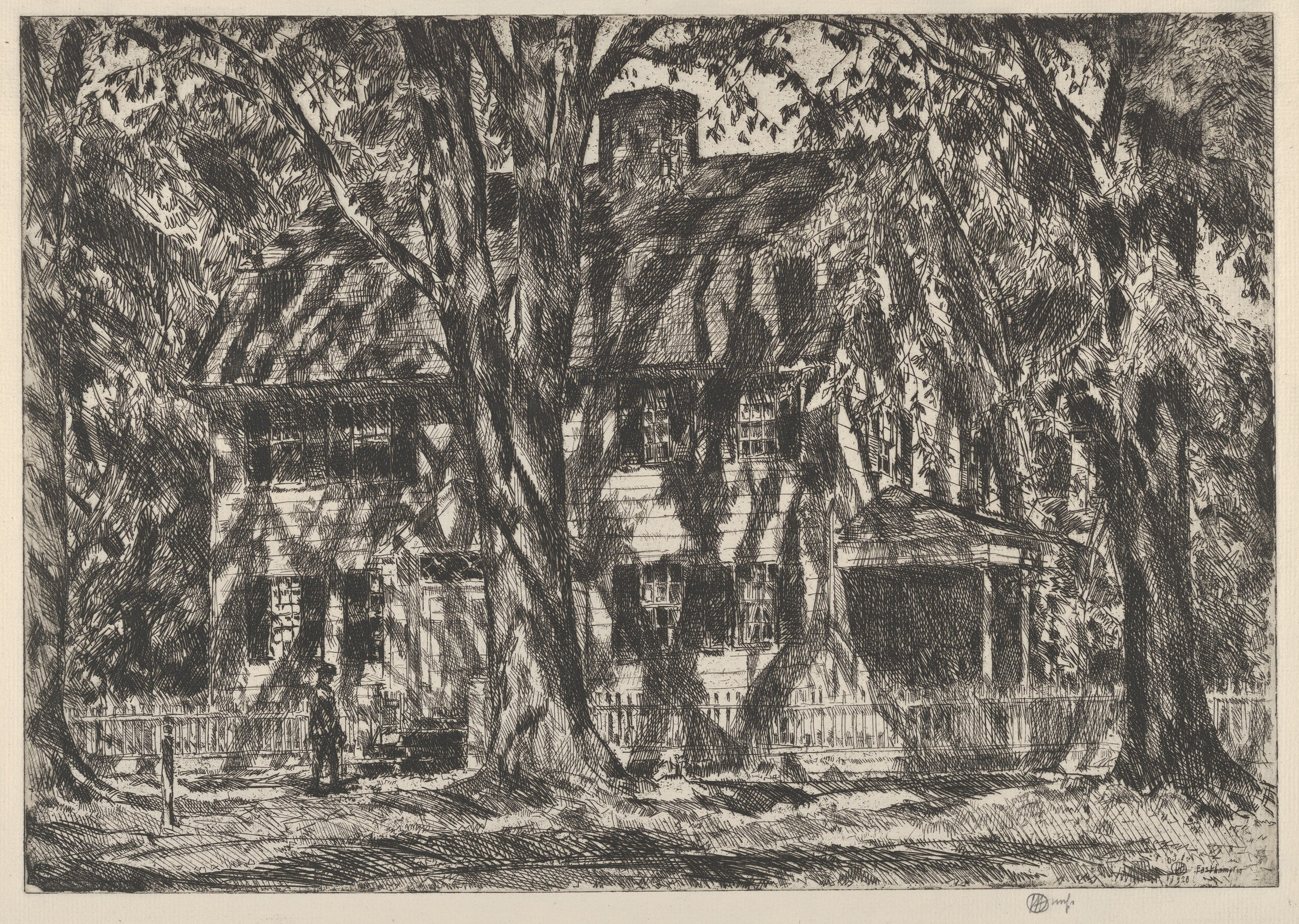
Print of the Lion Gardiner House, Easthampton (Childe Hassam – 1920)

Shortly before departing from the Netherlands, he married Mary Willemsen Deurcant, the daughter of Dericke Willemsen Deurcant and Hachin Bastiens, who was born at Woerden about 1601. She died in 1665 in East Hampton, New York. They were the parents of three children:

- David was born on April 29, 1636, at Saybrook. He married on June 4, 1657, Mary Leringman, a widow, at St. Margaret's Parish in the City of Westminster, England.
- Mary was born on August 30, 1638, at Saybrook, Connecticut. She married in 1658, Jeremiah Conkling, the son of Ananias Conkling, who was from Nottinghamshire, England.
- Elizabeth was born on September 14, 1641, at Gardiners Island, New York. She married in 1657, Arthur Howell, a son of Edward Howell of Southampton, Long Island. Her death led to the witchcraft trial of Elizabeth Garlick.

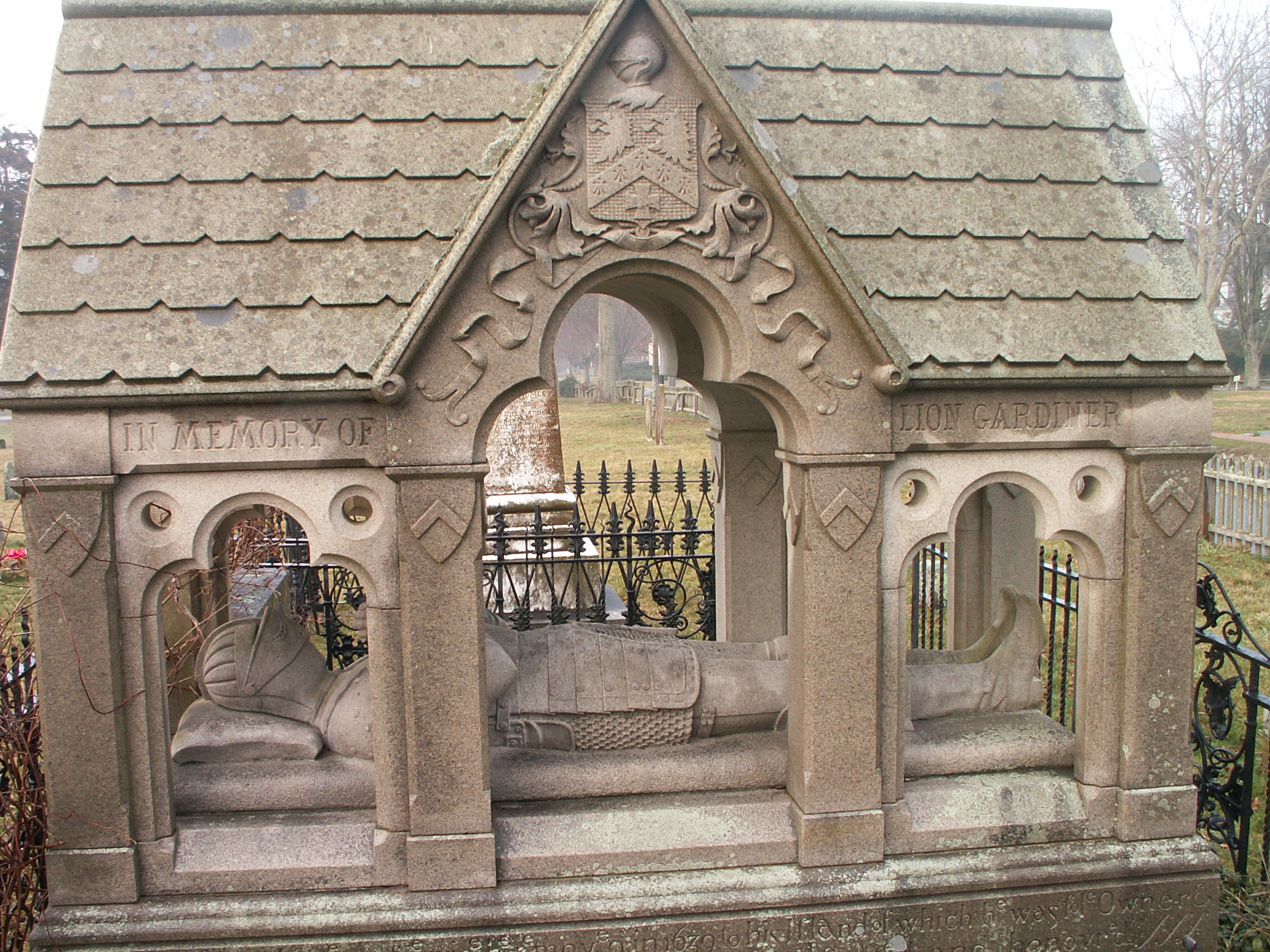
The tomb of Lion Gardiner in East Hampton, New York was built in 1886 and designed by James Renwick Jr. It depicts him in recumbent effigy. (Photo, April 2006)

Lion Gardiner was buried in East Hampton, New York. A tombstone with a recumbent effigy was erected in his memory in 1886.

=== Descendants ===
Lion Gardiner's descendants number in the thousands in the 21st century. Some of his notable descendants include:

- David Gardiner, New York State Senator, father of Julia Gardiner Tyler
- Julia Gardiner Tyler, second wife of President John Tyler; First Lady of the United States from June 26, 1844, to March 4, 1845
- Mary Gardiner Horsford, poet and wife of chemist Eben Norton Horsford
- Gardiner Greene Hubbard, lawyer, financier, and philanthropist. He was one of the founders of the Bell Telephone Company and first president of the National Geographic Society.
- Aaron Bancroft, clergyman, married Lucretia Chandler
- Eliza Bancroft, married John Davis, lawyer, businessman and governor of Massachusetts
- George Bancroft, historian and statesman
- Chevalier Benjamin C. Bradlee, vice president-at-large of The Washington Post, executive editor of The Washington Post during the Watergate scandal.
- Quinn Bradlee, author, founder and CEO of FriendsOfQuinn.com
- Alfred Conkling, U.S. Representative, judge of the District Court for the Northern District of New York, U.S. Minister to Mexico
- Roscoe Conkling, U.S. Senator, Republican political boss from New York
- Alfred Conkling Coxe Sr., judge of the District Court for the Northern District of New York and later the Court of Appeals for the Second Circuit, author
- Alfred Conkling Coxe Jr., judge of the District Court for the Southern District of New York
- Louis O. Coxe, poet, playwright, and professor from Maine; best known for the Broadway version of Billy Budd
- Bancroft Davis, married Frederika Gore King, daughter of U.S. Representative James Gore King
- Horace Davis, a United States Representative from California
- Henry Cabot Lodge Jr., Republican United States Senator from Massachusetts; U.S. Ambassador to the United Nations, Ambassador to South Vietnam, Ambassador to West Germany; Special Envoy to the Holy See; 1960 Republican nominee for Vice President
- George C. Lodge, the Jaime and Josefina Chua Tiampo Professor of Business Administration Emeritus at Harvard Business School
- John Davis Lodge, actor, Republican politician; U.S. Representative; governor of Connecticut; ambassador to Spain, Argentina, and Switzerland
- John Gardiner Calkins Brainard, lawyer, editor and poet.
- Gilbert Melville Grosvenor, is past president and chief executive of the National Geographic Society, as well as a former editor of National Geographic Magazine.
- Melville Bell Grosvenor, was the president of the National Geographic Society and editor of National Geographic Magazine from 1957 to 1969.
- Mabel Gardiner Hubbard married Alexander Graham Bell, an eminent scientist, inventor, engineer and innovator who is credited with inventing the first practical telephone.
- Winthrop Gardiner Jr., the 14th Proprietor of Gardiners Island. He married Norwegian figure skater and actress, Sonja Henie, after his divorce from actress Mildred Shay.
- Gertrude Van Cortlandt Wells, married Schuyler Hamilton Jr., the son of Schuyler Hamilton and great-grandson of Alexander Hamilton
- Maxwell Perkins, book editor who discovered authors such as Ernest Hemingway and F. Scott Fitzgerald
- Perry King, grandson of Maxwell Perkins, actor
- Selah Brewster Strong, lawyer and politician from New York
- Marcius D. Raymond, publisher, writer, genealogist, editor, historian
- David Thomson, 3rd Baron Thomson of Fleet, Canadian billionaire and art collector
- Kenneth Thomson, 2nd Baron Thomson of Fleet, Canadian billionaire, art collector, and philanthropist
- Roy Thomson, 1st Baron Thomson of Fleet, Canadian businessman
- David Gardiner Tyler, Democratic lawyer and politician, Virginia State Senator, U.S. Representative, son of president John Tyler
- Lyon Gardiner Tyler, educator and historian, another son of president John Tyler
- Robert David Lion Gardiner, Columbia College (1934), once an owner of Gardiners Island and "... the 16th Lord of the Manor ...".
- Alexandra Creel Goelet, current owner of Gardiners Island. The Goelets offered to place a conservation easement on the island in exchange for a promise from the town of East Hampton not to up-zone the land, change its assessment, or attempt to acquire it by condemnation. The Goelets and East Hampton agreed upon the easement through 2025.

== Bibliography ==
- Dunn, Richard The journal of John Winthrop, 1630–1649.Abridged Edition: published by Harvard University Press
- Gardiner, Curtiss C. Lion Gardiner, and his descendants with Illustrations 1599–1890. St. Louis, Missouri : A.Whipple, publisher
