= Wyandance =

Wyandance may refer to:

- Wyandance, an alternative spelling of Wyandanch (sachem) (ca. 1620-1660), a sachem of the Montaukett Indians
- Wyandance, the former name of the town of Wyandanch, New York
- USS Wyandance (SP-359), a United States Navy patrol boat in commission from 1917 to 1918
