= Sagtikos Manor =

Historic house in New York, United States

- U.S. National Register of Historic Places
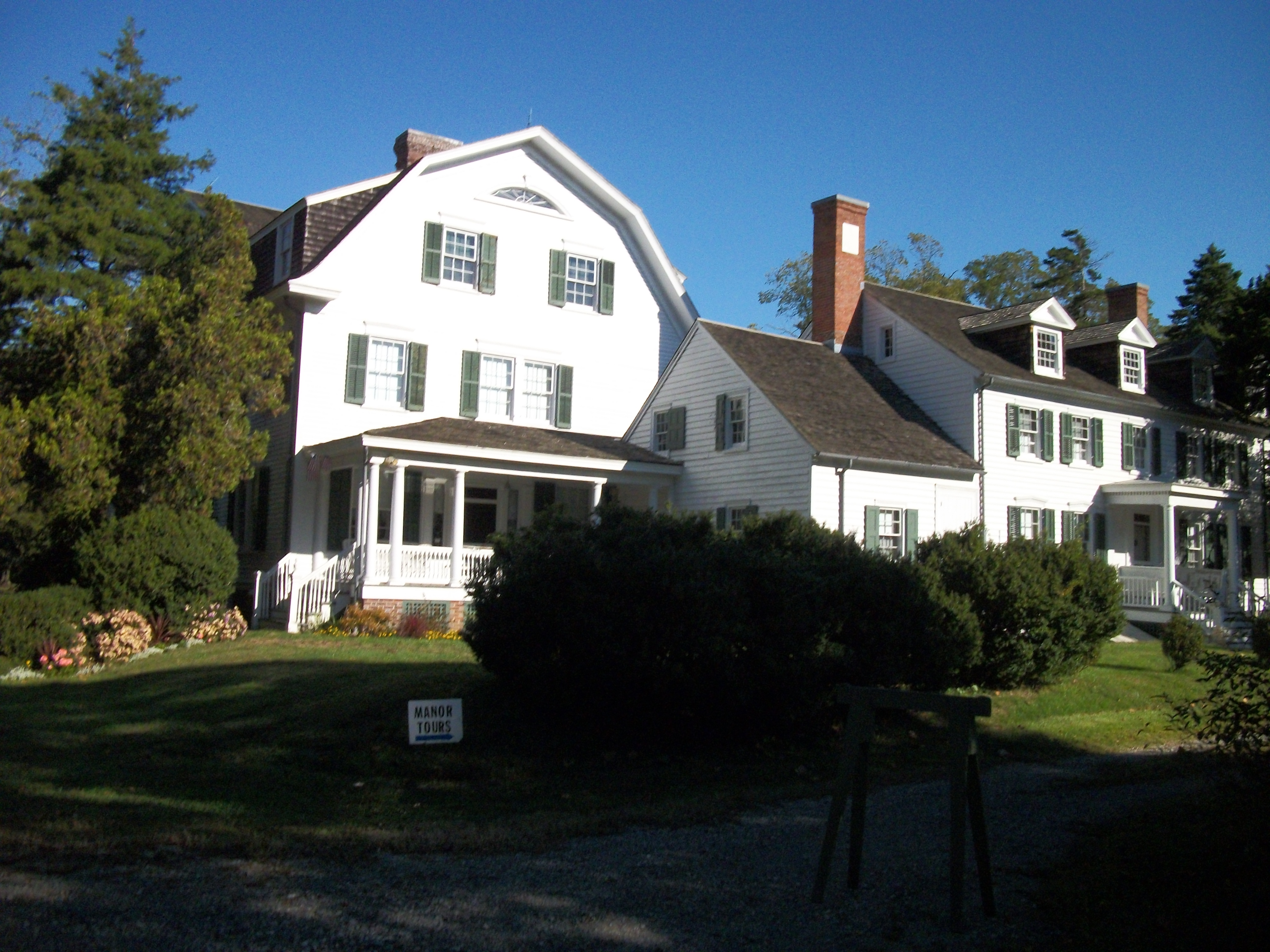
- Sagtikos Manor as seen from within the driveway on NY 27A.

- Location within New York Location within the United States
- Location: Montauk Hwy. (NY 27A), West Bay Shore, New York
- Coordinates: 40°42′10″N 73°16′36″W
- Area: 10 acres (4.0 ha)
- Built: c. 1697
- Architect: Green, Isaac
- Architectural style: Colonial Revival
- NRHP reference No.: 76001284
- Added to NRHP: November 21, 1976

Sagtikos Manor, on Long Island

Sagtikos Manor is a historic home located in West Bay Shore, Suffolk County, New York. It is a long, eclectic structure which has been extensively enlarged by additions and alterations during its long and active life as a residence. The original section was built around 1697 and is a 1 1/2-story, timber-framed structure with a gable roof. Additions occurred through the early 20th century. Also on the property is a carriage house, caretaker's cottage, buttery, potting shed, formal gardens, and Thompson-Gardiner family cemetery. "Sagtikos" is an Algonquian word meaning "head of the hissing snake," a reference to a small stream on the property.

The property was first patented to Stephanus Van Cortlandt (1643–1700), who built the original house. During the 18th through 20th centuries, it was owned by the prominent Thompson and Gardiner families. The manor functioned for a time during the American Revolution as local headquarters for British forces under General Sir Henry Clinton. In 1790, George Washington recorded in his diary an overnight stop at "Squire Thompson's" during his tour of Long Island. It is operated by The Sagtikos Manor Historical Society and was added to the National Register of Historic Places in 1976.

Robert David Lion Gardiner inherited the property in 1930 and allowed the newly created Sagtikos Manor Historical Society to use the property in 1964.

In 2012 the Historical Society sued the Robert David Lion Gardiner Foundation. They argued that Gardiner had intended that part of his estate should go to support the maintenance of the property. However, since his will did not specifically name the Society, the courts ruled the Society did not have standing, could not even request an audit of the Foundation's finances. The Society had been looking for $65,000 per year.
