= Alexandra Creel Goelet =

American heiress and forester

- Born: Alexandra Gardiner Creel; November 22, 1939 (age 86)
- Education: Yale School of Forestry; Barnard College
- Occupation: Forester
- Known for: Owning a historic estate on an island off Long Island
- Spouse: Robert Guestier Goelet
- Children: 2
- Mother: Alexandra Gardiner Creel
- Relatives: Robert David Lion Gardiner (uncle)

Alexandra Creel Goelet is an American heiress and forester. She inherited and owns the 5.19 sq mi (13.4 km^{2}) Gardiner's Island, off Long Island, New York.

== Early life, family and education ==
Her mother was Alexandra Gardiner Creel, and her father was Raymond J. Randall Creel. Her grandparents were Mr. and Mrs. Robert Alexander Gardiner and Mr. and Mrs. James Randall Creel. Her uncle was Robert David Lion Gardiner. She had a brother, Raymond J. Randall Creel Jr.

After earning a bachelor's degree from Barnard College, Alexandra Creel studied at the Yale School of Forestry, enabling her to make informed decisions in managing the forests on Gardiner's Island.

== Gardiner Island ==
When Alexandra's mother Alexandra Gardiner Creel and uncle Robert David Lion Gardiner inherited Gardiner's Island from their aunt Sarah Diodati Gardiner in 1953, that aunt had set up a trust fund to maintain the Island. That trust was exhausted in 1977. Due to disputes with her uncle, he declined to pay a share of the Island's upkeep — then more than $1 million per year. Goelet and her husband paid the entire cost of the property's maintenance. They went to court to have him barred from visiting the Island.

Her uncle maintained, for the last decades of his life, that when he died, she and her husband would ruin the island, by selling it to developers, or developing it themselves. His distrust grew so great he tried finding a distant relative he could officially adopt, to inherit his share of the Island, who would oppose their plans. When he failed to find a relative who measured up to his standards, he said he would work to have the island expropriated by the government.

In 1986, four years prior to their mother's death, her brother Raymond J. Randall Creel Jr., who had experienced health concerns, offered to sell his interest in Gardiner's Island to Alexandra and Robert.

Goelet's uncle, Robert David Lion Gardiner, and Goelet's mother, who died in 1990, each inherited half of the Island.

On September 7, 2000, the East Hampton Star described Alexandra Creel Goelet as being "estranged" from her uncle Robert David Lion Gardiner, who was then the heir to the estate. The paper described hearings before the East Hampton town council, held in the East Hampton firehall, where Goelet's 89-year-old uncle, and she and her husband and son, presented two alternate proposals to the town council. Gardiner urged the town council to designate the island a "historic district". Goelet's team urged the council to leave the island's zoning as-is. They assured the council that the trust established to maintain the island had enough resources to last 50 years.

Upon the death of her uncle, in 2004, Goelet became the sole owner of the island.

The island's current zoning would allow the owners to split the property into one-acre lots. Her uncle had requested it to be rezoned into five-acre lots. Goelet and her husband opposed the rezoning, because it would lower the value of the property. They explained they weren't worried about the property's resale value, except that a rezoning that lowered its value would make government expropriation easier. They felt their family would be better stewards of the property, than if it were turned into a government park or wildlife sanctuary.

== Personal life ==
She married Peter Francis Tufo, a lawyer and real estate developer, on December 10, 1964. That marriage ended in divorce. She returned to college after her divorce.

In 1974, she met Robert Guestier Goelet, also from a wealthy family, who became her second husband. The couple married on Gardiner's Island in 1976. Their two children were born in the late 1970s; their daughter, Alexandra Gardiner Goelet, is about two years older than their son, Robert Gardiner Goelet.
