= Great Jones =

American property management company

- Industry: Property management
- Founders: Jay Goldklang; Abigail Besdin; David Diaz
- Headquarters: Tampa Bay, Florida, United States
- Website: greatjones.co

Great Jones is an American property management firm. The company develops technology that allows homeowners to manage their rental homes via smartphone or the internet, acting as a group purchasing organization (GPO) through consolidated purchasing for materials used in property maintenance.

In 2018, the company raised $8 million in Series A financing from Crosslink Capital, Juxtapose, and entrepreneurs such as Seamless founder Jason Finger, Kevin Ryan and David Rosenblatt.

The firm manages more than 1,000 properties valued at more than $150m in locations from Naples to Jacksonville.
