= Robert David Lion Gardiner =

American war veteran

- Born: May 25, 1911; New York, U.S.
- Died: August 23, 2004 (aged 93); East Hampton, New York, U.S.
- Education: St. George's School; Columbia College; New York University School of Law
- Known for: Heir to Gardiner's Island
- Spouse: Eunice Bailey Oakes (m. 1961)
- Relatives: Alexandra Creel Goelet (niece)

Robert David Lion Gardiner (February 25, 1911 – August 23, 2004), was the last heir to Gardiner's Island to have the surname "Gardiner". (His niece Alexandra Creel Goelet, was co-owner, until his death, and is now sole owner.) He was the 16th Lord of the Manor.

== Early life ==
Gardiner was born in New York City on February 25, 1911 to Robert Alexander Gardiner (1863-1919) and Nora Loftus, a native of County Kilkenny in Ireland. She was the sister of Captain Francis Cochrane Loftus (1873-1899) who was killed in the Boer War.

Robert Gardiner attended St. George's School in Newport, Rhode Island. He attended Columbia College and graduated in 1934. He then attended New York University School of Law.

== Career ==
He served as a lieutenant in the United States Navy in the South West Pacific theatre during World War II. Gardiner worked on Wall Street, for the Empire Trust Company and owned a 42-acre shopping center in Islip, New York.

In 1937 he became a member of the New Hampshire Society of the Cincinnati.

=== Gardiner family properties ===
He and his sister Alexandra Gardiner Creel inherited Gardiner's Island from their aunt, Sarah Diodati Gardiner, when she died in 1953. Gardiner had long-running disputes with his sister, and her daughter, Alexandra Creel Goelet. Goelet and her husband were conservationists, while Gardiner was an enthusiastic hunter. From 1953, when Gardiner and his sister inherited the Island, until 1977, the Island's operating costs had been covered by a trust set up by the aunt from whom they inherited the property.

Due to their disputes, Gardiner refused to contribute to the taxes and other costs of maintaining the property–which, at that time, were more than $1 million per year. He didn't contribute for over a decade. They, in turn, went to court to bar him from visiting the property.

In 1971, Representative Otis Pike proposed a bill to expropriate Gardiners Island, to turn it into a Federal National Monument. Gardiner complained that the proposal to expropriate his family's property was unfair, when the Rockefeller family had been allowed to continue to own their Pocantico Hills estate.

Gardiner inherited Sagtikos Manor, a 10-acre heritage property on Long Island. Gardiner inherited the property, which had been in his family since the 18th century, in the 1930s. Gardiner and his wife Eunice used the property as their primary residence for several years, early in their marriage. In 1963, when the Sagtikos Manor Historical Society was founded, the Gardiners stopped using it as their primary residence, let the Historical Society use part of the structure, but insisted the Historical Society reserve a suite for him. The property was placed on the National Register of Historic Places in the 1970s. In 1986, Gardiner transferred ownership of the property to the nonprofit Robert David Lion Gardiner Foundation. Today, Sagtikos Manor stands as a small museum rich in historical value to the American Revolution and its era onward.

== Personal life ==
In 1961, Gardiner married Eunice Bailey Oakes (1928–2011), a former British model, at St. Thomas Church on Fifth Avenue in Manhattan. Eunice, who was previously married to William Pitt Oakes (a son of Sir Harry Oakes, William died of an overdose at 28), was significantly younger than he was, but the couple's marriage yielded no children. In the 1980s Gardiner tried to adopt a distant relative, so he would have an heir who could continue inherit his share of the Island, and keep it in the Gardiner name. But those efforts failed, since he was looking for a relative who was already wealthy, who, nevertheless, would agree to his conditions as to how Gardiner's Island was managed, after his death.

His niece, Alexandra Creel Goelet, had already inherited his sister's half of the estate, and inherited Gardiner's half upon his death through court. Gardiner and his niece were estranged. They engaged in arduous litigation against one another over the Gardiner Estate's fund and ownership of equity such as Gardiner's Island and Sagtikos Manor which had originally been meant to be preserved for the family's history.

Gardiner was known for being quite gregarious and flamboyant. Later historians have speculated that he may have been gay.

== In popular culture ==
The long running dispute between Gardiner and his niece formed part of the background to Chrystle Fiedler's 2015 mystery novel Garden of Death. He is also mentioned in Nelson DeMille's novel, The Gold Coast.

Writer Emily Sundberg heavily features archival footage of, and interviews about, Gardiner, in her 2022 documentary on Gardiners Island entitled "THE END: A Gardiner's Island Story."
