= Wyandanch (sachem) =

American native leader (c. 1571–1659)

Montaukett leader

Personal details
- Born: c. 1571
- Died: 1659 (aged 87–88)
- Resting place: New York, United States

Wyandanch (c. 1571 – 1659) was a sachem of the Montaukett Indians in the mid-17th century on eastern Long Island. Initially he was a minor chief among the Montaukett, but due to his skillful manipulation of various alliances and his accommodating stance towards the European colonists who gave him substantial military and economic support, he eventually became an influential "alliance chief" (a sachem who was responsible for maintaining friendly relations between his tribe and the settlers).

== Early life ==
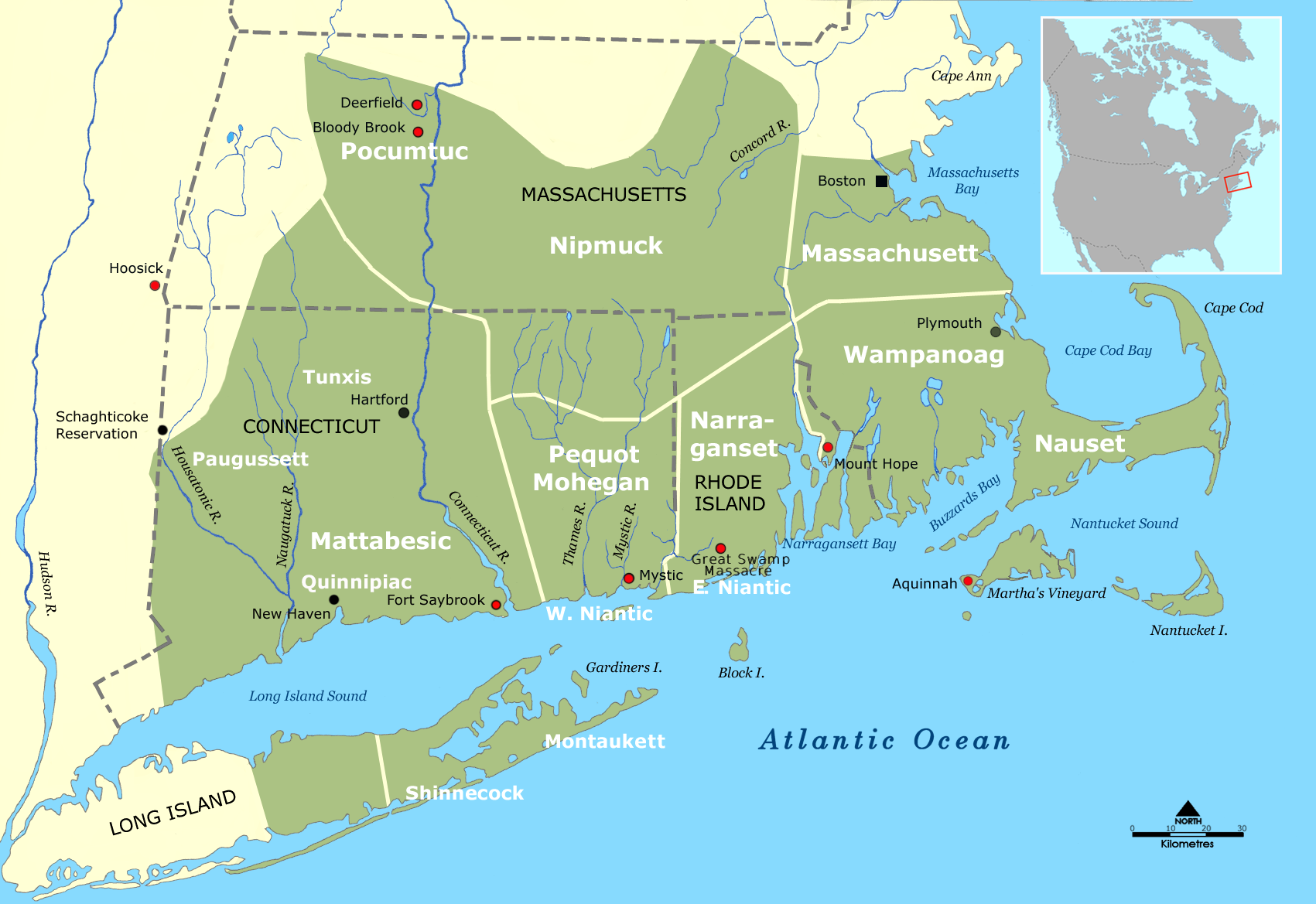
Tribal territories in Southern New England circa 1600

Wyandanch (sometimes spelled as Wyandance or Wayandance) was born on Long Island roughly at the time of the pilgrims' arrival at Plymouth in present-day Massachusetts. While still young, in the second half of the 1630s Wyandanch heard about the almost total destruction of the Pequot in the Pequot War. He concluded that it was best to come to an understanding with the English colonists in southern New England and on Long Island.

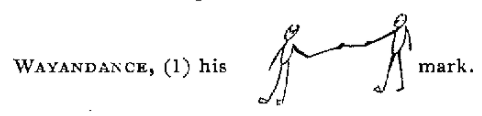
Signature of Wyandanch/Wayandance as he gifts Lion Gardiner a piece of land. Dated July 14. 1659

== Three-way power struggle ==
Throughout most of the mid-17th century, Wyandanch was involved in a three-way political, and occasionally military, struggle against the famous Mohegan sachem Uncas and the Niantic sachem Ninigret. Acting with the support of the colonists, Wyandanch was able to resist the Native American pressures. He kept his tribe in relation to the colonists.

== Miantonomoh's plan and war ==
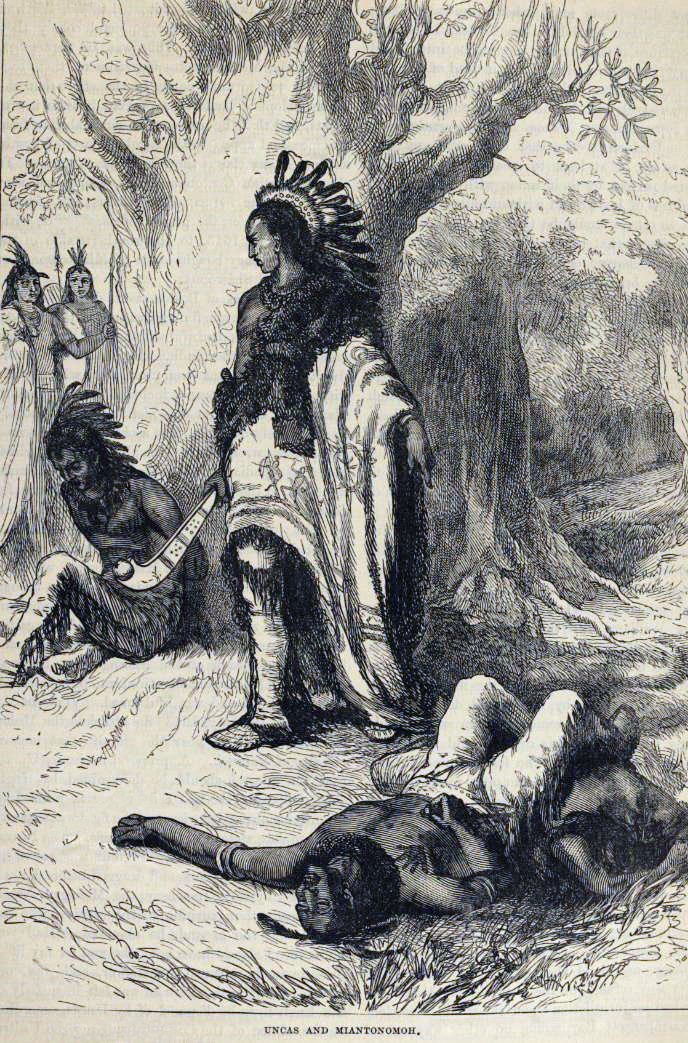
Death of Miantonomoh at the hands of Uncas of the Mohegans

Wyandanch was credited by Lion Gardiner with being the sachem who prevented a rebellion by Miantonomoh (sometimes spelled as Miantonomi) of the Narragansetts. Miantonomoh supported the colonists during the Pequot War and in 1638 a tripartite treaty of peace and friendship was signed between English colonists, the Narragansetts and the Mohegans. However, upset by further expansion of English colonies and the founding of new settlements, in 1640 Miantomoh approached Wyandanch with an offer of a pan-Indian alliance against the colonists and a surprise attack on the newly built colonial villages. Wyandanch however, reminded Miantomoh about the fate of the Pequots and of the Mystic river massacre and in that way managed to dissuade him from attacking the colonists for the time being. In 1643 the Narragansetts went to war against the Mohegans, were defeated, and Miantomoh was captured by Uncas and executed with the approval of the colonists. Because Miantomoh had been trying to agitate other Montaukett chiefs against Wyandanch - to get their support against the Mohegans, which Wyandanch refused - his defeat and death strengthened Wyandanch's position within his own tribe.

== Increasing influence ==
In 1644 Wyandanch was still most likely a minor chief among the Montauketts, His elder brother Poggaticut was grand sachem; as evidenced by an agreement from that year in which the tribe sold 31,000 acres (130 km^{2}) of land near Southampton to English colonists; a number of other sachems' signatures appear before his on the document, indicating their relative importance.

In 1649 and 1650 however, Wyandanch skillfully used his position as an "alliance chief" to increase his own prestige. He defused a tense stand off between the Shinnecock tribe and the colonists, over the killing of a female colonists (which was itself done in retaliation for the murder of a Shinnecock Indian earlier). As a result, he acquired the right to manage and sell Shinnecock land as his own, although he was also made responsible for preventing Shinnecock attacks on the colonists and other tribes.

== Dispute with Ninigret ==
Soon after the sachem of the Niantics, Ninigret, tried to assassinate the chief of the Shinnecocks, Mandush, for his having made an alliance with Wyandanch. However, the would-be assassin was captured before he could carry out his orders and was executed by Wyandanch and Mandush, who then burned his body as an insult to the Niantic leader. Ninigret attempted to get revenge starting in 1652, after the outbreak of the First Anglo-Dutch War. After getting a tacit promise from the English colonial authorities (according to Roger Williams) that they would not intervene in a Niantic-Montaukett war, Ninigret attacked a Montaukett settlement, killed thirty men and carried off fourteen prisoners, among whom were two of the tribes sachems and Wyandanch's own daughter. Soon, however, a peace settlement was reached and the captives released, though the exact terms of the agreement are uncertain. According to Ninigret, Wyandanch swore allegiance to him, agreed to pay tribute and allowed the Niantic chief to sell his land. Wyandanch however claimed that he had simply paid ransom for the captives, through the intermediation of Lion Gardiner. Additionally, Williams gave the credit for the peace to the English in their role as mediators.

Wyandanch broke the agreement in 1654, perhaps in a calculated move to demonstrate his independence, by launching a surprise attack against the Niantics. At the same time, Wyandanch brokered an agreement between members of his tribe and the English colonists on Long Island in relation to cattle grazing rights. As a result, by 1655, he received substantial military support from the colonists in his war against Ninigret. This included a colonial sloop which patrolled Long Island Sound and sank any Niantic canoes that were trying to make their way across.

Ninigret in turn attempted to use colonial institutions to get back at Wyandanch and accused the Montaukett sachem before the English. The three charges were that Wyandanch had broken the peace treaty, that he had personally murdered an Englishman named Drake, and that he had been practicing witchcraft in an attempt to kill the Mohegan chief Uncas (Uncas made a similar charge at about the same time). Wyandanch was exonerated on all three charges because Ninigret's witnesses failed to show up on time, and because the English colonists of Long Island testified on Wyandanch's behalf in the Plymouth court. The trial however did demonstrate the greater use and reliance of the Native American tribes in the area on colonial institutions.

== Later life ==
In the second half of the 1650s, Wyandanch had acquired enough power and influence to be considered the main "alliance chief" on Long Island by the colonists. He acted as an intermediary between English colonists and the Native Americans; he defused a tense situation between the colonists and some Shinnecocks who had been accused of arson. After the Shinnecocks were ordered to pay an outrageous fine for restitution Wyandanch filed an appeal on their behalf which resulted in the fine being somewhat reduced. His other activities involved certifying land sales, making such sales himself and resolving disputes over deeds and payments. Eventually, the English colonists accepted that any such transfer of land had to first be approved by Wyandanch.

In late 1658 Wyandanch let an English colonists, Jeremy Daily, use his canoe (which may have been up to 40 feet (12 m) long) to transport goods across Long Island sound, in exchange for Daily carrying out some repairs on it prior to the shipment. After arriving on Gardiners Island, Daily failed to properly care for the boat and in subsequent bad weather it became damaged. As a result, Wyandanch sued Daily in colonial court, in what was one of the earliest trials with an English defendant and a Native American plaintiff in the history of the English colonies in North America. Wyandanch won his case and Daily had to pay him ten shillings for damages and additional fines for court fees.

== Death ==
In 1659, he deeded a portion of his land to Lion Gardiner which later became the town of Smithtown and also appointed Gardiner the guardian of his young son, Wyancombone until he reached maturity. Gardiner later claimed that Wyandanch was poisoned but he did not state why or by whom.

Wyandanch's wife and son died soon after him, in the plague that struck the Algonquian tribes in southern New England during this time. Wyandanch had a daughter, Quashawam, who became influential regionally.

After Wyandanch's death the office of "chief sachem" and "alliance chief" went into decline and was completely eliminated by the colonists after they managed to conquer New Netherland.

== Legacy ==
Wyandanch, New York is named for him.

== Works cited ==
- Susanah Shaw Romney, New Netherland Connections: Intimate Networks and Atlantic Ties in Seventeenth-Century America, Chapel Hill: University of North Carolina Press, 2014.
- John A. Strong, "Wyandanch: Sachem of the Montauks", in Robert Grumet ed., Northeastern Indian Lives, University of Massachusetts Press, 1996, books.google.com
- Edith Hay Wyckoff, The fabled past: tales of Long Island, Kennikat Press/University of Virginia, 1978.
- Jacqueline Overton, "Indian life on Long Island: family, work, play, legends, heroes", Volume 23 of Empire State historical publications series, I. J. Friedman, 1963.
