= Point Island =

Point Island may refer to:

- Apple Orchard Point Island, Australia
- Double Island Point, Australia
- Gardiners Point Island, New York, USA
- Point Islands, Nunavut
- Rocky Point Island (Queensland), Australia
- West Point Island, Falkland Islands
