= Louise Hortense Snowden =

American academic

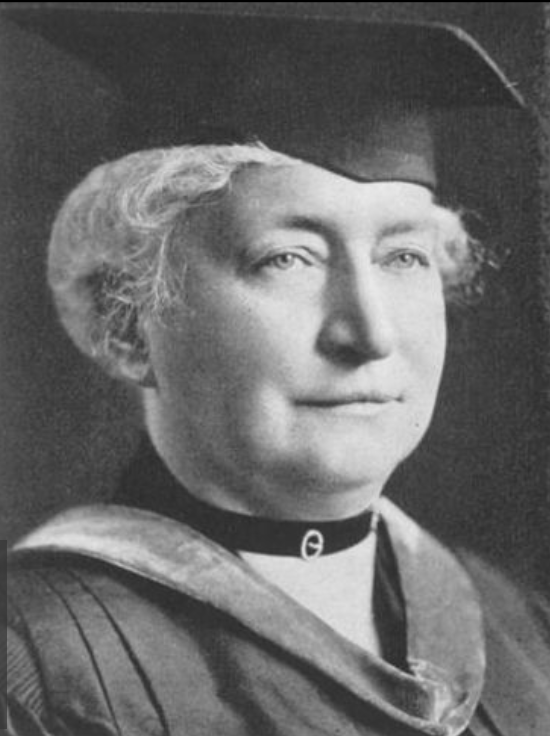
- Louise Hortense Snowden, from a 1924 publication
- Born: July 12, 1864; Philadelphia, Pennsylvania, U.S.
- Died: June 7, 1931 (aged 66); Philadelphia, Pennsylvania, U.S.
- Occupations: Academic dean, war relief worker, medievalist
- Father: James Ross Snowden
- Relatives: A. Loudon Snowden (cousin); Robert Patterson (grandfather)

Louise Hortense Patterson Snowden (July 12, 1864 – June 7, 1931) was an American academic. She was a YMCA worker in France and Belgium during World War I. She was the first Dean of Women at the University of Pennsylvania, an office she held from 1920 to 1925.

== Early life and education ==
Snowden was born in Philadelphia, the daughter of James Ross Snowden and Susan Engle Patterson Snowden. Her father was a lawyer and a politician, and director of the United States Mint; her cousin A. Loudon Snowden was a diplomat. Her maternal grandfather was General Robert Patterson. She graduated from the University of Pennsylvania in 1898; with zoologist Caroline Burling Thompson, she was one of the first two women to earn a bachelor of science degree from that school. She made further studies in history and literature at the Sorbonne in Paris.

== Career ==
Snowden taught medieval history at Wellesley College. She was a YMCA relief worker during World War I, first with the French army, and then with the American forces, managing hospitality sites in France and Belgium. She was elected president of the Women's Overseas Service League in 1923. She became chair of the World War Memorial Grove Committee in 1926, and dedicated a memorial grove of trees in Philadelphia that year. In 1930, the French government presented her with the Medaille de la Reconnaissance Francaise for her wartime contributions.

Snowden was the first Dean of Women at the University of Pennsylvania, beginning in 1920. In 1922 she spoke on "The Place and Function of Cultural Studies in America" at a meeting of the Philadelphia Society for the Promotion of Liberal Studies. She resigned from the office in 1925. In 1929, she was in the first class of inductees into the university's Women's Hall of Fame, along with Margaret Center Klingelsmith, Gertrude Klein Pierce Easby, Anna Lockhart Flanigen, and Ida Wood.

== Personal life and legacy ==
Snowden died from breast cancer in 1931, at the age of 66, at a hospital in Philadelphia. The Cincinnati Museum of Art has a 1925 portrait miniature of Snowden, painted by Anna Margaretta Archambault.
