= Loudon Wainwright =

Loudon Wainwright may refer to:

- Loudon Wainwright Jr. (Loudon Snowden Wainwright, 1924–1988), American writer, notably for Life magazine
- Loudon Wainwright III (Loudon Snowden Wainwright, born 1946), American songwriter and folk musician, son of Loudon Wainwright Jr.
  - Loudon Wainwright III (album), also known as Album I, 1970
