= Fort Tyler =

Coordinates: 41°8′29″N 72°8′46″W

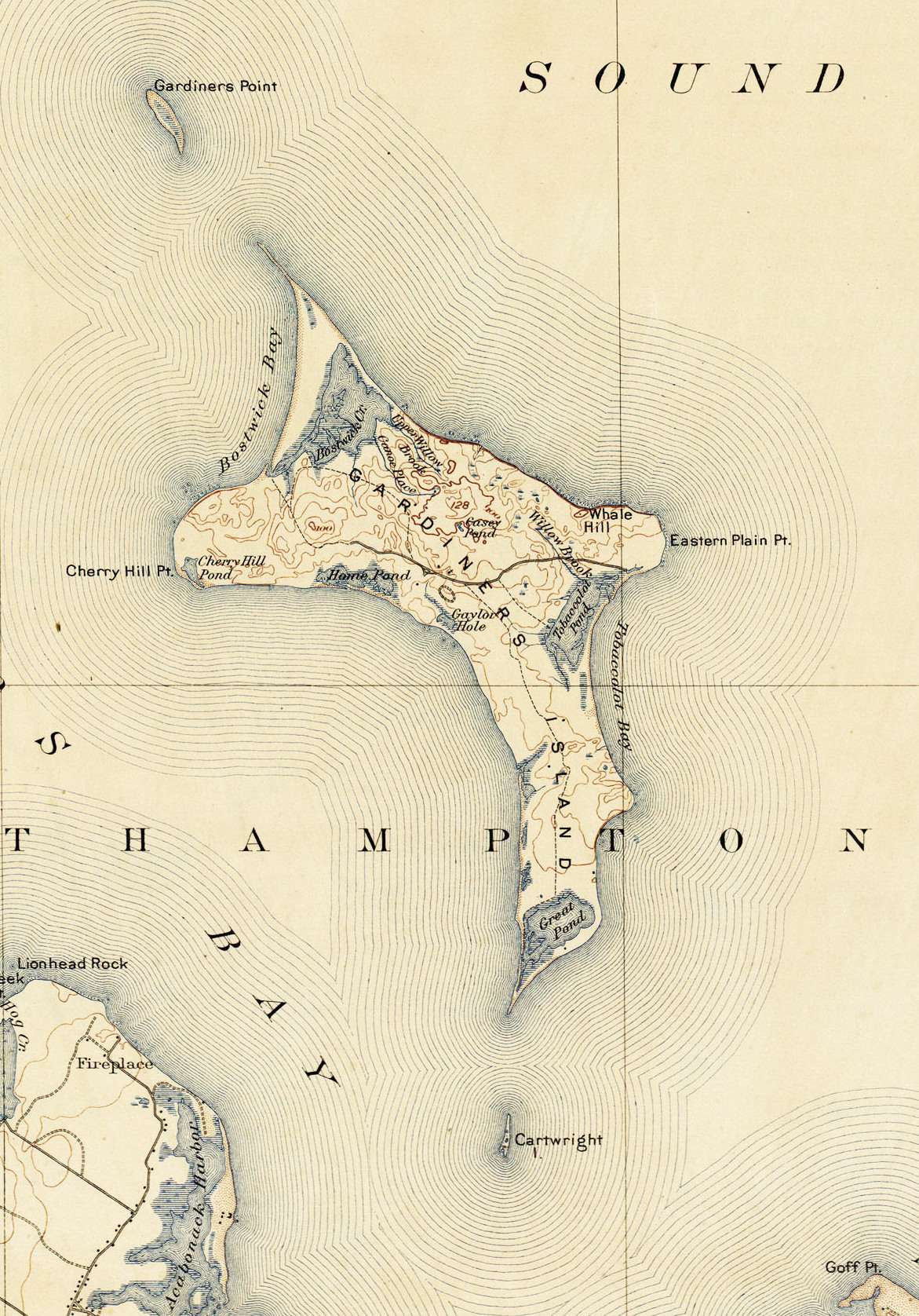
Fort Tyler is located on Gardiners Point Island, a small island just north of the northernmost point on Gardiners Island

Fort Tyler was a coastal fortification on Gardiners Point Island, a small island off Gardiners Island, in Gardiners Bay, at the eastern tip of Long Island, New York.

The fort was constructed in 1898, during the Spanish American War, to protect Long Island from the danger of bombardment from Spanish Naval vessels. The fort was equipped with two 8-inch (203mm) rifles and two 5-inch (127mm) rifles. The fort was abandoned in 1920 and President Franklin Roosevelt made it a bird reserve in 1938. During World War II, United States Naval forces used the fort as a target.

The fort may contain unexploded ordnance, so landing is prohibited.
