= James Ross Snowden =

American politician (1809–1878)

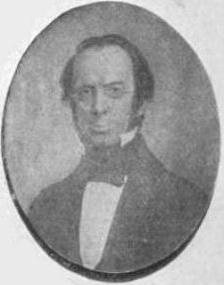
- Portrait of James Ross Snowden

Pennsylvania House of Representatives, Clarion and Venango Counties, Pennsylvania
- In office 1838–1843

67th Speaker of the Pennsylvania House of Representatives
- In office 1842–1842
- Preceded by: William A. Crabb
- Succeeded by: Hendrick Bradley Wright

Pennsylvania House of Representatives, Clarion, Jefferson and Venango Counties, Pennsylvania
- In office 1844–1844

67th Speaker of the Pennsylvania House of Representatives
- In office 1844–1844
- Preceded by: Hendrick Bradley Wright
- Succeeded by: Findlay Patterson

17th Treasurer of Pennsylvania
- In office 1845–1847
- Preceded by: Job Mann
- Succeeded by: Arnold Plumber

Director of the United States Mint
- In office June 1853 – May 1861
- Preceded by: Thomas M. Pettit
- Succeeded by: James Pollock

Personal details
- Born: December 9, 1809 Chester, Pennsylvania, U.S.
- Died: March 21, 1878 (aged 68) Hulmeville, Pennsylvania, U.S.
- Resting place: Laurel Hill Cemetery, Philadelphia, Pennsylvania, U.S.

James Ross Snowden (December 9, 1809 – March 21, 1878 ) was an American politician from Pennsylvania who served as a Democratic member of the Pennsylvania House of Representatives representing Venango and Clarion counties from 1838 to 1843 and Venango, Jefferson and Clarion counties in 1844. He served as Speaker of the Pennsylvania House of Representatives in 1842 and again in 1844. He served as the Treasurer of Pennsylvania from 1845 to 1847, as treasurer of the United States Mint from 1847 to 1850 and as director of the United States Mint from 1853 to 1861.

== Early life and education ==
Snowden was born December 9, 1809, in Chester, Pennsylvania, to the Rev. Nathaniel Randolph Snowden and Sarah (Gustine). He was educated at Dickinson College, received a Master of Arts degree from Jefferson College in 1845 and an honorary doctor of law degree from Washington and Jefferson College in 1875. He studied law, settled in Franklin, Pennsylvania, and joined the Venango County Bar in 1828.

== Career ==
He was made deputy attorney general and was elected to the Pennsylvania House of Representatives for Venango and Clarion counties from 1838 to 1843 and for Venango, Jefferson and Clarion counties in 1844. He served as speaker of the Pennsylvania House of Representatives from 1842 and again in 1844. As speaker, he signed legislation regarding state debt, regulation of insurance companies, setting election districts and establishing funding for the education of the poor. He was state treasurer from 1845 until 1847, and was also elected colonel in the state militia.

Snowden developed an interest in numismatics during his work at the United States Mint, and became a noted numismatist of his day. He contributed to such publications as Bouvier's Law Dictionary, as well as publishing several numismatic books of his own. During his tenure as Mint director, he was noted for producing restrikes of older United States coins including the 1840s-1850s half cents, 1827 quarter, 1856 Flying Eagle cent and Gobrecht dollars of 1836–39, which he sold to collectors to finance the Mint's collection. He also oversaw the reconstruction of the Mint building and added fireproofing.

In 1850, he returned to the practice of law in Pittsburgh, Pennsylvania and worked as a solicitor for the Pennsylvania Railroad Company.

In 1861, he became prothonotary of the Supreme Court of Pennsylvania.

During the American Civil War, Snowden served as lieutenant colonel for the Philadelphia First Regiment of Home Guards but never saw active duty.

He died on March 21, 1878, in Hulmeville, Pennsylvania and was interred at Laurel Hill Cemetery in Philadelphia, Pennsylvania.

== Family ==
He married Susan Engle Patterson in 1848 and together they had five children. Their daughter Louise Hortense Snowden became the first Dean of Women at the University of Pennsylvania. His great-grandfather, Nathanael Fitz Randolph, served in the American Revolutionary War, known as "Fighting Nat," and was presented with a sword by the legislature of New Jersey. He also started the first subscription paper for Princeton College, and gave the ground upon which Nassau Hall, the first edifice of that college, was built. His father was curator of Dickinson College from 1794 until 1827. His nephew A. Loudon Snowden became superintendent of the Philadelphia office of the United States Mint.

== Published works ==
- A Measure Proposed to Secure to the People a Safe Treasury and a Sound Currency, Benjamin F. Mifflin, Philadelphia, 1857
- A Description of Ancient and Modern Coins in the Cabinet Collection at the Mint of the United States, J.B. Lippincott & Co., Philadelphia, 1860
- A Description of the Medals of Washington; of National and Miscellaneous Medals; and of Other Objects of Interest in the Museum of the Mint., J.B. Lippincott & Co., Philadelphia, 1861
- The Mint at Philadelphia (1861)
- The Coins of the Bible, and its Money Terms., Presbyterian Board of Publication, Philadelphia, 1864
- The Cornplanter Memorial. An Historical Sketch of Gy-ant-wa-chia - the Cornplanter, and of the Six Nations of Indians., Singerly & Myers, Harrisburg, 1867

He contributed articles on the coin of the United States to the National Almanac of 1873.

Pennsylvania House of Representatives
| Preceded by | Member of the Pennsylvania House of Representatives, Delaware County and Venango County; 1838–1843 | Succeeded by |
| Preceded by William A. Crabb | 67th Speaker of the Pennsylvania House of Representatives; 1842–1842 | Succeeded by Hendrick Bradley Wright |
| Preceded by | Member of the Pennsylvania House of Representatives, Delaware County, Jefferson County and Venango County; 1844–1844 | Succeeded by |
| Preceded by Hendrick Bradley Wright | 67th Speaker of the Pennsylvania House of Representatives; 1844–1844 | Succeeded by Findlay Patterson |
Political offices
| Preceded by Job Mann | Treasurer of Pennsylvania; 1845–1847 | Succeeded by Arnold Plumber |
Government offices
| Preceded by Thomas M. Pettit | Director of the United States Mint; June 1853 – May 1861 | Succeeded by James Pollock |
