= Hicks Island (New York) =

Island in Suffolk County, New York, United States

Coordinates: 41°00′57″N 72°03′39″W

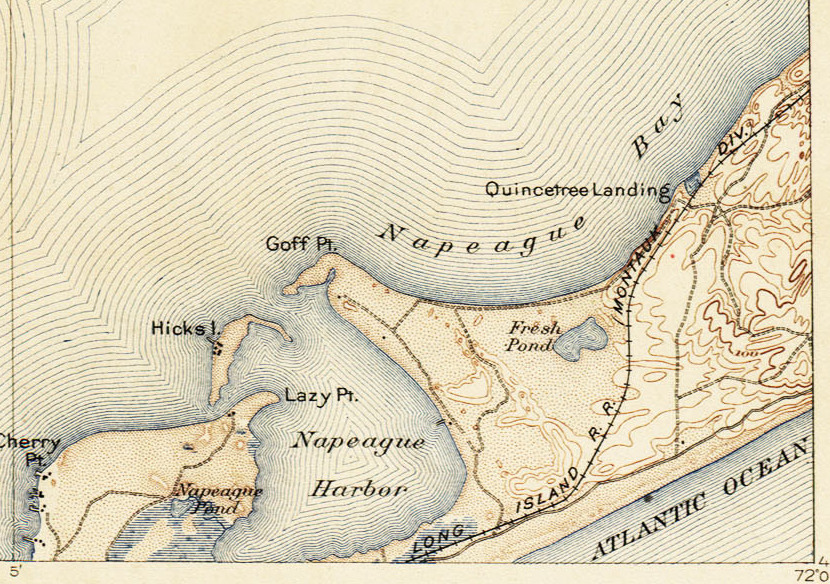
Hicks Island, Napeague Harbor, Napeague Bay, on the south-east tip of Long Island.

Hicks Island is an island in Napeague Bay, Suffolk County, New York, in the United States. The small island is located north of Napeague on the eastern end of Long Island.

Hicks Island was named for an early owner. It has also been known as Goffe Island.

In September 1971 Otis G. Pike put forward a bill that the US Federal government expropriate Hicks Island, historic Gardiners Island, Cartwright Island, Gardiners Point Island and 1000 acres of the nearby shore of Long Island, and turn them into a national monument.
