= Carroll Livingston Wainwright =

American artist and socialite (1899–1967)

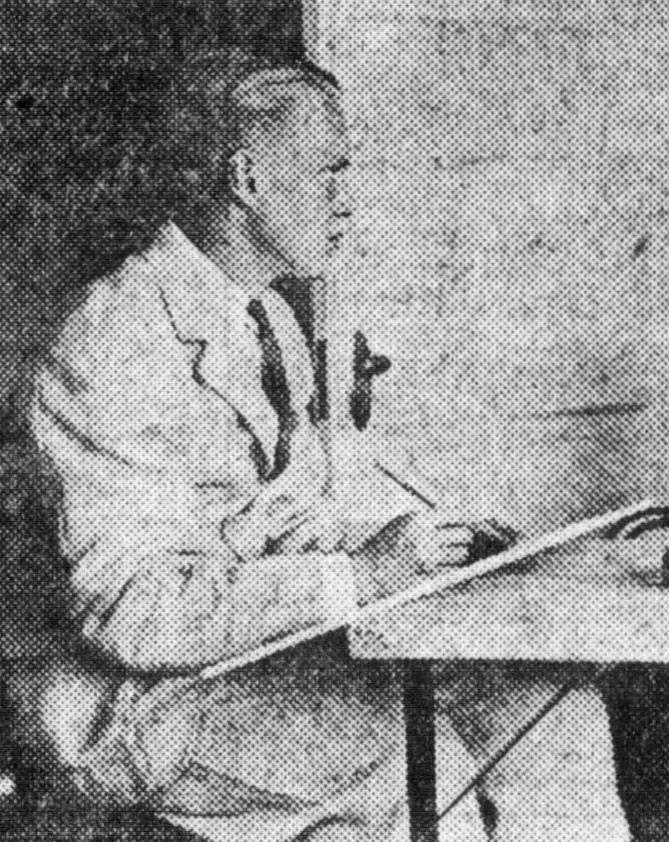
- Wainwright in 1923
- Born: December 2, 1899; Philadelphia, Pennsylvania, US
- Died: July 6, 1967 (aged 67); East Hampton, New York, US
- Education: Pawling School
- Spouse: Edith Catherine Gould (m. 1920; div. 1932)
- Children: Stuyvesant Wainwright II; Caroline DePeyster Wainwright; Carroll L. Wainwright Jr.
- Parent(s): Stuyvesant Wainwright; Caroline Smith Snowden
- Relatives: Jonathan M. Wainwright (uncle); Loudon Wainwright Jr. (nephew); A. Loudon Snowden (grandfather)

Carroll Livingston Wainwright (December 2, 1899 – July 6, 1967) was an American artist and socialite.

== Early life ==
Wainwright was born on December 2, 1899, in Philadelphia, Pennsylvania, to Stuyvesant Wainwright (1863–1930) and Caroline Smith Snowden (1865–1960). His siblings included Stuyvesant Wainwright (1891–1975) J. Howard Wainwright, and Loudon Snowden Wainwright (1898–1942). After his parents' divorce, his mother remarried to Dr. Carl F. Wolff (1864–1934), and his father remarried to Sarah Hughes.

Wainwright was a nephew of General Jonathan Mayhew Wainwright (1883–1953), a four star-general who was the hero of Bataan and commander of the U.S. forces in the Philippines during World War II. Through his brother, Loudon, he was the uncle of Loudon Wainwright Jr., and the grand-uncle of Loudon Wainwright III, the singer and songwriter, himself the father of Rufus Wainwright, Martha Wainwright, and Lucy Wainwright Roche.

Wainwright's paternal grandparents were Margaret (née Livingston) Wainwright and John Howard Wainwright, who was the son of the Bishop of New York, Jonathan Mayhew Wainwright. His maternal grandparents were Elizabeth Robinson Smith and Archibald Loudon Snowden, who served as U.S. Ambassador to Spain, Serbia, Romania and Greece. He was a direct descendant of Peter Stuyvesant, the last Dutch governor of New York.

== Career ==
After his marriage in 1920, Wainwright became a Wall Street broker. In 1923, he left Wall Street and became a painter, continuing nearly the rest of his life. He focused his art on painting miniatures. In 1927, the family moved to East Hampton, New York, where they built an imposing house called "Gulf Crest," that was valued at $350,000 in 1937.

=== Military service ===
During World War I, Wainwright left the Pawling School, and enlisted in the U.S. Naval Reserve, where he served patrol boat duty. In 1942, Wainwright again enlisted, serving on an anti-submarine patrol sailing ship out of Greenport.

== Personal life ==
On May 27, 1920, Wainwright eloped and married 18-year-old Edith Catherine Gould (1900–1937). She was the daughter of millionaire George Jay Gould I (1864-1923) and Edith M. Kingdon (1864-1921). Before their divorce in 1932, they became the parents of:

- Stuyvesant Wainwright II (1921–2010), who represented New York's 1st District in the U.S. House of Representatives from 1953 to 1961.
- Caroline DePeyster Wainwright (1924–1969), who married Edward T. Shean, an investment banker, in 1945. They divorced in 1963.
- Carroll Livingston Wainwright Jr. (1925–2016), who married Nina Walker in 1948.

In February 1931, Wainwright was committed to the Bloomingdale Hospital at White Plains by his brothers. In their suit, they claimed he had been subject to hallucinations since 1916, when he had pneumonia and an appendicitis operation. They claimed he had suffered breakdowns in 1916, 1923, and 1929, because of overwork and the strenuous demands of society. Three months later, he was released.

After their divorce in January 1932, Wainwright's ex-wife immediately married Sir Hector MacNeal, the Scottish shipowner. There was no property settlement. Wainwright died on July 6, 1967, aged 67, in East Hampton.
