= Caroline Burling Thompson =

American entomologist

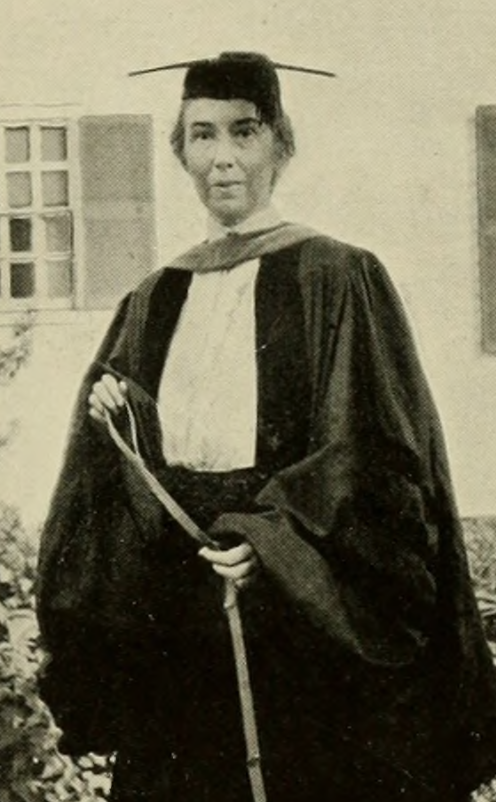
- Caroline Burling Thompson, from the 1922 yearbook of Wellesley College
- Born: July 27, 1869; Germantown, Pennsylvania, U.S.
- Died: December 5, 1921 (aged 52); Boston, Massachusetts, U.S.
- Occupations: Entomologist, college professor

Caroline Burling Thompson (July 27, 1869 – December 5, 1921) was an American entomologist and a professor of zoology at Wellesley College. She studied the brains of ants and termites, and was the first woman scientist to publish a study of ribbon worms.

== Early life and education ==
Thompson was born in Germantown, Pennsylvania on July 27, 1869, the daughter of Lucius Peters Thompson and Caroline Jones Burling Thompson. She attended the Drexel Institute, and graduated from the University of Pennsylvania in 1898, one of the first two women to earn a Bachelor of Science degree from Penn (the other was her classmate, Louise Hortense Snowden). She completed a Ph.D. at Penn in 1901; her doctoral advisor was Edwin Conklin.

== Career ==
Thompson taught zoology at Wellesley College beginning in 1901; she became a full professor in 1916. She was the first woman to publish research on nemerteans, or ribbon worms. She was a delegate to an international zoological congress in Graz in 1910. She worked with the USDA's Bureau of Entomology from 1917.

== Publications ==
Thompson's articles appeared in scholarly journals including Science, Journal of Comparative Neurology, Journal of Morphology, and The Biological Bulletin.

- Preliminary Description of Zygeupolia Littoralis: A New Genus and New Species of Heteronemertean (1900)
- Zygeupolia Litoralis, a New Heteronemertean (1901)
- The Commissures and the Neurocord Cells of the Brain of Cerebratulus Lacteus (1908)
- "The Wellesley College Fire" (1914)
- "The brain and the frontal gland of the castes of the 'White Ant,'leucotermes flavipes, kollar" (1916)
- "Origin of the Castes of the Common Termite, Leucotermes flavipes Kol" (1917)
- "The development of the castes of nine genera and thirteen species of termites" (1919)
- "The Question of the Phylogenetic Origin of Termite Castes" (1919, with Thomas Elliott Snyder)
- "The ‘third form,’the wingless reproductive type of termites: Reticulitermes and Prorhinotermes" (1920, with Thomas Elliott Snyder)
- "The castes of Termopsis" (1922, published posthumously)

== Personal life ==
Thompson died after a surgery in 1921, at a hospital in Boston, at the age of 52.
