= Cartwright Island =

Island in New York, United States

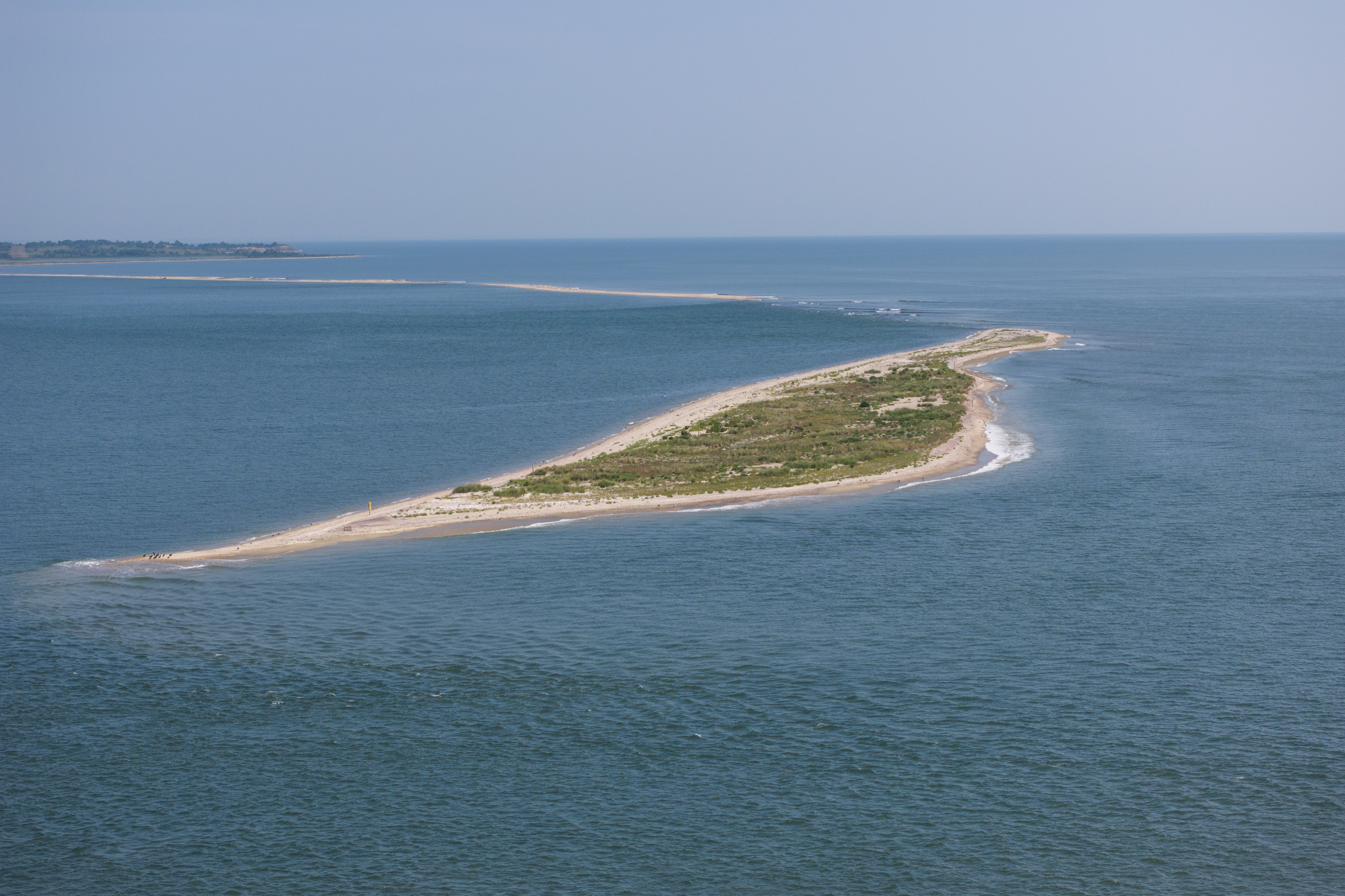
- Aerial view of Cartwright Island in 2025

Geography
- Location: Gardiners Bay
- Coordinates: 41°01′30″N 72°06′20″W
- Length: 1 mi (2 km)

Administration
- United States
- State: New York
- County: Suffolk

Cartwright Island (also known as Cartwright Shoal) exists as a long, narrow, segmented sandbar, separated from the south end of historic Gardiner's Island, off the coast of Long Island, New York. An analysis of satellite and aerial photos shows that over time, the segmented sandbar islands continuously move location, sink and reform, shaped and overwashed by tides and storms. The location and shape of any sandbar island on the shoal may differ from that shown on navigational charts. For this reason, the shoal presents a navigational hazard.

Ownership of Cartwright Island and the shoal is disputed. The Goelet family, the current owners of Gardiner's Island, have claimed ownership of Cartwright since the death of the last surviving Gardiner (Robert David Lion Gardiner) in 2004. However, in his lifetime, Mr. Gardiner never made such claim, and to the contrary, stated that the shoal was public property. In 2018 Roderic Richardson challenged the Goelet's assertion of ownership after their security guards confronted Richardson, and members of his family, on Cartwright Island.

The Goelets assert their original 17th Century deed grants them everywhere "an Ox can wade without getting its belly wet." Mr. Richardson said there was no mention of any ox in the royal grants, nor of Cartwright Island or the shoal. He also pointed out that a shoal is, by definition, intertidal or underwater land, and so open to public access by New York law and the Public Trust Doctrine. The Goelets accused Richardson of trespass. Judge Steven Tekulsky dismissed the case in April 2020, noting that the charging documents failed to establish that anyone owned Cartwright Shoal, and failed to show that anyone had any authority to prevent Mr. Richardson from walking on the sandbar.

In September 1971 Otis G. Pike put forward a bill that the US Federal government expropriate Gardiners Island, Cartwright Island, Gardiners Point Island, Hicks Island, and 1000 acres of the nearby shore of Long Island, and turn them into a national monument.

In September 1973 David P. Rumbough disappeared during a boating accident off Cartwright Island. His friend Jonathan Kieth survived the crash of his 27 foot speedboat. Rumbough was the son of actress Dina Merrill.
