= The View from Here (column) =

The View From Here was a column by Loudon Wainwright Jr. that appeared in Life magazine for many years. Wainwright wrote the column for 24 years until his death in 1988 at the age of 63. The column has been described as "always a pleasing paradox, a self-revealing and even confessional voice, thoughtful, concerned and unpretentious, amid the collective grandeurs of photo-journalism."

Loudon Wainwright III, one of Loudon Wainwright Jr.'s children, has read passages from the column in his live performances, juxtaposing them with various songs he has written.

Google recently made many years of Life magazine available through Google Books. The tables below link to many of the columns throughout the years at Google books.

== 1964 ==
| Date | Title | Description |
|---|---|---|
| 3/13/1964 | "The Strange Case of Strangelove" | Review of the film Dr. Strangelove |
| 4/24/1964 | “Ramble in the Past with Mr. Truman” | (summary) |
| 7/3/1964 | “A Very Special Murderer” | (summary) |
| 7/17/1964 | "A big week with a Watusi" | Reflection on hosting an exchange student from Uganda |
| 8/7/1964 | "The Right Kind of Uncle Tom" | Discussion of the meaning of the label "Uncle Tom" in the aftermath of the Harlem riot of 1964 |
| 8/21/1964 | "Uneasy Conscience at a County Fair" | Reflection on the murders of Chaney, Goodman, and Schwerner in Philadelphia, Mississippi |
| 9/18/1964 | “Last Search for Summer” | (summary) |
| 10/30/1964 | “What road back from ruin?” | (summary) |

== 1965 ==
| Date | Title | Description |
|---|---|---|
| 1/22/1965 | “A confession on the presidency” | (summary) |
| 1/29/1965 | “Report from the underground” | (summary) |
| 4/30/1965 | “False faces for the real me” | (summary) |
| 5/14/1965 | "Aboard a carrier off Vietnam" | (summary) |
| 5/28/1965 | “In search of a Vietnam hero” | (summary) |
| 7/23/1965 | "Invitation to a hard time ahead" | (summary) |
| 8/6/1965 | “Our encounter with Mars” | (summary) |
| 9/17/1965 | "Hot pursuit of turnpike flyers" | (summary) |
| 10/15/1965 | "A humble man, our brother" | (summary) |
| 10/29/1965 | "The suicide that lives in all of us" | (summary) |
| 11/19/1965 | “A dark night to remember” | (summary) |

== 1966 ==
| Date | Title | Description |
|---|---|---|
| 3/4/1966 | "A serious to-do about a silly law" | (summary) |
| 4/8/1966 | "A breakthrough in R.S.V.P.ism" | (summary) |
| 4/22/1966 | “Dissent to the High Court’s harsh verdict” | (summary) |
| 7/15/1966 | “High hopes for a new house” | (summary) |
| 8/12/1966 | “Waves of summers past and present” | (summary) |
| 9/23/1966 | “Challenge to unconcerned bystanders” | (summary) |

== 1967 ==
| Date | Title | Description |
|---|---|---|
| 3/10/1967 | “The mass sport of Wyeth-watching” | (summary) |
| 8/4/1967 | "A tough time to be a good cop" | (summary) |
| 10/20/1967 | “Britain survives the Breathalyser” | (summary) |

== 1968 ==
| Date | Title | Description |
|---|---|---|
| 3/8/1968 | "A Bad Bet at Bacchanalia" | (summary) |

== 1969 ==
| Date | Title | Description |
|---|---|---|
| 1/17/1969 | "Messages from the head and heart" | (summary) |

== 1972 ==
| Date | Title | Description |
|---|---|---|
| 1/14/1972 | “My ‘most admired’ Man” (Paddy McCarthy) | (summary) |
| 3/31/1972 | “Out of the past, a need for hope | (summary) |
| 2/18/1972 | “The sum of recollection just keeps growing” | (summary) |
