= A. Loudon Snowden =

American diplomat (1835–1912)

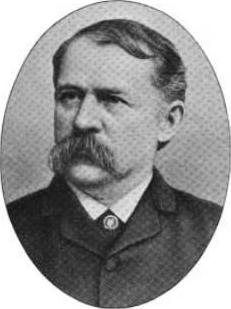

29th United States Minister to Spain
- In office July 22, 1892 – June 3, 1893
- President: Benjamin Harrison; Grover Cleveland
- Preceded by: Edward Burd Grubb Jr.
- Succeeded by: Hannis Taylor

U.S. Ambassador to Serbia, Romania and Greece
- In office July 1, 1889 – August 25, 1892
- President: Benjamin Harrison
- Preceded by: Walker Fearn
- Succeeded by: Truxtun Beale

Personal details
- Born: Archibald Loudon Snowden; August 11, 1835 Cumberland County, Pennsylvania, U.S.
- Died: September 7, 1912 (aged 77) Philadelphia, Pennsylvania, U.S.
- Resting place: Laurel Hill Cemetery, Philadelphia, Pennsylvania, U.S.
- Party: Republican
- Spouse: Elizabeth Robinson Smith (m. 1864; died 1910)
- Children: 4
- Relatives: James Ross Snowden (uncle); Carroll Livingston Wainwright (grandson); Stuyvesant Wainwright II (great-grandson); Loudon Wainwright Jr. (great-grandson); Loudon Wainwright III(great-great-grandson)
- Education: Jefferson College
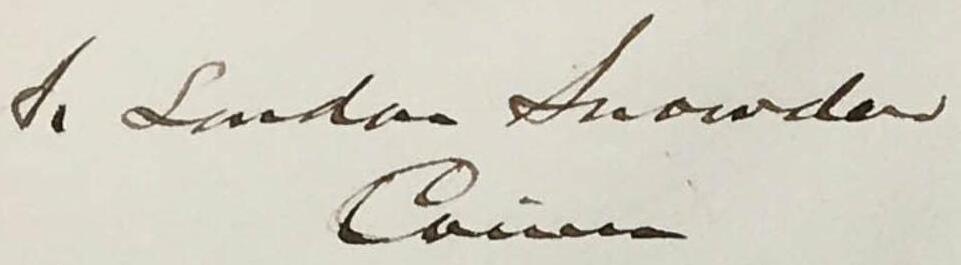
- Signature

Archibald Loudon Snowden (August 11, 1835 – September 7, 1912) was an American diplomat. He served simultaneously as the United States Minister to Greece, Romania, and Serbia from 1889 to 1892 and as the United States Minister to Spain from 1892 to 1893. During the American Civil War, he raised a regiment of infantry and served as lieutenant-colonel during their training. He subsequently served as captain in the First City Troop. He held multiple roles at the Philadelphia Mint, including as chief coiner from 1877 to 1879 and as superintendent and Chief Executor from 1879 to 1885.

== Early life and education ==
Snowden was born in Cumberland County, Pennsylvania, on August 11, 1835. He was a son of Margery Bines (née Louden) and Isaac Wayne Snowden. His uncle, James Ross Snowden, was a politician and director of the United States Mint. His father was a surgeon in the U.S. Army and served in the First Seminole War under General Jackson and was wounded at Fort Scott.

Snowden graduated from Jefferson College in 1856. He studied law after graduation but never entered the bar.

== Career ==
He was made register of the United States Mint 7 May 1857. Politically, Snowden was a Democrat until 1860 when he switched to the Republican party believing that the Democrats' policies were detrimental to the manufacturing interests of the country.

After the American Civil War broke out in 1861, Snowden assisted in raising a regiment of Pennsylvania volunteer infantry and was commissioned Lieutenant colonel. When the regiment was entered into the United States Army, they were divided amongst several Pennsylvania regiments. Snowden was not voted as one of their officers and he returned to his position at the Mint. He was subsequently elected captain of the First City Troop of Philadelphia.

He was elected as a member of the American Philosophical Society in 1873.

=== Post-war career ===
Snowden became chief coiner at the Philadelphia Mint on 1 October 1866. In 1873, he was elected vice president of the Fire Association, an insurance company, and became president in 1878. From 1877 to 1879, he served as postmaster of Philadelphia, Snowden served as the superintendent of the Philadelphia Mint from 1879 to 1885. appointed by President Ulysses S. Grant. In 1878, he twice declined to serve as director of United States Mint, offered by President Hayes. In 1879, he became the Chief Executor in the Philadelphia Mint and served in that role until Grover Cleveland's election in 1885. In 1887, he served as the Marshal of the Centennial celebration of the United States Constitution, which was held in Philadelphia.

He made improvements and inventions relating to coining machinery, and wrote articles on subjects relating to coinage, the great seal of the United States, and other subjects. He was identified with railroads, insurance companies, and other business interests.

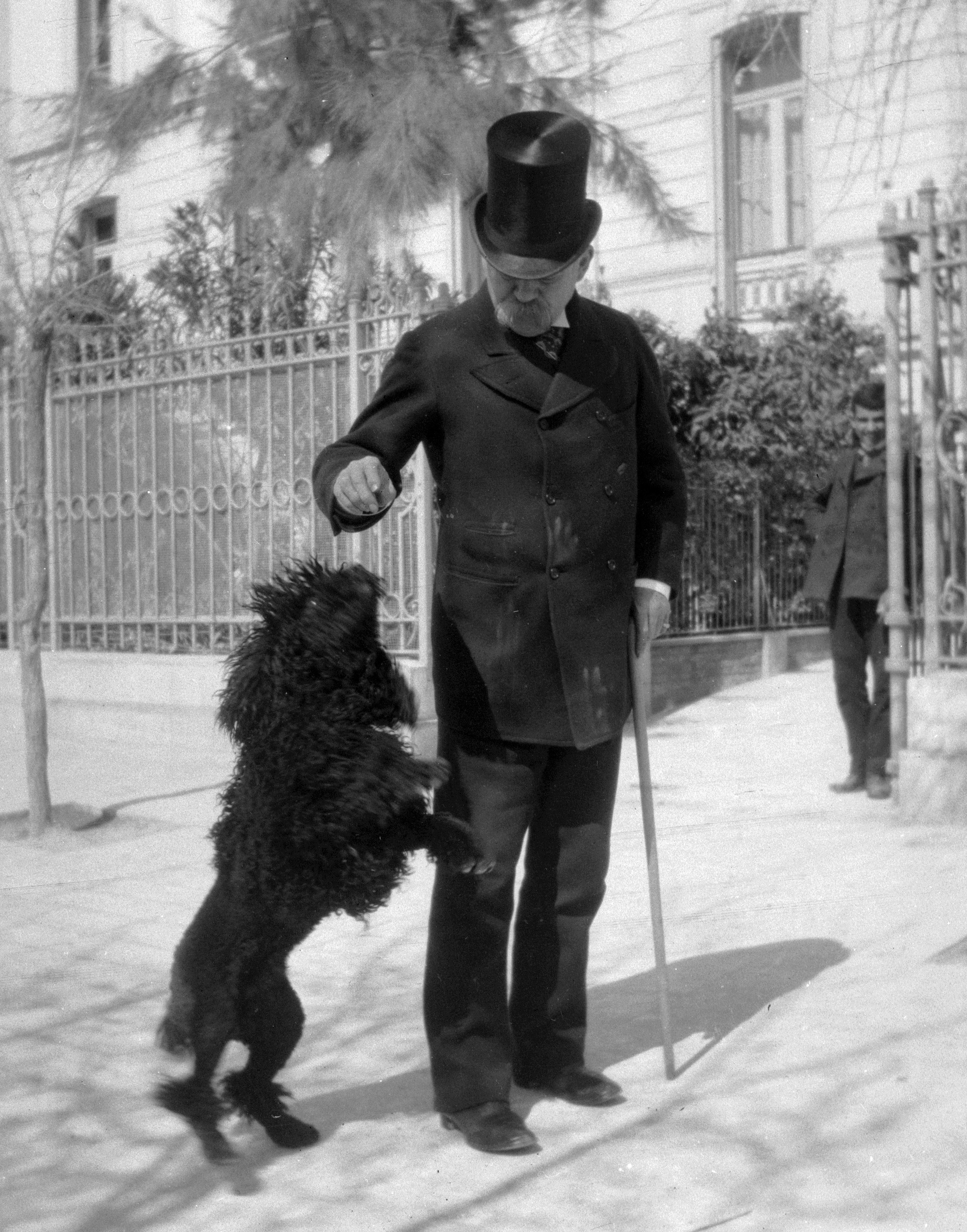
Snowden and his dog Nibbings in Athens, 1891

=== Diplomatic career ===
In 1889, Snowden succeeded Walker Fearn and served simultaneously as the United States Minister to Greece, Romania, and Serbia from 1889 to 1892. From 1892 to 1893, he served as the United States Minister to Spain, succeeding Edward Burd Grubb Jr.

=== Later career ===
Snowden was the president of the Fairmount Park Commission. In 1903, he was accused, along with Charles A. Porter, former State Senator, C. Kennedy Crossan, a contractor and Ludwig S. Filbert, of making illegal profits through the Danville Bessemer Company.

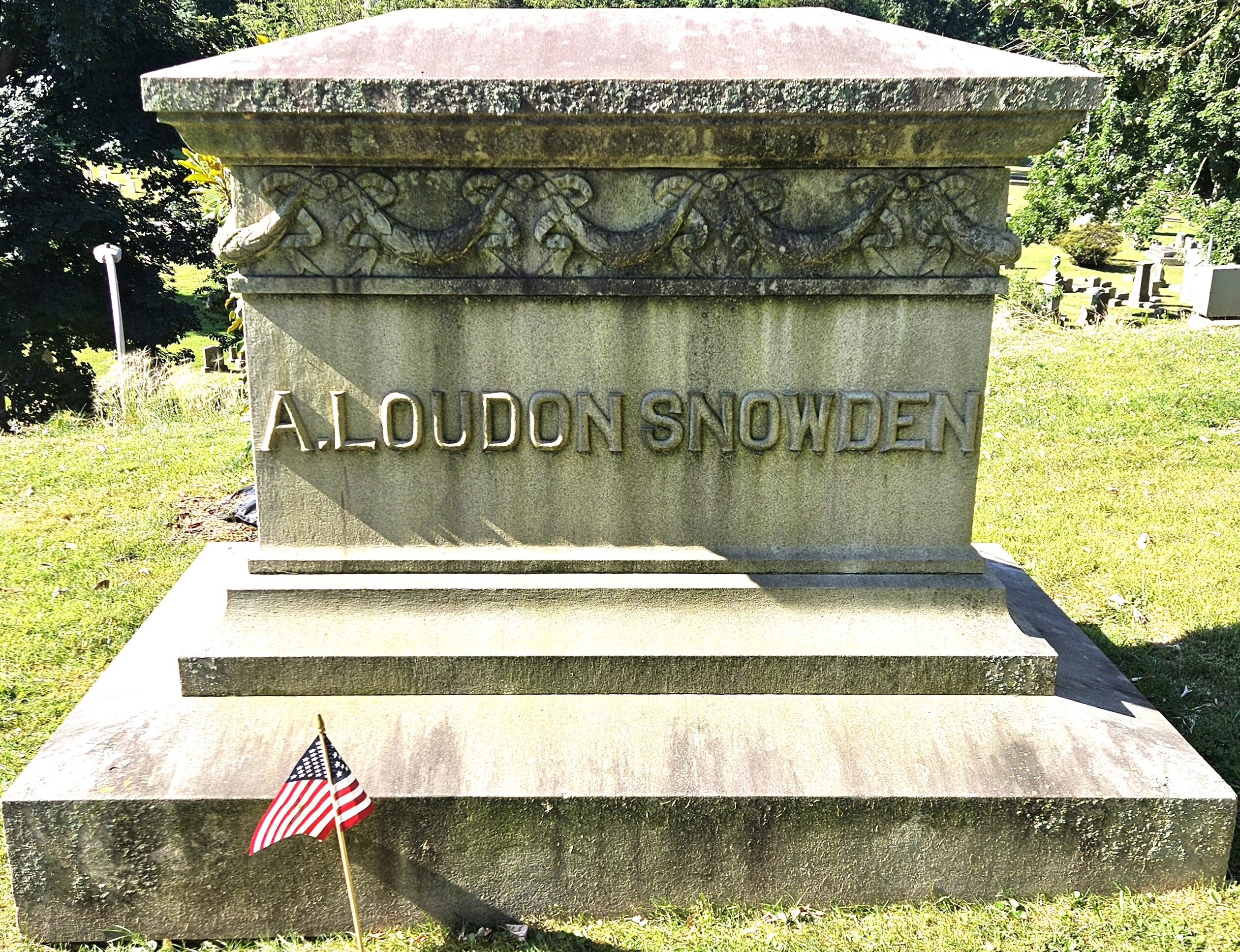
A. Loudon Snowden Grave in Laurel Hill Cemetery

Snowden died on September 7, 1912, in Philadelphia, Pennsylvania, after battling a nine-month illness.

== Family ==
On February 16, 1864, Snowden was married to Elizabeth Robinson Smith (1841–1910). Together, they were the parents of:

- Caroline Smith Snowden (1865–1960), who married Stuyvesant Wainwright (1863–1930) in 1889. They divorced and she married Dr. Carl F. Wolff (1864–1934).
- Mary Buchanan Snowden (b. 1866), who married Frank Samuel in 1887.
- Charles Randolph Snowden (1871–1913), who married Berthe de Pourtales Churchman (1878–1958) in 1899.
- Archibald Loudon Snowden (1878–1878), who died young.

=== Descendants ===
He was the grandfather of Stuyvesant Wainwright (1891–1975), Snowden Wainwright (b. 1893), Loudon Snowden Wainwright (1898–1942), and Carroll Livingston Wainwright (1899–1967), and great-grandfather of Stuyvesant Wainwright II (1921–2010) and Loudon Wainwright Jr. (1924–1988).
