= Otis G. Pike =

Democratic member of the United States House of Representatives (1921–2014)

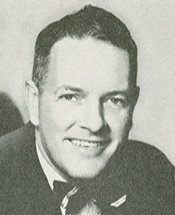

Member of the U.S. House of Representatives from New York's 1st district
- In office January 3, 1961 – January 3, 1979
- Preceded by: Stuyvesant Wainwright
- Succeeded by: William Carney

Personal details
- Born: August 31, 1921 Riverhead, New York, U.S.
- Died: January 20, 2014 (aged 92) Vero Beach, Florida, U.S.
- Party: Democratic
- Spouse(s): Doris O. Pike; Barbe Bonjour
- Children: 3
- Education: Princeton University (AB); Columbia Law School (JD)

Otis Grey Pike (August 31, 1921 – January 20, 2014) was an American lawyer and politician who served nine terms as a Democratic member of the United States House of Representatives from New York, from 1961 to 1979.

== Early life ==
Pike was born in Riverhead, New York. He served in the United States Marine Corps in the Pacific as a dive bomber and night fighter pilot from 1942 until 1946. He graduated with an AB from the School of Public and International Affairs at Princeton University in 1943 after completing a senior thesis titled "American-Chinese Relations: Emphasizing the Years 1931-1941." He then received a Juris Doctor from Columbia Law School in 1948.

== Public office ==
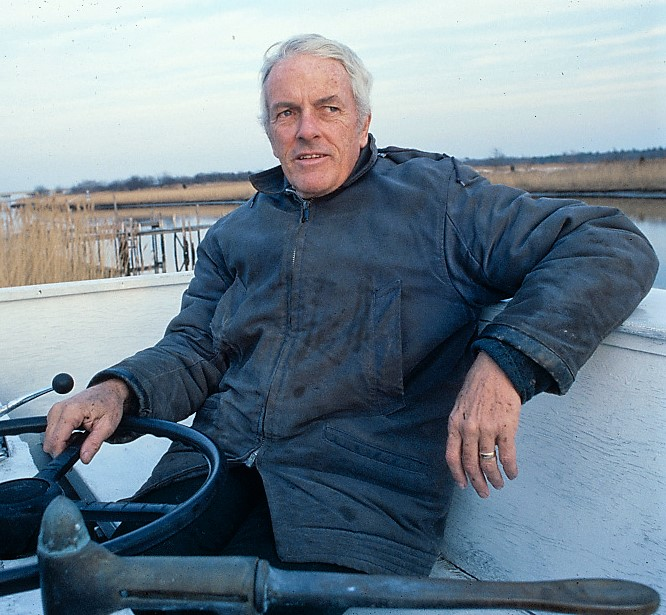
Pike boating in 1978

Pike was first elected to public office in the Town of Riverhead as a Justice of the Peace.

=== Tenure in Congress ===
Pike ran for Congress in New York's 1st congressional district in 1958, an election which he lost to incumbent Stuyvesant Wainwright. Two years later, in 1960, he ran again and this time narrowly defeated Wainwright. Pike represented the 1st district from January 3, 1961, until January 3, 1979.

Pike was a member of the House Armed Services Committee and in the mid-1970s headed the Congressional Special Select Committee on Intelligence, the House version of the Senate Committee on Intelligence headed by Senator Frank Church. The House of Representatives voted 246–124 to direct that the Pike report not be released if not certified by the President not to contain classified information. However, extracts of the report were published by The Village Voice, and later in full by Spokesman Books of Nottingham, England. In his final years in Congress, Pike served on the Ways and Means Committee.

During his nine terms in Congress, he was a proponent of pro-environmental legislation including the creation of the Fire Island National Seashore on Long Island, which now includes the Otis G. Pike Wilderness Area. In early 1965, at a student meeting at Suffolk County Community College, he said that only revolution would result in a change of government in South Africa. At the same meeting, he also stated that "politicians keep their ear so close to the ground that an ant can jump in" referring to their ability to know what their constituents are thinking. He decided not to seek a 10th term in 1978 and retired from Congress in January 1979.

In September 1971, Pike put forward a bill that would have turned historic Gardiners Island, Cartwright Island, Gardiners Point Island, Hicks Island, and 1000 acres of the nearby shore of Long Island into a national monument.

As a member of congress Pike was generally in favor of military funding. He voted to end the Philadelphia Plan which provided for affirmative action in hiring practices of construction firms on government projects.

==== Pike Committee ====
After the Church Committee had begun its investigation, the Nedzi Committee was created, headed by Democratic Congressman Lucien N. Nedzi, which dissolved only after a few months. Its successor was the Pike Committee, officially called the Select Committee on Intelligence which revealed more secret dealings of the US government. This was around the same time as the United States President's Commission on CIA activities within the United States, commonly called the Rockefeller Commission. The American Prospect gives some background, noting that prior to these investigations, "the U.S. intelligence community had never undergone significant congressional scrutiny" because of a "laissez-faire attitude...but after a 1974 New York Times series by Seymour Hersh revealed that the CIA had conducted "massive" illegal spying activities against American antiwar protesters and dissidents, Congress and the executive branch convulsed into action." Three separate bodies just described were created to further this investigation. The report was suppressed from the start but was leaked by Daniel Schorr to the Village Voice who asked the publication to give to his legal defense fund, which was refused. Schorr showed the "committee report...on television and discussed its contents," resulting in his resignation from CBS and, to his death, refused "to identify his source for the Pike committee report."

The CIA later wrote that "these Congressional investigations eventually delved into all aspects of the CIA and the IC [Intelligence Community] and for the first time in the Agency's history, CIA officials faced hostile Congressional committees bent on the exposure of abuses by intelligence agencies and on major reforms," while criticizing the Pike Committee for never developing a "cooperative working relationship with the Agency [CIA] or the Ford administration." Yet the CIA also wrote that "despite its failures, the Pike Committee inquiry was a new and dramatic break with the past [because] it was the first significant House investigation of the IC since the creation of the CIA in 1947." The London School of Economics and Political Science wrote a similar piece in 2011, saying that the oversight committee chaired by Pike who wanted to publish his committee's report was stonewalled by the Ford administration. This piece also notes that the report describes "details of a covert CIA operation in support of Kurdish rebels in northern Iraq, who were fighting for autonomy against the sinister, pro-Communist, Ba’ath regime in Baghdad" but that in their view there were distortions of "important details" and criticism of Henry Kissinger. In the present, the Mary Farrell Foundation decided to publish the sections of the final report Pike wanted to make public in the first place.

== Later career and death ==
After his retirement from Congress, Pike was a syndicated columnist for Newhouse Newspapers from 1979 to 1999.

He died at a hospice in Florida after an illness in January 2014.

== Family ==
Pike was married twice. In 1946, he married Doris Orth (1923–1996), with whom he had three children: Lois Pike Eyre, a graphic artist; Douglas Pike, a journalist and one-time congressional candidate; and Robert D. Pike (1953–2010), an attorney and entrepreneur. In 2002, Pike married Barbe Bonjour. In retirement, he resided in Vero Beach, Florida, where he continued to practice his favorite hobby, boating.

== Sources ==
- United States Congress. "Otis G. Pike (id: P000348)". Biographical Directory of the United States Congress.
- Otis Pike Biography--Spartacus International
- Appearances on C-SPAN

U.S. House of Representatives
Preceded by Stuyvesant Wainwright	Member of the U.S. House of Representatives from New York's 1st congressional district 1961–1979	Succeeded by William Carney
