= Loudon Wainwright Jr. =

American writer (1924–1988)

- Born: Loudon Snowden Wainwright Jr. December 16, 1924; New York City, US
- Died: December 12, 1988 (aged 63); New York City, US
- Education: St. Andrew's School; University of North Carolina at Chapel Hill
- Occupations: Writer, editor
- Spouse: Martha Harriet Taylor (after 1945)
- Children: 5, including Loudon, Sloan
- Relatives: A. Loudon Snowden (great-grandfather); Rufus Wainwright (grandson); Martha Wainwright (granddaughter); Lucy Wainwright Roche (granddaughter)
- Writing career
- Language: English

Loudon Snowden Wainwright Jr. (December 16, 1924 – December 12, 1988) was an American writer. He was the father of folk singer Loudon Wainwright III and singer Sloan Wainwright, and grandfather to Rufus Wainwright, Martha Wainwright, and Lucy Wainwright Roche.

== Early life ==
Wainwright was born on December 16, 1924, in Manhattan. He was the son of Eleanor Painter (née Sloan) (1903–1985) and Loudon Snowden Wainwright (1898–1942). His father, a graduate of the Pawling School and Princeton University, was a senior partner in the insurance firm of Wainwright & Page, Inc.

Wainwright's paternal grandparents were Stuyvesant Wainwright, a direct descendant of Director-General of New Netherland Peter Stuyvesant, and Caroline Smith (née Snowden) Wainwright. His great-grandfather was politician and diplomat Archibald Loudon Snowden, who served as United States Ambassador to Serbia, Romania, Greece, and Spain. His uncle, the artist Carroll Livingston Wainwright, was married to Edith Gould, the daughter of George Jay Gould, and was the father of U.S. Representative Stuyvesant Wainwright II, Loudon's first cousin.

Wainwright graduated from St. Andrew's School in Middletown, Delaware in 1942, and attended and graduated from the University of North Carolina at Chapel Hill, where he was elected to Phi Beta Kappa and joined St. Anthony Hall. After college, he served in the U.S. Marine Corps.

== Career ==
Wainwright joined the staff of Life magazine and worked in a variety of positions over the years, including staff writer, reporter, correspondent, bureau chief. He was assigned to cover the Project Mercury astronauts. He and John Glenn listened to the inauguration speech of John F. Kennedy while riding in Glenn's car in 1961. In 1964 he began writing "The View From Here", a regular column in the magazine which appeared until the magazine ceased weekly publication in 1972. From 1969 on he also served as assistant managing editor.

When Life resumed publication as a monthly in 1978, he joined its staff as an editor, and continued to contribute to its pages after retiring from that position in 1985. After his death, the magazine published a retrospective in the February 1989 issue with excerpts from some of the two hundred columns he had written for it over the years.

In 1986, Wainwright was also the author of The Great American Magazine: An Inside History of Life, an informal history of the magazine.

== Personal life ==
On September 13, 1945, Wainwright was married to Martha Harriet Taylor (1922–1997), the daughter of Walter Taylor of Atlanta, Georgia. At the time of their wedding, Martha was a Private first class with the United States Marine Corps Women's Reserve. Together, they were the parents of:

- Loudon Wainwright III (born 1946), who married folk singer Kate McGarrigle (1946–2010) in 1971, with whom he had two children. After their separation and divorce, he fathered a third child with singer Suzzy Roche (born 1956).
- Martha Taylor Wainwright
- Andrew Wainwright
- Eleanor Sloan Wainwright (born 1957), a singer who married George McTavey.

Although they never divorced, Wainwright was separated from his wife for the last 10 years of his life. He had a long time relationship with Martha Fay, with whom he had one daughter:

- Anna Fay Wainwright (b. 1982).

After two years of illness, Wainwright died on December 12, 1988, aged 63, in Manhattan, from colon cancer. He was buried at Cedar Lawn Cemetery in East Hampton, New York.

=== Descendants ===
Through his son Loudon, Wainwright was the grandfather of singer-songwriters Rufus Wainwright (born 1973), who married Jörn Weisbrodt and had a child, Viva Wainwright Cohen, with friend Lorca Cohen (herself the daughter of singer Leonard Cohen); Martha Wainwright (born 1976), who married Brad Albetta; and Lucy Wainwright Roche (b. 1981).

Through his daughter Sloan, Wainwright was the grandfather of two, Sam and Gabe McTavey.

== See also ==
- Stuyvesant family
