= Apple Orchard Point Island =

Island in Tasmania, Australia

- Location within Tasmania

Geography
- Location: Bass Strait
- Coordinates: 40°18′S 148°12′E
- Archipelago: Furneaux Group
- Area: 0.85 ha (2.1 acres)

Administration
- Australia
- State: Tasmania

Apple Orchard Point Island is a small island, with an area of 0.85 ha, in south-eastern Australia. It is part of Tasmania’s Vansittart Island Group, lying in eastern Bass Strait between Flinders and Cape Barren Islands in the Furneaux Group.

== Fauna ==
Recorded breeding seabird and wader species are little penguin and sooty oystercatcher. Reptiles present include white-lipped snake and metallic skink.
