= Gardiners Point Island =

Island in Suffolk County, New York, United States

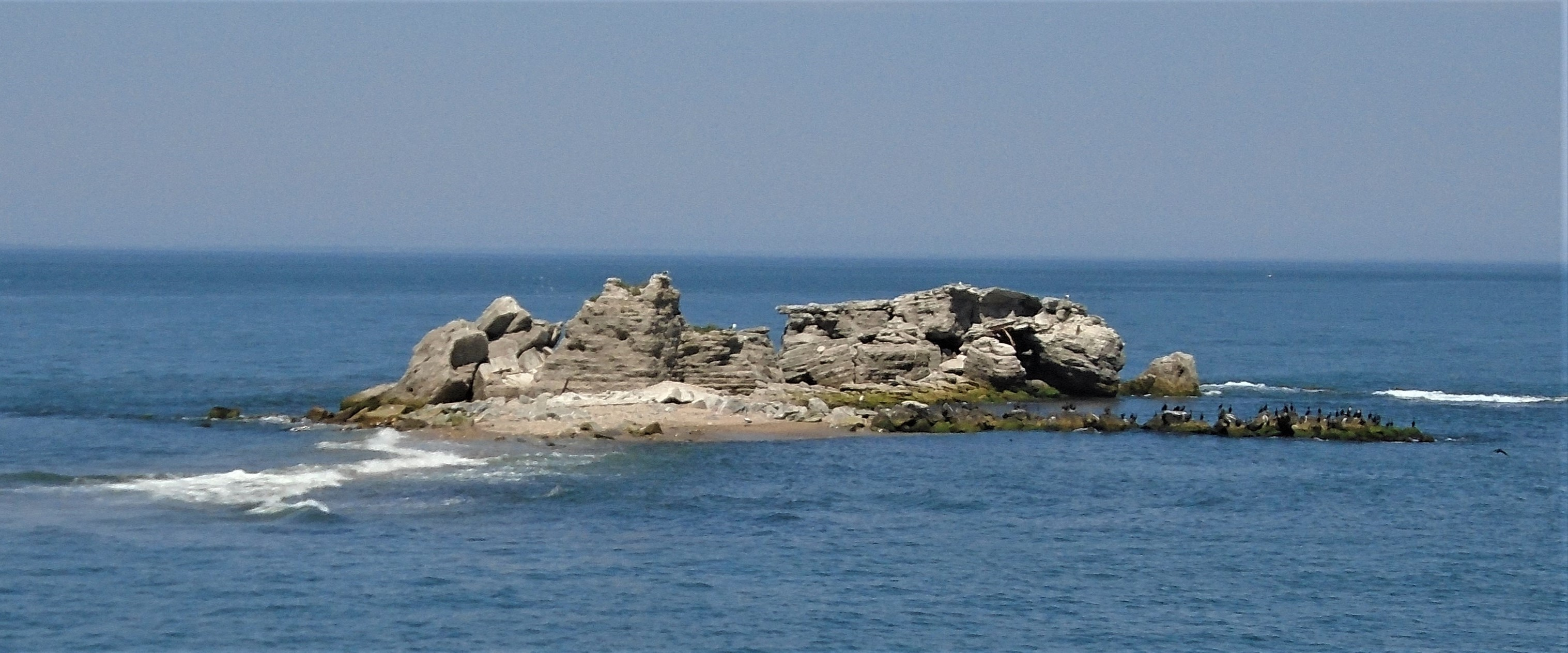
- "The Ruins" in 2022
- Interactive map of Gardiners Point Island

Geography
- Location: Block Island Sound
- Coordinates: 41°08′29″N 72°08′46″W

Administration
- United States

Gardiners Point Island is an island in Block Island Sound, New York, that was the former location of the Gardiners Island Lighthouse as well as Fort Tyler. Once a peninsula of Gardiners Island – permanently detached in 1888 by a storm – it had an area at least as large as 14 acres. Today it is part of the Long Island National Wildlife Refuge Complex, reduced, however, to a relative speck consisting of the foundations of the fort. It is locally referred to as "The Ruins".

The island is under the jurisdiction of East Hampton, New York.

== History ==
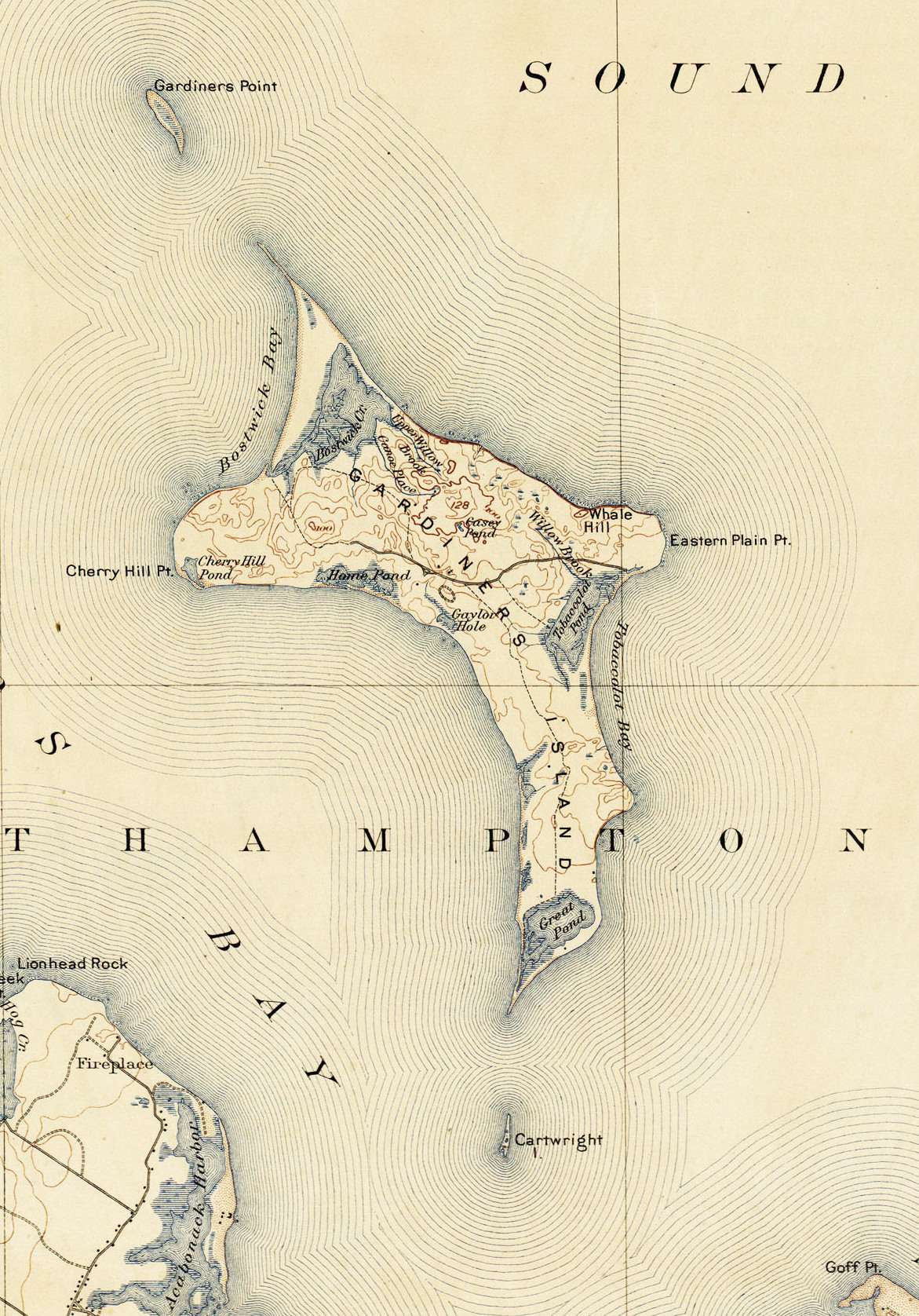
Gardiners Point Island is the small island north of Gardiners Island on this map from 1904.

Funds for a lighthouse on Gardiners Point Island, which was at the time a peninsula of Gardiners Island, connected by a long neck of land, were appropriated by Congress in 1851 and 1852. In 1851 the federal government purchased 14 acres (5.7 hectares) on the peninsula from the Gardiners for $400. It was cleared of jurisdictional encumberances in 1853, and construction began the next year. Construction was completed by December of that year at the cost of $7,000, and the lamp was lit in 1855. The station consisted of a one-and-a-half story keeper's house, and a circular tower 9 feet (2.7 m) in diameter whose lantern was 30 feet (9.1 m) above the low water level.

A March 1888 Nor'easter, referred to as the Great Blizzard of 1888, caused a break in the peninsula, permanently turning the point into an island. Between 1890 and 1893 the island shrank at the rate of 10 2/3 feet per year. Forty years after it was completed, just after a new boathouse and boatways were built, the lighthouse was abandoned because of the continuing encroachment of the sea. It was replaced at the end of May by a moored gas-lighted buoy about a quarter of a mile (.4 km) north-by-east from the lighthouse. In April 1898, the site of the lighthouse was transferred to the War Department.

During the Spanish–American War the War Department recommended and Congress appropriated $500,000 to build Fort Tyler on the island as part of the Harbor Defenses of Long Island Sound. A temporary battery was constructed as an interim measure at a cost of $77,100. This battery consisted of emplacements for two 8-inch M1888 guns on converted carriages for 1870s-era Rodman guns. It was one of a number of batteries built shortly after the outbreak of the war, as it was feared the Spanish fleet would bombard the US east coast. The "Report of the Commission on the Conduct of the War with Spain" states the platforms were ready, but does not state that the guns were mounted.

There are two stories as to who the permanent fort was named for. One source states it was named for Daniel Tyler, a general and Civil War veteran who died in 1882, in General Order 194 of 27 December 1904. Another story is that it was named for former President John Tyler (1841-1845) who married Julia Gardiner Tyler, born on Gardiners Island. The permanent fort consisted of Battery Edmund Smith, with emplacements for two 8-inch M1888 disappearing guns and two 5-inch M1900 guns on pedestal mounts. Records indicate that it was never armed. The fort was unusual in that it seems to have arisen entirely out of wartime fears. Most forts of its era were started based on recommendations of the 1885 Board of Fortifications and were already under construction (though years from completion) when war broke out. Thus, in most cases the temporary batteries were to quickly provide some armament for pre-existing forts.

The shifting sands caused continuing problems for the fort, and it was abandoned in 1924 and transferred to the state as part of a post-World War I drawdown of coast defenses. In 1938 the island was declared a National Bird Refuge by Franklin Roosevelt and transferred to the Agriculture Department.

During World War II the fort was used for bombing practice and this, combined with erosion, reduced it to its present state where it is popularly called "The Ruins."

In September 1971 Otis G. Pike put forward a bill that the US Federal government expropriate Gardiners Point Island, historic Gardiners Island, Cartwright Island, Hicks Island and 1000 acres of the nearby shore of Long Island, and turn them into a national monument.

The state of New York briefly considered turning it into a park but it is deemed a navigational hazard because of the possibilities of unexploded ordnance. It is now part of the Long Island National Wildlife Refuge Complex.

== See also ==
- Seacoast defense in the United States
- United States Army Coast Artillery Corps
- Board of Fortifications
- Harbor Defense Command
