= Margaret Center Klingelsmith =

American suffragist, lawyer, translator and law librarian (1852–1931)

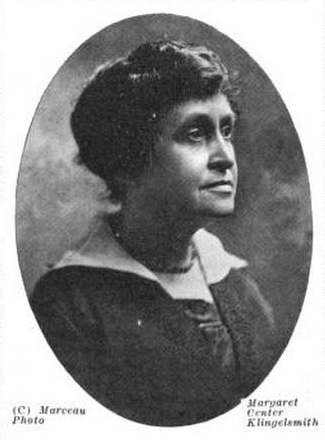
- Margaret Center Klingelsmith, from a 1921 publication
- Born: Margaret Center; November 27, 1852; Portland, Maine, U.S.
- Died: January 19, 1931 (aged 78); Philadelphia, Pennsylvania, U.S.
- Resting place: Portland, Maine, U.S.
- Education: University of Pennsylvania
- Occupations: Suffragist; lawyer; translator; law librarian
- Spouse: Joseph M. Klingelsmith (m. 1884)
- Parent(s): Isaac Henry Center; Carolina Howe Evans Center

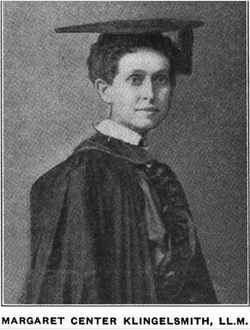
Margaret Center Klingelsmith, on the occasion of her honorary LL.M., 1916.

Margaret Center Klingelsmith (November 27, 1852 – January 19, 1931) was an American suffragist, lawyer, translator, and law librarian.

== Early life ==
Margaret Center was born in Portland, Maine, the daughter of Isaac Henry Center and Carolina Howe Evans Center. Both of her parents were from old New England families. She earned a law degree at the University of Pennsylvania in 1898, as a member of Penn's first class to include women students.

== Career ==
Klingelsmith was one of the first women admitted to the bar and licensed to practice law in Philadelphia. She was the third law librarian at the University of Pennsylvania's Biddle Law Library, after it was founded in 1886. She published a history of the library and much expanded the library's holdings and services during her three decades of leadership. She also published a translation of an old Norman French law text, known as Statham's Abridgement. When she died, the Biddle Law Library notice said that she was "a writer of charm and a learned scholar of early common law history."

Klingelsmith was the only woman to be a charter member of the American Association of Law Libraries (AALL) when it was founded in 1906. She served as vice president of the organization from 1912 to 1914.

Klingelsmith wrote on legal issues for the Pennsylvania Woman Suffrage Association. She was also a director of the Business and Professional Woman's Club of Philadelphia, vice-president of the Women Lawyers' Association for Pennsylvania, and president of the Women's Democratic Club of Philadelphia. In 1916, she was awarded an honorary LL.M. degree from the University of Pennsylvania, for her scholarship and service to the school. A law journal in her day described her as "a noted suffragist and active in suffrage propaganda". Pointing to portraits of the Founding Fathers, Klingelsmith quipped that "If ruffles and frills and silks and velvets mean weakmindedness surely our republic should have fallen before this."

== Personal life ==
Margaret Center married Joseph M. Klingelsmith in 1884. She died in 1931, aged 78 years, at her home in Philadelphia. Her gravesite is in Portland, Maine, and there is a placard placed in her memory at the Biddle Law Library.

In 1976, a few weeks before the American Bicentennial, ten women bought a full-page ad in a Maine newspaper and included Klingelsmith in a list of prominent Maine women under the heading "Our Foremothers We Salute You!" She was inducted into the AALL Hall of Fame in 2010.
