= Stuyvesant Wainwright =

American politician (1921–2010)

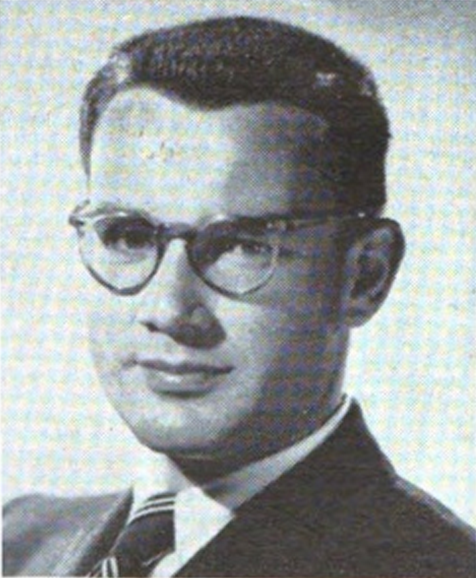

Member of the U.S. House of Representatives from New York's 1st district
- In office January 3, 1953 – January 3, 1961
- Preceded by: Ernest Greenwood
- Succeeded by: Otis G. Pike

Personal details
- Born: March 16, 1921 New York City, New York, U.S.
- Died: March 6, 2010 (aged 88) Wainscott, New York, U.S.
- Party: Republican
- Spouse: Janet Isabel Parsons (m. 1941)
- Children: 4
- Parent(s): Carroll Livingston Wainwright; Edith Catherine Gould
- Relatives: Loudon Wainwright Jr. (cousin); George Jay Gould (grandfather)
- Education: Westminster School
- Alma mater: Yale Law School

Military service
- Allegiance: United States
- Branch/service: United States Army
- Years of service: 1942–1945
- Rank: Lieutenant Colonel
- Battles/wars: World War II

Stuyvesant Wainwright II (March 16, 1921 – March 6, 2010) was a Republican member of the United States House of Representatives from New York.

== Early life ==
Wainwright was born in New York City, the son of Carroll Livingston Wainwright (1899–1967) and Edith Catherine Gould (1901–1937), daughter of financier George Jay Gould (1864–1923) and Edith M. Kingdon (1864–1921). His siblings were Carroll L. Wainwright Jr. (1925–2016) and Caroline Wainwright (1924–1969), and his paternal grandparents were Stuyvesant Wainwright (1863–1930) and Caroline Smith Snowden (1865–1960). His grandmother later married Carl F. Wolff. He was a great-nephew of General Jonathan Mayhew Wainwright (1883–1953), a four star-general who was the hero of Bataan and commander of the U.S. forces in the Philippines during World War II. His uncle, Loudon Wainwright, was the father of Loudon Wainwright Jr. (his cousin), and the grandfather of Loudon Wainwright III, the singer and songwriter, himself the father of Rufus Wainwright, Martha Wainwright, and Lucy Wainwright Roche.

In 1927, his family moved to East Hampton, New York, where they built an imposing house called "Gulf Crest," that was valued at $350,000 in 1937. His parents divorced in 1932, and his mother married Sir Hector MacNeal, the Scottish shipowner. He attended Lawrenceville School in 1936–37, playing on the tennis team and residing in Dickinson House. He then attended the Westminster School, Simsbury, Connecticut, and graduated from Yale Law School in 1947.

== Career ==
On January 30, 1942, at the age of 20, he left Yale and enlisted as a private in the United States Army. He attended officers' candidate school and, on December 30, 1943, went overseas during World War II. He rose through the ranks and became a commanding officer of the Office of Strategic Services, a wartime intelligence agency and predecessor of the modern Central Intelligence Agency. He returned to the U.S. on June 10, 1945, and spent the last three months of his service as an adviser on intelligence coordination in the War Department in Washington, D.C. He was honorably discharged from the Army as a Captain on December 13, 1945. After the War, he served in the Active Army Reserve and retired as a Lieutenant Colonel in 1960.

He resumed his legal studies at Yale, was graduated in 1947, was admitted to the New York State Bar in 1948, and began practicing in New York City, where he was a partner in the firm of Walker, Beale, Wainwright & Wolf.

=== United States Congress ===
In 1952, he was elected to Congress in the Republican wave that flipped the House, Senate, and Presidency from Democrat to Republican. Wainwright went on to serve four consecutive terms as the Representative for New York's 1st congressional district from January 3, 1953, until January 3, 1961, in the 83rd, 84th, and 85th United States Congresses.

While serving in Congress, he was a member of the House Armed Services Committee, Foreign Affairs Committee, the Education and Labor Committee and the Merchant Marine Committee. Wainwright voted in favor of the Civil Rights Acts of 1957 and 1960.

He narrowly lost a re-election bid in 1960 against Democrat Otis G. Pike.

=== Later career ===
After leaving the House of Representatives, he taught political science at Rutgers University from 1960 to 1961. Afterwards, he resumed the practice of law with the firm Battle, Fowler, Lidstone, Jaffin, Pierce & Kheel. From 1975 until 1979, he was president of the Miltope Corporation and a director of the corporation from 1975 to 1985.

== Personal life ==
In 1941, Wainwright was married to Janet Isabel Parsons (1920–2000), the daughter of Thomas Crouse Parsons. Before their divorce, they were the parents of:

- Stuyvesant Wainwright III
- Jonathan Mayhew Wainwright (b. 1944)
- Janet Snowden Wainwright, who married Charles Brandon Waring in 1967.
- Laura Wainwright

Until his death he was a resident of Wainscott, New York and lived on Georgica Pond, a census-designated place that roughly corresponds to the hamlet with the same name in the town of East Hampton in Suffolk County, New York, on the South Fork of Long Island.

He served on the Boards of the Southampton Hospital, Guild Hall of East Hampton, the vestry of St. Luke's Church in East Hampton, the Maidstone Club of East Hampton, and the Union Club of the City of New York. He was also a member of the New York Young Republican Club, the Cruising Club of America, and the Royal Bermuda Yacht Club.

U.S. House of Representatives
Preceded by Ernest Greenwood	Member of the U.S. House of Representatives from New York's 1st congressional district 1953–1961	Succeeded by Otis G. Pike
