= Point Islands =

Island group in Nunavut, Canada

- Location within Nunavut Location within Canada

Geography
- Location: Hudson Strait's Diana Bay
- Coordinates: 60°52′N 070°03′W

Administration
- Canada
- Nunavut: Nunavut
- Region: Qikiqtaaluk

Demographics
- Population: Uninhabited
- Source: Point Islands at Atlas of Canada

The uninhabited Point Islands are located in Hudson Strait's Diana Bay. Though they are near the Inuit hamlet of Quaqtaq, Quebec, they are part of the Qikiqtaaluk Region, in the Nunavut of Nunavut.
